= Thumb Mountain =

Mountain in New Hampshire, United States

Highest point
- Elevation: 1,978 ft (603 m)
- Coordinates: 42°58′20″N 72°03′02″W

Geography
- Location: Hancock, New Hampshire

Geology
- Rock age: 400 million years
- Mountain type(s): monadnock; metamorphic rock

Climbing
- Easiest route: Harriskat and Thumbs trails

Thumb Mountain is a 1,978-foot (603 m) steep-sided monadnock located in Hancock, New Hampshire approximately 13 mi (21 km) east of the city of Keene and 8 mi (13 km) north of Mount Monadnock. The mountain shares a common base with Skatutakee Mountain, 1,998 feet (609 m), 3,000 feet (910 m) to the east. Much of the mountain is wooded but open ledges near the summit provide views of the surrounding countryside; vistas include the north face of Mount Monadnock.

The west side of the mountain drains into Nubanusit Lake, Harrisville Pond, Skatutakee Lake, thence into Nubanusit Brook, the Contoocook River, the Merrimack River, and the Atlantic Ocean. The east side drains into Jaquith Brook, thence into Nubanusit Brook. The north side drains into Ferguson Brook, thence the Contoocook River.

The mountain is part of a 12,500 acres (51 km^{2}) "supersanctuary" composed of a number of conservation properties and easements facilitated by the Harris Center for Outdoor Education, other non-profit entities, and the state of New Hampshire. The Harris Center maintains several hiking trails on the mountain and an environmental educational center at the mountain's north foot.
