= Skatutakee Mountain =

Mountain in New Hampshire, United States

Highest point
- Elevation: 1,998 ft (609 m)
- Coordinates: 42°58′07″N 72°02′10″W

Geography
- Location: Hancock, New Hampshire

Geology
- Rock age: 400 million years
- Mountain type(s): monadnock; metamorphic rock

Climbing
- Easiest route: Bee Line Trail

Skatutakee Mountain is a 1,998-foot (609 m) monadnock located in Hancock, New Hampshire approximately 13 mi (21 km) east of the city of Keene and 8 mi (13 km) north of Mount Monadnock. The mountain shares a common base with Thumb Mountain, 1,978 feet (603 m), 3,000 feet (910 m) to the west. Much of the mountain is wooded but open ledges near the summit provide views of the surrounding countryside; vistas include the north face of Mount Monadnock.

The south side of the mountain drains into Jaquith Brook, thence into Nubanusit Brook, the Contoocook River, the Merrimack River, and the Atlantic Ocean. The north side drains into Ferguson Brook, thence the Contoocook River.

The mountain is part of a 12,500 acres (51 km^{2}) "supersanctuary" composed of a number of conservation properties and easements facilitated by the Harris Center for Conservation Education, other non-profit entities, and the state of New Hampshire. The Harris Center maintains several hiking trails on the mountain and an environmental educational center at the mountain's north foot.
