= Bemis House =

Bemis House may refer to the following American houses:

- Elbridge G. Bemis House, Harrisville, New Hampshire, on the National Register of Historic Places (NRHP)
- George Bemis House, Harrisville, New Hampshire, on the NRHP
- Judson Moss Bemis House, Colorado Springs, Colorado, on the NRHP
- Polly Bemis House, Idaho County, Idaho, on the NRHP

== See also ==
- Fuller–Bemis House, Waltham, Massachusetts, on the NRHP
