= Jaffrey (CDP), New Hampshire =

Census-designated place in New Hampshire, United States

Jaffrey, New Hampshire
- Census-designated place
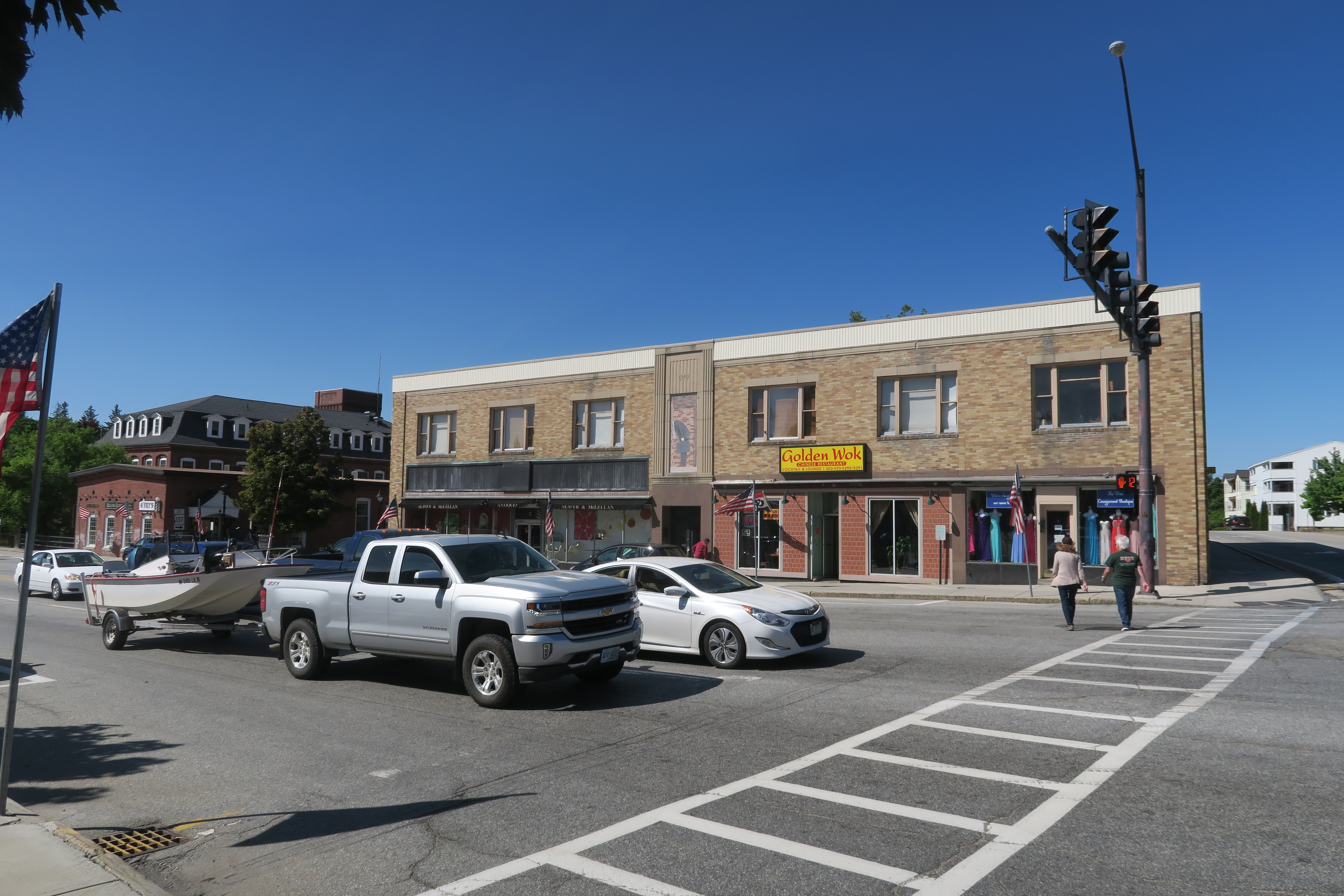
- Golden Wok, Jaffrey, New Hampshire

- Location within New Hampshire Location within the United States
- Coordinates: 42°48′44″N 72°01′25″W
- Country: United States
- State: New Hampshire
- County: Cheshire
- Town: Jaffrey

Area
  - Total: 3.53 sq mi (9.13 km^{2})
  - Land: 3.41 sq mi (8.82 km^{2})
  - Water: 0.12 sq mi (0.31 km^{2})
- Elevation: 1,004 ft (306 m)

Population (2020)
  - Total: 3,058
  - Density: 898.4/sq mi (346.86/km^{2})
- Time zone: UTC-5 (Eastern (EST))
  - Summer (DST): UTC-4 (EDT)
- ZIP code: 03452
- Area code: 603
- FIPS code: 33-38420
- GNIS feature ID: 2378075

Jaffrey is a census-designated place (CDP) and the main village in the town of Jaffrey, New Hampshire, United States. The population of the CDP was 3,058 at the 2020 census, out of 5,320 in the entire town of Jaffrey.

== Geography ==
The CDP is in the eastern part of the town of Jaffrey, on both sides of the north-flowing Contoocook River. U.S. Route 202 passes through the center of the village, leading northeast (downriver) 6 miles (10 km) to Peterborough and south 11 miles (18 km) to Winchendon, Massachusetts. New Hampshire Route 124 crosses US 202 in the center of Jaffrey, leading east 10 miles (16 km) to New Ipswich and northwest 12 miles (19 km) to Marlborough. New Hampshire Route 137 leads north from Jaffrey 14 miles (23 km) to Hancock.

The Jaffrey CDP is bordered to the north by Harkness Road, Proctor Road, Amos Fortune Road, and Nutting Road; to the east by Cheshire Pond, Hillcrest Road, Fitzgerald Drive, Plantation Drive, Squantum Road, Rue Deschenes, and the east end of Contoocook Lake; to the south by the Rindge town line; and to the west by US 202, Mountain Brook Reservoir, Gilmore Pond Road, Highland Avenue, NH 124, and Matchpoint Road.

According to the U.S. Census Bureau, the Jaffrey CDP has a total area of 3.5 square miles (9.1 km^{2}), of which 3.4 square miles (8.8 km^{2}) are land and 0.1 square miles (0.3 km^{2}), or 3.39%, are water.

== Demographics ==
Historical population
Census	Pop.	Note	%±
1960	1,648		—
1970	1,922		16.6%
1980	2,684		39.6%
1990	2,558		−4.7%
2000	2,802		9.5%
2010	2,757		−1.6%
2020	3,058		10.9%
U.S. Decennial Census

As of the census of 2010, there were 2,757 people, 1,224 households, and 704 families residing in the Jaffrey CDP. There were 1,329 housing units, of which 105, or 7.9%, were vacant. The racial makeup of the town was 95.9% White, 0.7% African American, 0.2% Native American, 0.9% Asian, 0.04% Pacific Islander, 0.3% some other race, and 2.0% from two or more races. 2.0% of the population were Hispanic or Latino of any race.

Of the 1,224 households in the CDP, 29.3% had children under the age of 18 living with them, 35.9% were headed by married couples living together, 13.6% had a female householder with no husband present, and 42.5% were non-families. 34.9% of all households were made up of individuals, and 11.7% were someone living alone who was 65 years of age or older. The average household size was 2.25, and the average family size was 2.90.

23.8% of people in the CDP were under the age of 18, 9.6% were from 18 to 24, 25.2% were from 25 to 44, 28.2% were from 45 to 64, and 13.1% were 65 years of age or older. The median age was 39.3 years. For every 100 females, there were 90.9 males. For every 100 females age 18 and over, there were 88.5 males.

For the period 2011–15, the estimated median annual income for a household was $35,360, and the median income for a family was $70,196. The per capita income for the town was $23,465. 21.0% of the population and 8.7% of families were below the poverty line, along with 32.2% of people under the age of 18 and 27.2% of people 65 or older.
