= Point Comfort (Harrisville, New Hampshire) =

Historic house in New Hampshire, United States

- U.S. National Register of Historic Places
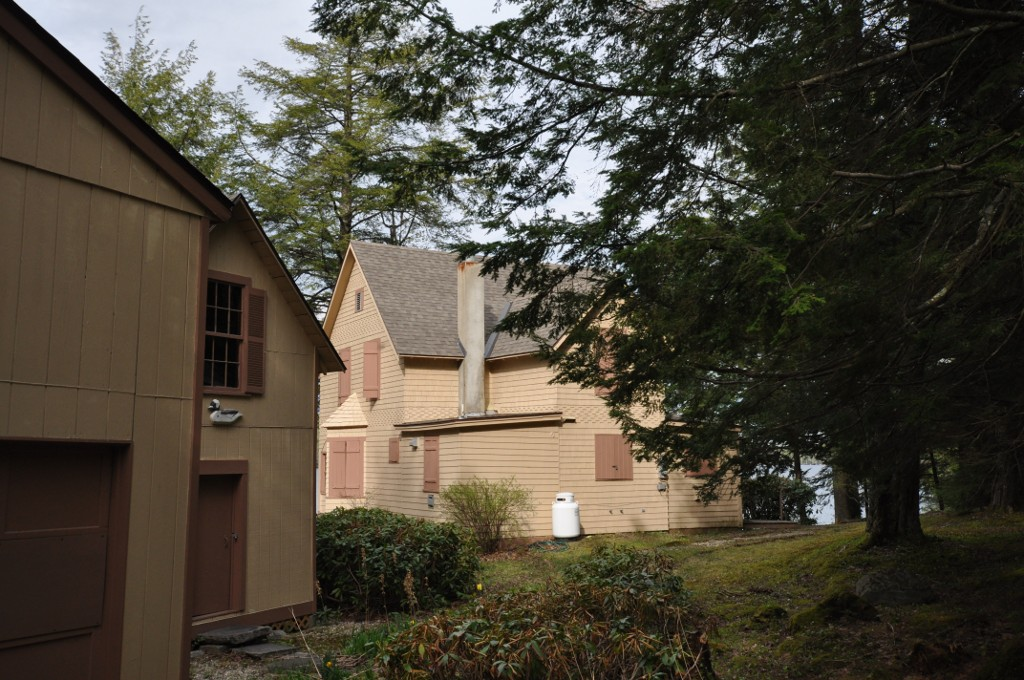

- Location within New Hampshire Location within the United States
- Location: S. Skatutakee Rd., Harrisville, New Hampshire
- Coordinates: 42°56′9″N 72°5′5″W
- Area: 1.8 acres (0.73 ha)
- Built: 1892
- MPS: Harrisville MRA
- NRHP reference No.: 86003256
- Added to NRHP: January 14, 1988

Point Comfort is a historic house on South Skatutakee Road in Harrisville, New Hampshire. Built in 1892, this 2 1/2-story wood-frame house is one of the earliest summer resort houses to be built along the shores of Skatutakee Lake, and an architecturally eclectic mix of the Queen Anne and Arts and Crafts styles. The house was listed on the National Register of Historic Places in 1988.

== Description and history ==
Point Comfort is located southeast of the village center of Harrisville, occupying 1.8 acres (0.73 ha) between the south shore of Skatutakee Lake and South Skatutakee Road, about 0.4 miles (0.64 km) east of Main Street. It is a 2 1/2-story T-shaped wood-frame structure, with gabled roofs and shingled exterior. It is eclectically styled, with steeply pitched gables, bands of shingles on the walls, exposed rafter ends, and decorative rake boards. Its interior includes an Arts and Crafts fireplace mantel, and birch paneled walls. Its lake-facing porch has been enclosed. The property includes two outbuildings, a period shed and a later garage.

Although some portions of Harrisville were developed in the late 19th and early 20th centuries as summer resort areas by vacationers from as far off as Boston, Massachusetts and New York City, Skatutakee Lake was principally developed as a summer retreat by regionally local business people from Keene and Marlborough. This house was built in 1892 (based on a date on the back of the fireplace mantel), most likely by a Keene resident. It is one of the oldest surviving buildings on the lake.

== See also ==
- National Register of Historic Places listings in Cheshire County, New Hampshire
