= Harrisville Pond =

American water body

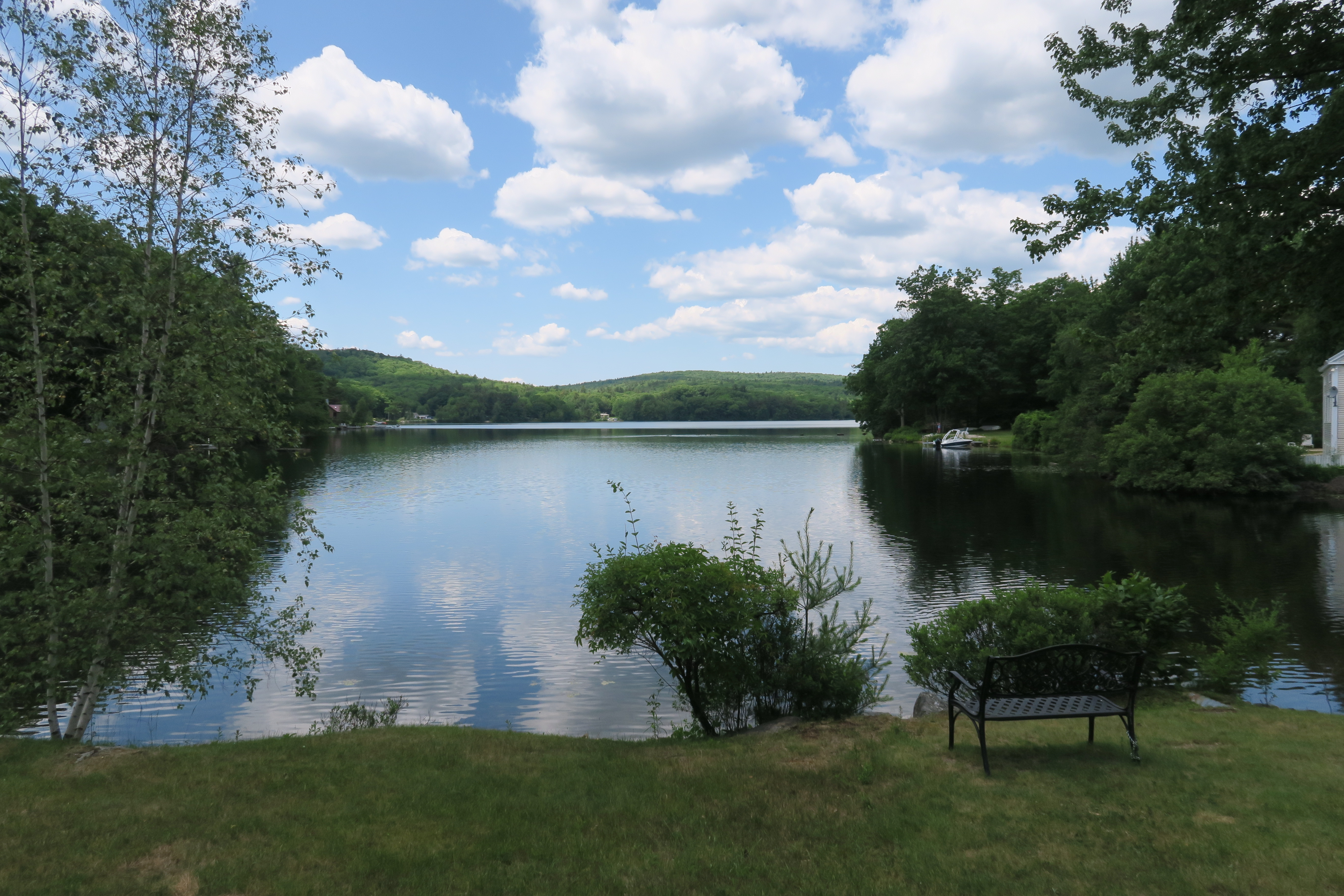

- Location within New Hampshire Location within the United States
- Location: Cheshire County, New Hampshire
- Coordinates: 42°56′44″N 72°05′46″W
- Primary inflows: Nubanusit Brook
- Primary outflows: Nubanusit Brook
- Basin countries: United States
- Max. length: 0.78 mi (1.26 km)
- Max. width: 0.25 mi (0.40 km)
- Surface area: 138 acres (0.56 km^{2})
- Average depth: 15 feet (4.6 m)
- Max. depth: 40 feet (12 m)
- Water volume: 2,070 acre-feet (2,550,000 m^{3})
- Surface elevation: 1,319 feet (402 m)
- Settlements: Harrisville

Harrisville Pond is a 138-acre (0.56 km^{2}) water body located in Cheshire County in southwestern New Hampshire, United States, in the town of Harrisville. It is one of many lakes and ponds along Nubanusit Brook, a tributary of the Contoocook River. Water from Nubanusit Lake flows via the Great Meadows into the pond on the north side and out of the pond at two dams on the south side. One dam allows the level of the pond to be raised or lowered and also adjusts the flow through the mills that span that part of the outlet, while the other dam is made of large stones and sandbags. The village of Harrisville is located at the outlet of the pond.

The pond is warm water and contains largemouth and smallmouth bass, Eastern chain pickerel, brown bullhead, black crappie and bluegill.

== See also ==
- List of lakes in New Hampshire
