= Elbridge G. Bemis House =

Historic house in New Hampshire, United States

- U.S. National Register of Historic Places
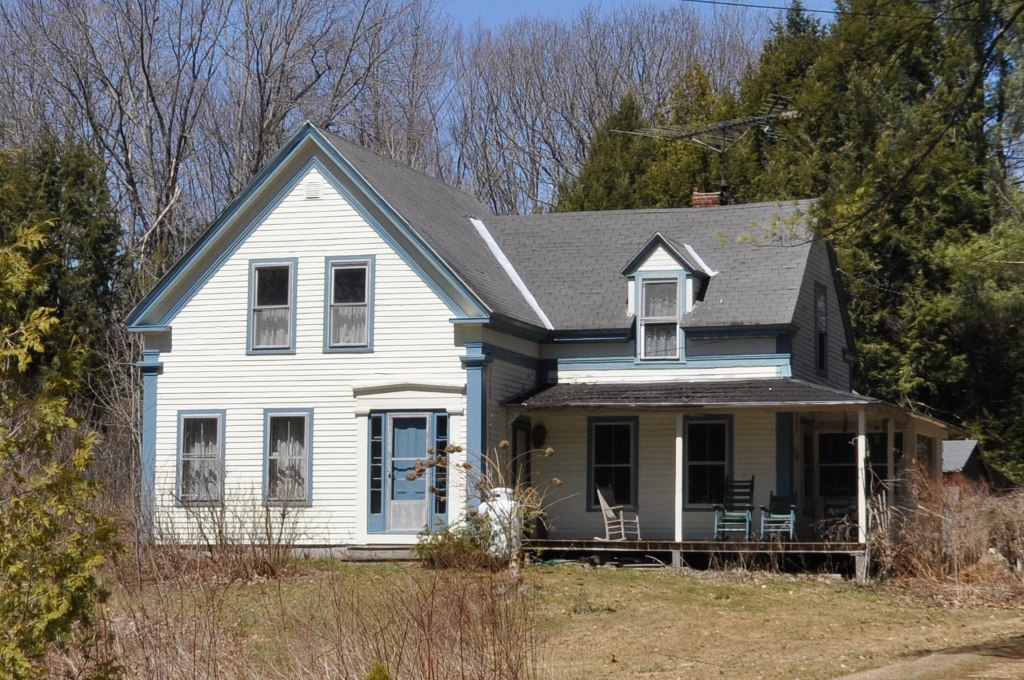

- Location within New Hampshire Location within the United States
- Location: Chesham Rd., Harrisville, New Hampshire
- Coordinates: 42°56′14″N 72°8′33″W
- Area: 0.5 acres (0.20 ha)
- Built: 1855
- Architectural style: Greek Revival
- MPS: Harrisville MRA
- NRHP reference No.: 86003247
- Added to NRHP: January 14, 1988

The Elbridge G. Bemis House is a historic house on Chesham Road in Harrisville, New Hampshire. The two-story Greek Revival frame house is one of a pair of houses built for the Bemis brothers (the other is the nearby George Bemis House), and is one of a few well-preserved houses of that period in the town. The house was listed on the National Register of Historic Places in 1988.

== Description and history ==
The Elbridge G. Bemis House is located in a rural residential setting east of the village center of Chesham, on the north side of Chesham Road west of Chesham Pond. It is a 1½-story frame structure, with a gabled roof and clapboarded exterior. A substantial single-story gabled ell extends to its right, with an open shed-roof porch extending across its front and around its side. The main block is three bays wide, with the main entrance in the right bay and two windows in the attic level. The building corners are pilastered, and the entry is framed by sidelight windows and a heavy entablature with a slightly peaked gable. The ell has a single gabled dormer on its front roof face.

The house was built about 1855 for Elbridge Bemis, a member of the locally prominent Bemis family, who operated a sawmill nearby with his brother George. Its form is one typical of houses built in Harrisville at the time, of which only a few representative examples now survive.

== See also ==
- National Register of Historic Places listings in Cheshire County, New Hampshire
