= Harrisville Rural District =

Historic district in New Hampshire, United States

- U.S. National Register of Historic Places
- U.S. Historic district
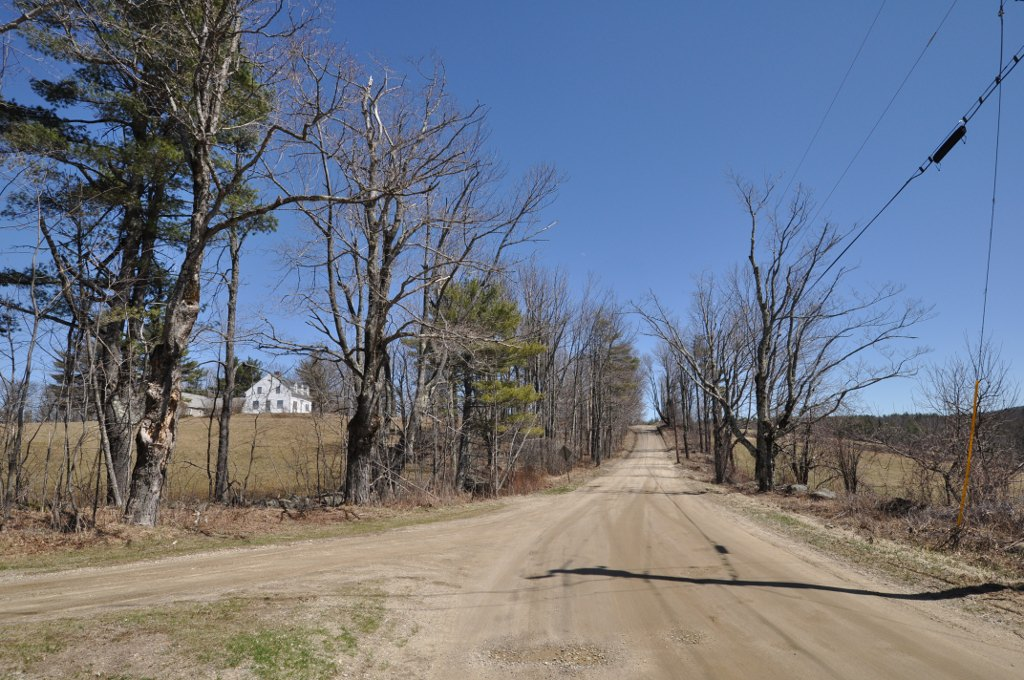
- Mason Rd.

- Location within New Hampshire Location within the United States
- Location: Roughly along Venable, Old Harrisville, New Harrisville, and Bonds Corner Rds., Harrisville, New Hampshire
- Coordinates: 42°55′36″N 72°4′42″W
- Area: 1,510 acres (610 ha)
- MPS: Harrisville MRA
- NRHP reference No.: 86003078
- Added to NRHP: February 18, 1987

The Harrisville Rural District in Harrisville, New Hampshire was listed on the National Register of Historic Places in 1987. The district encompasses a large area in the central southern part of the town, where much of its early development took place. Its westernmost public point is the corner of Mason and Macveagh Roads, and it extends eastward from there, encompassing properties that abut Mason, Venable, and New Harrisville Roads south to the town line with Dublin. Further east it encompasses properties on Bonds Corner Road between Eastview and Lampman Roads, as well as some property on the north side of Lampman Road. The district includes existing houses and outbuildings as well as foundational and archaeological remnants of previous early settlement structures. A portion of the district along New Harrisville and Venable Roads is overlaid by the Beech Hill Summer Home District.

Harrisville was laid out as part of Dublin in 1750, with an initial survey laying out 220 lots. All or part of sixteen of the first lots to be settled are included in the district, and represent the largest concentration of arable land in the town. Early property divisions are still largely marked by roads (either actively used or abandoned), stone walls, and mature tree plantings. This area began as a subsistence farming area, but developed in the 19th century as a supply center for the growing mill village in the center of Harrisville. The farms in this district supplied perishable farm products for the village residents and mill workers, sheep wool for the mills to process, and lumber for construction and the manufacture of wood products. These uses declined in the early 20th century, with the economic decline partially offset by the rise of summer country estates in the area.

== See also ==
- Harrisville Historic District, a later mill village and a National Historic Landmark
- National Register of Historic Places listings in Cheshire County, New Hampshire
