= Point Comfort (disambiguation) =

Point Comfort can refer to the following places in the United States:

- Point Comfort, Texas
- Point Comfort, Wisconsin
- Point Comfort (Harrisville, New Hampshire), a historic house
- New Point Comfort, Virginia
- Old Point Comfort, Virginia
