= Beech Hill Summer Home District =

Historic district in New Hampshire, United States

- U.S. National Register of Historic Places
- U.S. Historic district
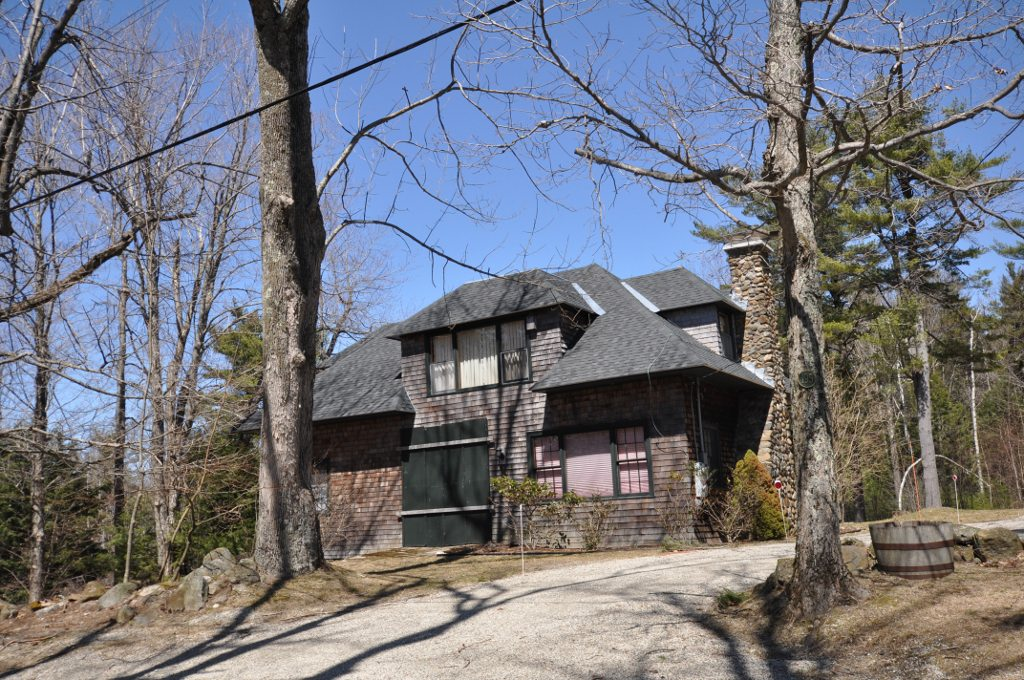

- Location within New Hampshire Location within the United States
- Location: Properties on Mason Road, Harrisville, New Hampshire
- Coordinates: 42.9261°N 72.0836°W
- Area: 150 acres (61 ha)
- Architect: Lois Lilley Howe; Kendall, Taylor & Stevens
- Architectural style: Colonial Revival, Shingle Style, Georgian Revival
- MPS: Harrisville MRA
- NRHP reference No.: 86003079
- Added to NRHP: January 14, 1988

The Beech Hill Summer Home District encompasses a collection of six early 20th century summer houses in Harrisville, New Hampshire, built on a ridge overlooking Dublin Pond with views of nearby Mount Monadnock. The properties, a number of which were built for members of the Thayer family, lie on Mason Road, just north of the town line with Dublin. The most significant property of the six is the 140-acre (57 ha) Skyfield estate, whose large Georgian Revival mansion was designed by Lois Lilley Howe and built in 1916. The district is also notable as containing archaeological remnants of 18th century farmsteads, for which reason its properties are also listed in the Harrisville Rural District. The district was listed on the National Register of Historic Places in 1988.

Skyfield is a three-story U-shaped brick building, with a long main block and two projecting wings, and was built to replace an earlier Shingle style house. The Skyfield property includes a number of outbuildings, most of which date to the 19th century. These wood-frame structures include a barn (since remodeled for year-round residential use), an icehouse, laundry, toolshed, and garage. An 1884 farmhouse, built for the property's caretakers, is situated on the property near Venable Road.

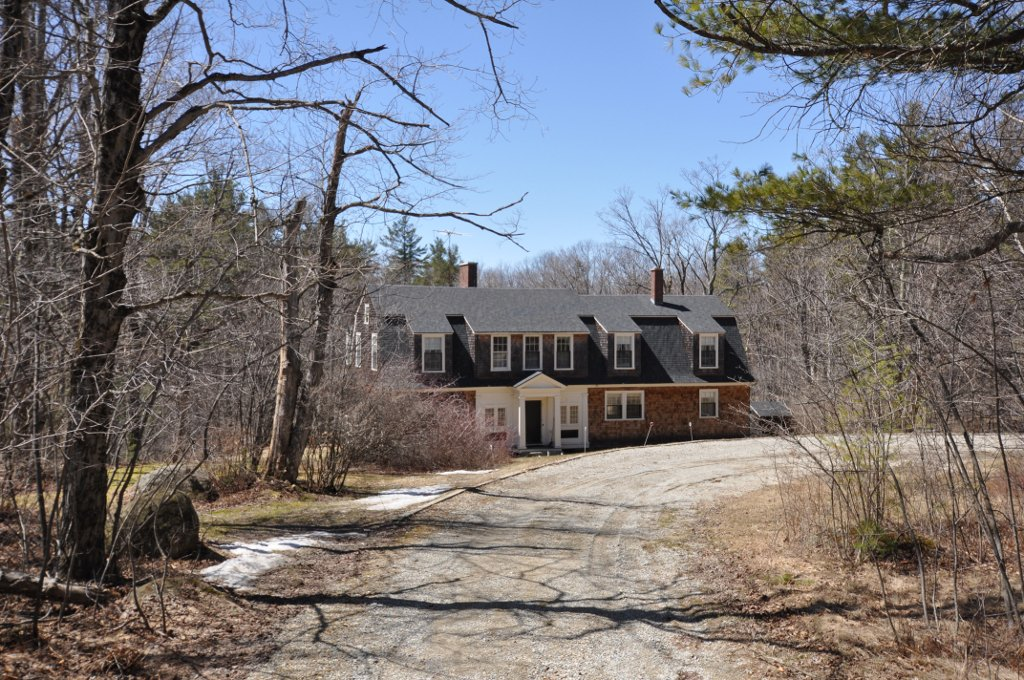

Several houses on Mason Road were built for members of the Thayer family around the turn of the 20th century. The L. H. Thayer House and the S. E. Thayer house, both located on the south side of Mason Road, were designed by the Boston firm of Kendall, Taylor and Stevens, and are among Harrisville's finest examples of Shingle style. A third house, built for L. E. Thayer in 1900, was destroyed by fire in 1975, and replaced by a Post-modern Shingle house with similar massing and sympathetic styling. This third house, along with several of Skyfield's outbuildings, do not contribute to the district's significance.

== See also ==
- National Register of Historic Places listings in Cheshire County, New Hampshire
