= George Bemis House =

Historic house in New Hampshire, United States

- U.S. National Register of Historic Places
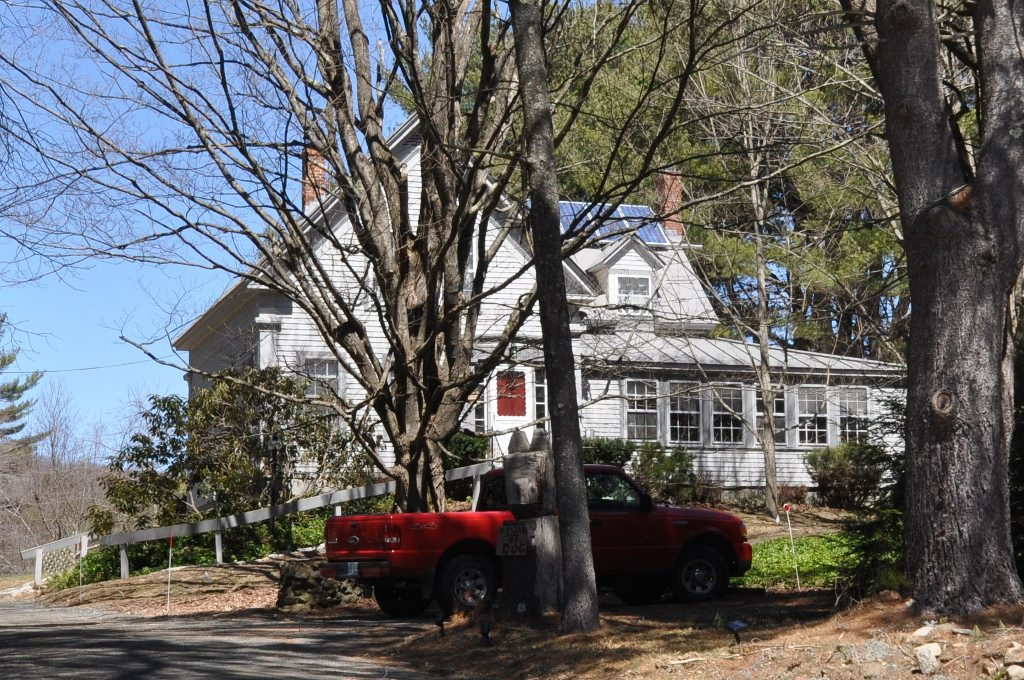

- Location within New Hampshire Location within the United States
- Location: Chesham Rd., Harrisville, New Hampshire
- Coordinates: 42°56′15″N 72°8′31″W
- Area: 1 acre (0.40 ha)
- Built: 1852
- Architectural style: Greek Revival
- MPS: Harrisville MRA
- NRHP reference No.: 86003248
- Added to NRHP: January 14, 1988

The George Bemis House is a historic house on Chesham Road in Harrisville, New Hampshire. Built in 1852, it is a good local example of Greek Revival architecture, and a near duplicate of the adjacent Elbridge G. Bemis House. The house was listed on the National Register of Historic Places in 1988.

== Description and history ==
The Elbridge G. Bemis House is located in a rural residential setting east of the village center of Chesham, on the north side of Chesham Road west of Chesham Pond. It is a 1½-story frame structure, with a gabled roof and clapboarded exterior. A substantial single-story gabled ell extends to its right, with an enclosed shed-roof porch extending across its front and around its side. The main block is three bays wide, with the main entrance in the right bay and two windows in the attic level. The building corners are pilastered, and the entry is framed by sidelight windows and a heavy entablature with a slightly peaked gable. The ell has a single gabled dormer on its front roof.

This house is one of a pair built in the 1850s for the Bemis brothers, who owned a sawmill and woodworking business in Chesham. The houses are among a handful of well-preserved examples of mid-19th century Greek Revival architecture in the town, and are significant for their association with the Bemises, who were a significant economic force within the town.

== See also ==
- National Register of Historic Places listings in Cheshire County, New Hampshire
