= Hancock (CDP), New Hampshire =

Census-designated place in New Hampshire, United States

Hancock, New Hampshire
- Census-designated place
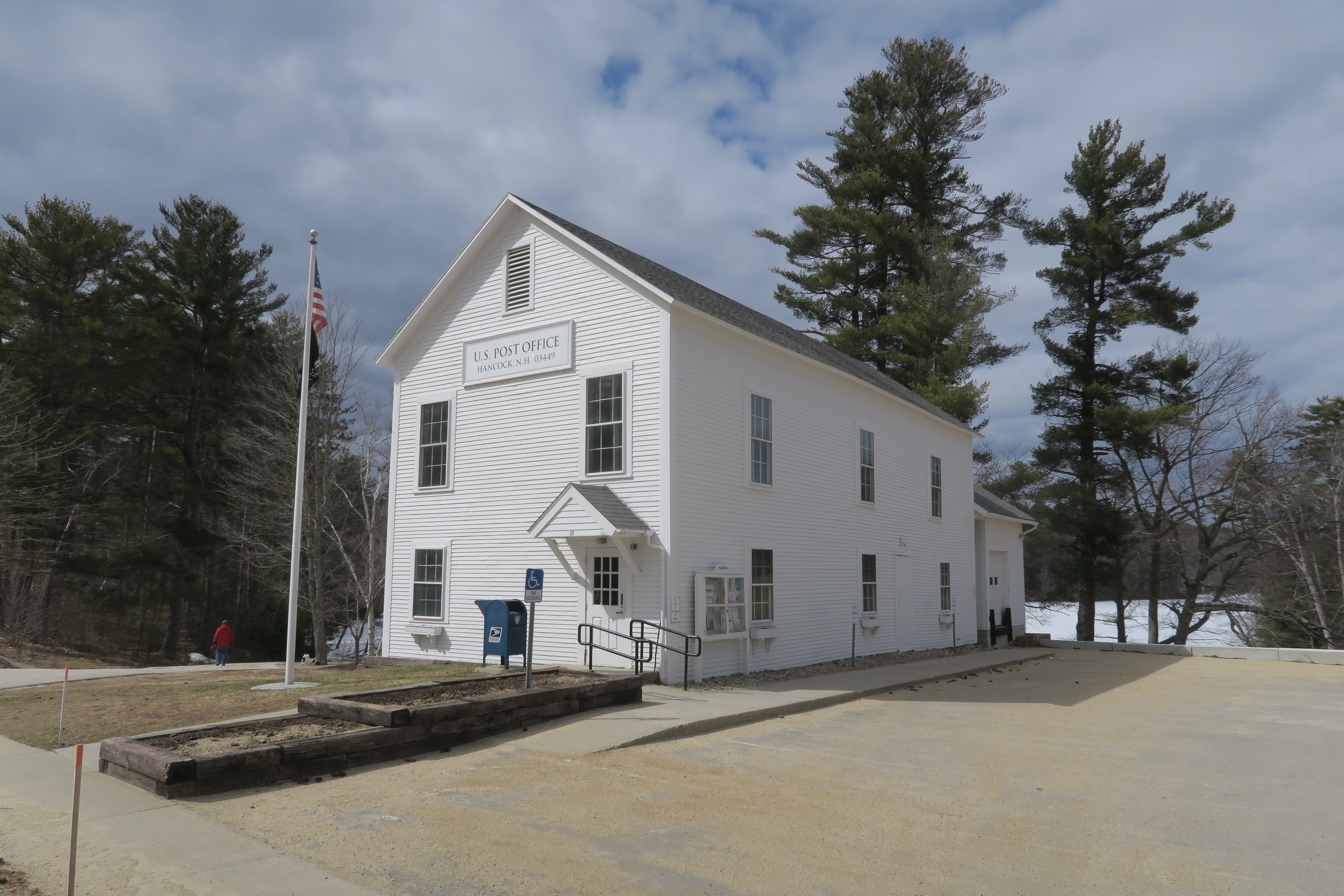
- Post Office

- Location within New Hampshire Location within the United States
- Coordinates: 42°58′23″N 71°58′47″W
- Country: United States
- State: New Hampshire
- County: Hillsborough
- Town: Hancock

Area
  - Total: 0.42 sq mi (1.09 km^{2})
  - Land: 0.36 sq mi (0.92 km^{2})
  - Water: 0.066 sq mi (0.17 km^{2})
- Elevation: 870 ft (270 m)

Population (2020)
  - Total: 213
  - Density: 598.1/sq mi (230.93/km^{2})
- Time zone: UTC-5 (Eastern (EST))
  - Summer (DST): UTC-4 (EDT)
- ZIP code: 03449
- Area code: 603
- FIPS code: 33-33620
- GNIS feature ID: 2629724

Hancock is a census-designated place (CDP) and the main village in the town of Hancock, New Hampshire, United States. The population of the CDP was 213 at the 2020 census, out of 1,731 in the entire town.

== Geography ==
The CDP is in the center of the town of Hancock and covers the compact village center as well as adjacent Norway Pond. Starting on the west side, the CDP follows Depot Road north past Norway Pond to Moose Brook, runs east along the brook then south to exclude the town recreation field, then heads northeast along Evergreen Hill Road. The east border of the CDP is east of Wilder Road but west of Antrim Road and Stearns Road. The south border of the CDP crosses Forest Road and follows Old Hancock Road and Main Street back to Depot Road.

New Hampshire Routes 123 and 137 combine in the center of the CDP for three blocks of Main Street. Route 123 leads southeast 8 miles (13 km) to Peterborough and northwest 11 miles (18 km) to Stoddard, while Route 137 leads northeast 4 miles (6 km) to Bennington and southwest 13 miles (21 km) to Jaffrey.

According to the U.S. Census Bureau, the Hancock CDP has a total area of 0.42 square miles (1.1 km^{2}), of which 0.3 square miles (0.9 km^{2}) are land and 0.1 square miles (0.2 km^{2}), or 15.20%, are water.

== Demographics ==
Historical population
Census	Pop.	Note	%±
2010	204		—
2020	213		4.4%
U.S. Decennial Census

As of the census of 2010, there were 204 people, 101 households, and 57 families residing in the CDP. There were 115 housing units, of which 14, or 12.2%, were vacant. The racial makeup of the CDP was 97.1% white, 0.5% African American, 0.5% Native American, 0.0% Asian, 0.0% Pacific Islander, 0.0% some other race, and 1.0% from two or more races. 1.5% of the population were Hispanic or Latino of any race.

Of the 101 households in the CDP, 21.8% had children under the age of 18 living with them, 49.5% were headed by married couples living together, 5.9% had a female householder with no husband present, and 43.6% were non-families. 37.6% of all households were made up of individuals, and 19.8% were someone living alone who was 65 years of age or older. The average household size was 2.02, and the average family size was 2.67.

17.6% of residents in the CDP were under the age of 18, 4.0% were from age 18 to 24, 15.2% were from 25 to 44, 35.3% were from 45 to 64, and 27.9% were 65 years of age or older. The median age was 53.0 years. For every 100 females, there were 74.4 males. For every 100 females age 18 and over, there were 71.4 males.

For the period 2011–15, the estimated median annual income for a household was $60,417, and the median income for a family was $81,000. The per capita income for the CDP was $38,697.
