= Pottersville District =

Historic district in New Hampshire, United States

- U.S. National Register of Historic Places
- U.S. Historic district
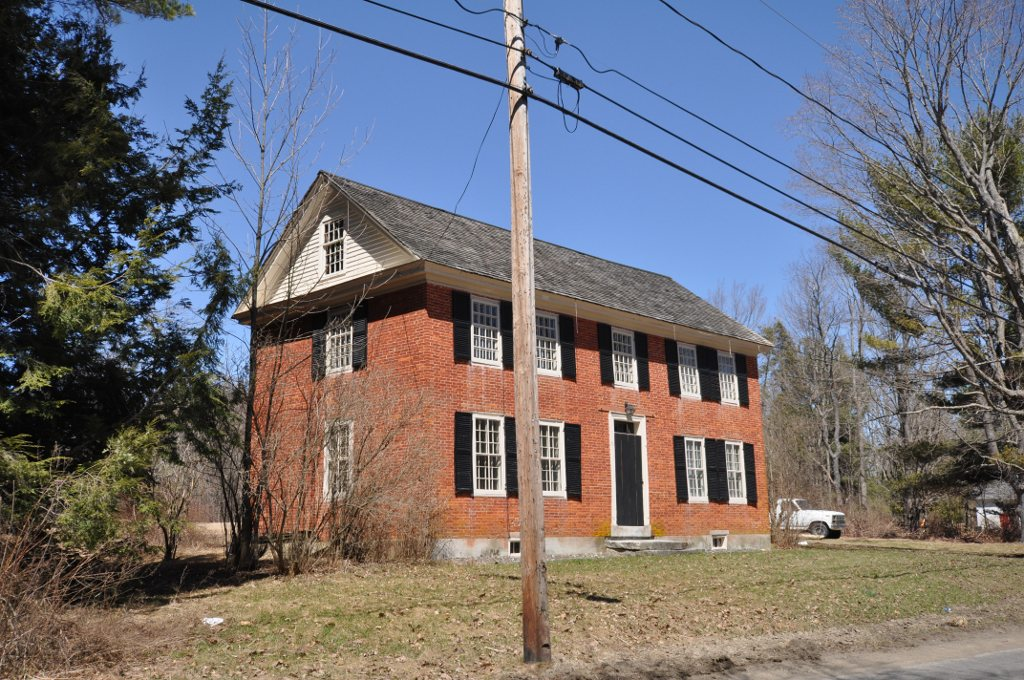

- Location within New Hampshire Location within the United States
- Location: Roughly intersection of Roxbury and Meadow Rds., and along Brown Rd. NE of Chesham Rd., Harrisville, New Hampshire
- Coordinates: 42.93066°N 72.14629°W
- Area: 93 acres (38 ha)
- Architectural style: Greek Revival
- MPS: Harrisville MRA
- NRHP reference No.: 86003096
- Added to NRHP: December 29, 1986

The Pottersville District encompasses the earliest non-Native settlement in Harrisville, New Hampshire, as well as sites of some of the town's earliest industrial activities. The 93-acre (38 ha) district includes forty buildings and two archaeological sites, and was listed on the National Register of Historic Places in 1986.

The Pottersville area was settled in the 1760s by migrants from Massachusetts. One house, built c. 1765, survives in the district from this time. The oldest church in Harrisville, now the Chesham Community Church, was built in 1797 by a Baptist congregation, and the town's oldest surviving schoolhouse, built 1840, stands next to the church. There are foundational remnants of early sawmills and gristmills, also built in the 1790s, near the outlet of Russell Reservoir. The area's most significant industrial history, however, is in pottery works that were established by 1795 and reached their height in the 1810s. As many as twelve pottery works operated in the area, supplying wares to a fairly wide region in central New England. All of these had failed to do increased competition by about 1860, and only industrial archaeological remains survive. At least two sites have been identified where waste materials from pottery works were dumped, and several kiln and workshop sites have been investigated.

The Pottersville District is a roughly rectangular area following Chesham and Brown Roads in southwestern Harrisville. Its western boundary is 100 feet (30 m) west of the junction of Chesham and Old Marlboro Roads, its eastern boundary is at a point on Brown Road roughly parallel to the eastern end of Russell Reservoir, and its northern and southern boundaries extend 350 feet (110 m) north and south from the line of the two roads.

== See also ==
- National Register of Historic Places listings in Cheshire County, New Hampshire
