= Hancock Village Historic District =

Historic district in New Hampshire, United States

- U.S. National Register of Historic Places
- U.S. Historic district
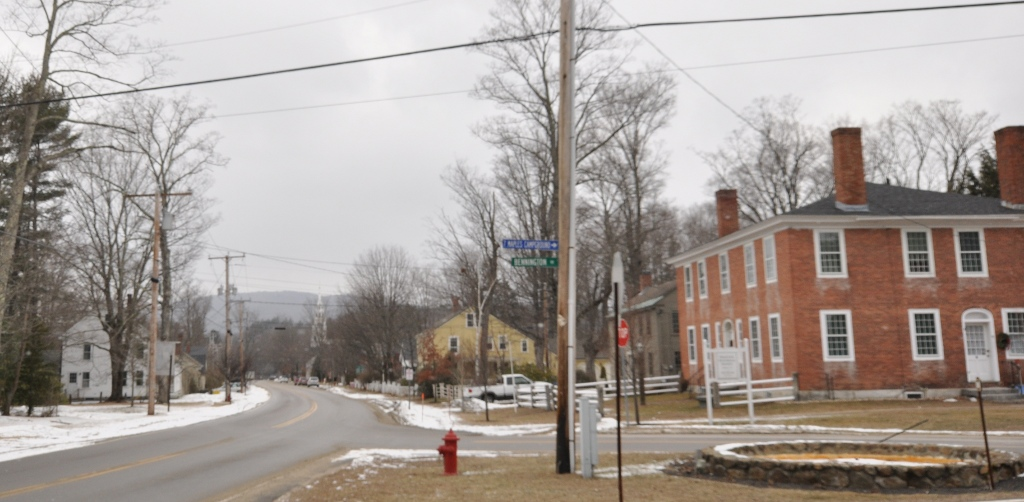
- Main Street, looking west from the junction with Bennington Street

- Location within New Hampshire Location within the United States
- Location: Main St. roughly between Norway Pond La. and Old Dublin Rd., and Bennington and Norway Hill Rds., Hancock, New Hampshire
- Coordinates: 42°58′22″N 71°58′59″W
- Area: 36.3 acres (14.7 ha)
- Architect: Multiple
- Architectural style: Greek Revival, Late Victorian, Federal
- NRHP reference No.: 88000178
- Added to NRHP: March 8, 1988

The Hancock Village Historic District encompasses the town center of Hancock, New Hampshire. It extends the length of Hancock's Main Street, from Pine Ridge Cemetery and the common to the west, and the junction of Bennington, Norway Hill, and Forest roads to the east. It then extends a short way up Bennington Road. The common was laid out in 1785, and the village developed nearby over the next 100+ years. The district was listed on the National Register of Historic Places in 1988.

== Description and history ==
Hancock Village is located near the geographic center of the rural hill town. The town was settled in the 1770s and was incorporated in 1780, but without provision for any public spaces. Because the exact geographic center of the town was located in a large marshy area, the residents were unable to agree on an alternative, and a state commission was appointed to choose the site of the common in 1785. The common and its immediate surrounding were dedicated to civic buildings and sites, including the town's first cemetery and animal pound, as well as the meeting house and an early school. An armory built on the common in the late 19th century was converted into a Grange hall. The common also has structures related to its conversion in the early 20th century to a public park, including a bandstand, fountain, and war memorial.

The Main Street area east of the common developed in the 19th century as a commercial and residential area for the town, with much of its development taking place in the first half of the 19th century. Almost all of the houses are vernacular Greek Revival or Federal in their styling. There are commercial buildings lining a portion of Main Street which are also predominantly vernacular mid-to-late 19th century in their construction.

== See also ==
- National Register of Historic Places listings in Hillsborough County, New Hampshire
