= Marlborough (CDP), New Hampshire =

Census-designated place in New Hampshire, United States

Marlborough, New Hampshire
- Census-designated place
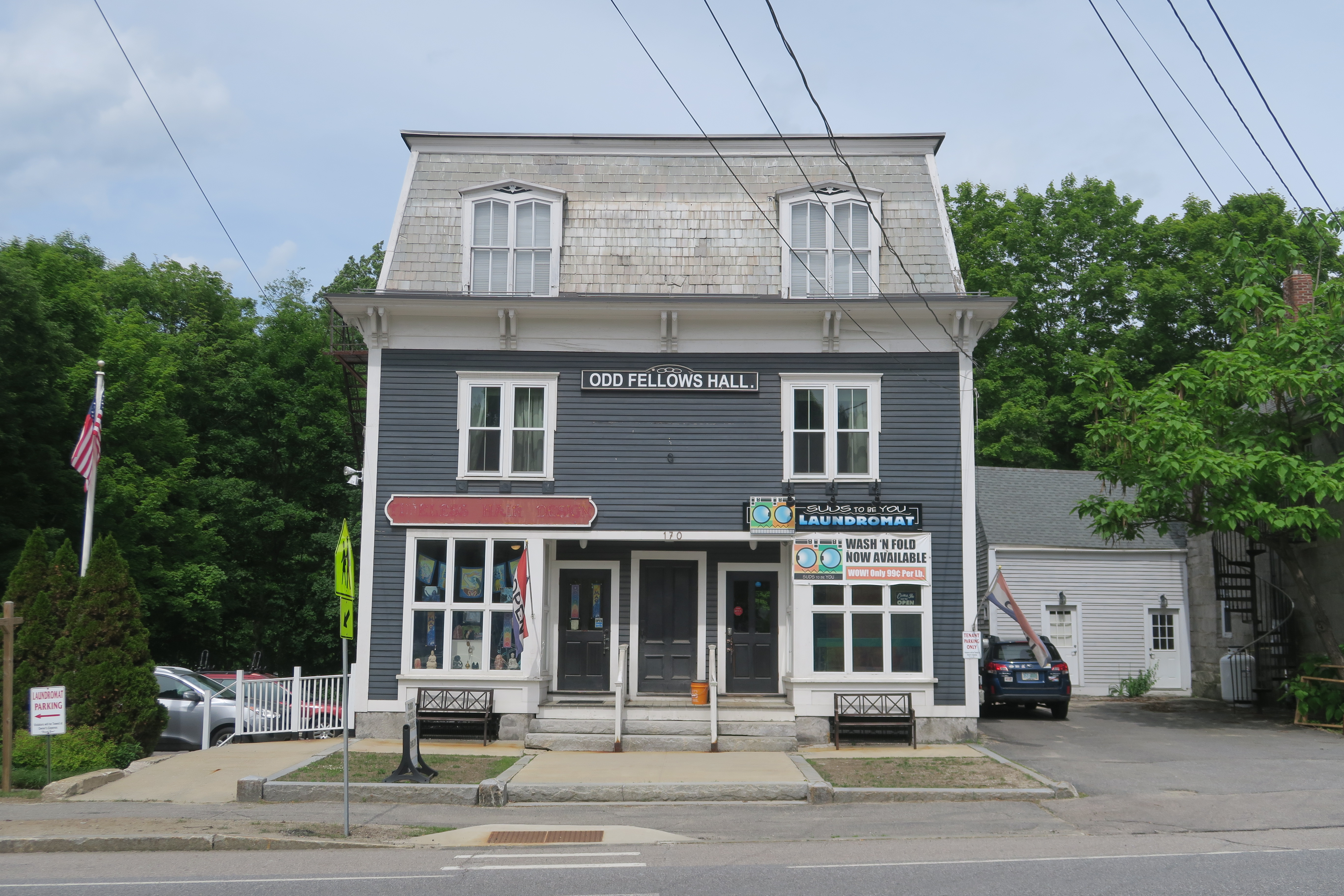
- Odd Fellows Hall

- Location within New Hampshire Location within the United States
- Coordinates: 42°54′18″N 72°12′42″W
- Country: United States
- State: New Hampshire
- County: Cheshire
- Town: Marlborough

Area
  - Total: 1.69 sq mi (4.37 km^{2})
  - Land: 1.69 sq mi (4.37 km^{2})
  - Water: 0 sq mi (0.00 km^{2})
- Elevation: 712 ft (217 m)

Population (2020)
  - Total: 1,066
  - Density: 631.9/sq mi (243.99/km^{2})
- Time zone: UTC-5 (Eastern (EST))
  - Summer (DST): UTC-4 (EDT)
- ZIP code: 03455
- Area code: 603
- FIPS code: 33-45380
- GNIS feature ID: 2378080

Marlborough is a census-designated place (CDP) and the main village in the town of Marlborough, New Hampshire, United States. The population of the CDP was 1,066 at the 2020 census, out of 2,096 in the entire town.

== Geography ==
The CDP is in the northwestern part of the town of Marlborough, in the valley of Minnewawa Brook, a westward-flowing tributary of The Branch and part of the Connecticut River watershed. The CDP is bordered to the northwest by the city of Keene and to the west by the town of Swanzey. The southern border of the CDP follows Laurel Street, Hill Street, Bixby Street, and Ryan Road, to the easternmost extent of the CDP at New Hampshire Route 101. The eastern border of the CDP follows NH 101 and Roxbury Road until north of Minnewawa Brook, and the northern border strikes west to the Keene line near Heath Road.

Route 101 (Marlborough's Main Street) leads east 15 miles (24 km) to Peterborough and west 5 miles (8 km) to its terminus at Route 9 on the western side of Keene. Route 124 has its western terminus at Route 101 in the center of the CDP, and leads southeast 12 miles (19 km) to Jaffrey.

According to the U.S. Census Bureau, the Marlborough CDP has a total area of 1.7 square miles (4.4 km^{2}), all of it recorded as land.

== Demographics ==
Historical population
Census	Pop.	Note	%±
1950	1,116		—
1960	1,097		−1.7%
1970	1,231		12.2%
1980	1,184		−3.8%
1990	1,211		2.3%
2000	1,089		−10.1%
2010	1,094		0.5%
2020	1,066		−2.6%
U.S. Decennial Census

As of the census of 2010, there were 1,094 people, 457 households, and 282 families residing in the CDP. There were 492 housing units, of which 35, or 7.1%, were vacant. The racial makeup of the town was 96.6% White, 0.6% African American, 0.0% Native American, 0.6% Asian, 0.0% Pacific Islander, 0.5% some other race, and 1.6% from two or more races. 1.1% of the population were Hispanic or Latino of any race.

Of the 457 households in the CDP, 28.4% had children under the age of 18 living with them, 42.5% were headed by married couples living together, 13.3% had a female householder with no husband present, and 38.3% were non-families. 25.6% of all households were made up of individuals, and 11.4% were someone living alone who was 65 years of age or older. The average household size was 2.39, and the average family size was 2.85.

21.2% of people in the CDP were under the age of 18, 7.7% were from 18 to 24, 26.7% were from 25 to 44, 27.1% were from 45 to 64, and 17.4% were 65 years of age or older. The median age was 40.1 years. For every 100 females, there were 97.8 males. For every 100 females age 18 and over, there were 94.6 males.

For the period 2011–15, the estimated median annual income for a household was $44,391, and the median income for a family was $54,038. The per capita income for the CDP was $27,466. 13.3% of the population and 12.9% of families were below the poverty line.
