= Chesham, New Hampshire =

Unincorporated community in New Hampshire, United States

- Chesham Village District
- U.S. National Register of Historic Places
- U.S. Historic district
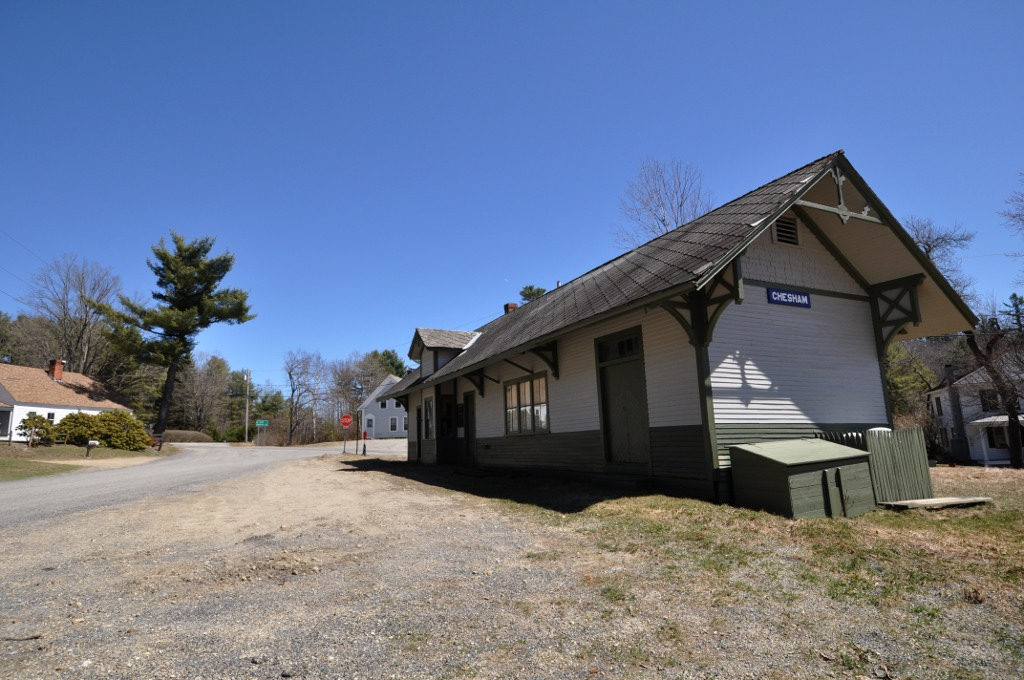
- The former Chesham railroad station

- Location within New Hampshire Location within the United States
- Location: Harrisville, NH; Roughly bounded by Yellow Wings, Seaver, Chesham, and Marienfield Rds.
- Coordinates: 42°55′50″N 72°8′55″W
- Area: 15 acres (6.1 ha)
- MPS: Harrisville MRA
- NRHP reference No.: 86003102
- Added to NRHP: December 29, 1986

Chesham is an unincorporated community within the town of Harrisville in Cheshire County, New Hampshire, United States. Part of the village is listed on the National Register of Historic Places as the Chesham Village District, while the southernmost portions are included in the Pottersville District, also listed on the National Register.

Chesham began as a nucleus of agricultural development in the early 19th century; the area saw increased development with the arrival of the railroad in 1880. This included the construction of the depot, and the adaptation by George Bemis of his property (across the street from the depot) as a livery stable. The area was given its name by George Chase, a summer visitor whose nearby estate in Dublin was called Chesham. Chase named it after the town of Chesham in Buckinghamshire, England, where the Chase family originated from in the 1600s.

The area's economic activity began to subside after the end of railroad service in 1936.

Chesham has an elementary school called Wells Memorial School. It has approximately 55 pupils up to grade 6.

The Community Church of Harrisville and Chesham was formed from Chesham Baptist Church and Harrisville Congregational Church. Chesham Baptist Church dates back to 1785. The church building was originally built in 1797, re-modeled in 1830, and again re-modeled in 1844.

The historic district consists mainly of a stretch of Chesham Road, extending eastward from its junction with Roxbury and Silver Lake Roads. The junction is one of the village's central points, where the railroad station and a surviving store building are located, as is the temple-fronted Greek Revival house of George Bemis. There are six houses in the district, ranging in style from the Greek Revival to the Colonial Revival.

== See also ==
- National Register of Historic Places listings in Cheshire County, New Hampshire
