= Contoocook Lake =

Lake in Cheshire County, New Hampshire

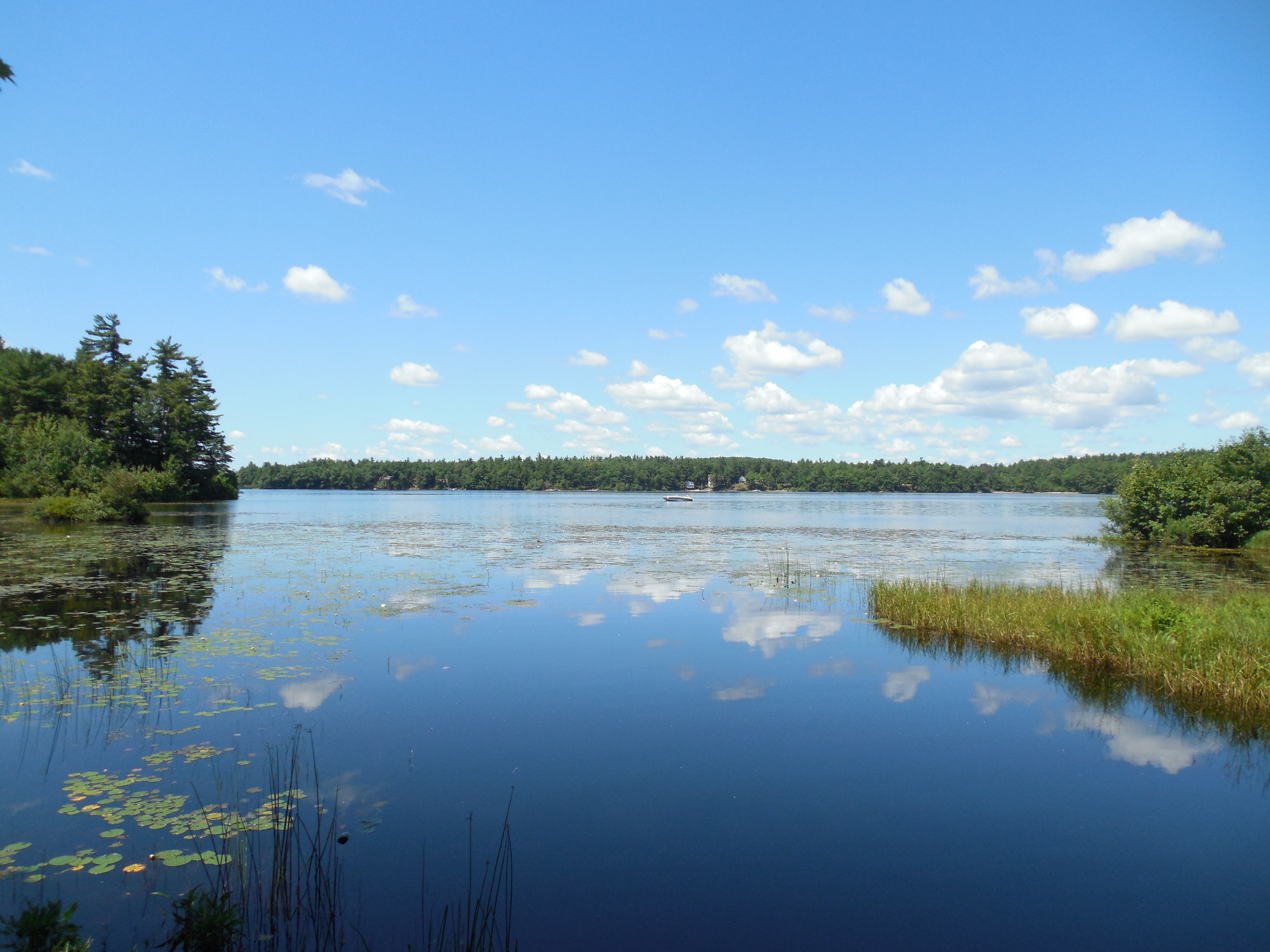

- Location within New Hampshire Location within the United States
- Location: Cheshire County, New Hampshire
- Coordinates: 42°47′12″N 72°0′45″W
- Primary outflows: Contoocook River
- Basin countries: United States
- Max. length: 2.8 mi (5 km)
- Max. width: 0.5 mi (1 km)
- Surface area: 344 acres (1.4 km^{2})
- Average depth: 7 ft (2.1 m)
- Max. depth: 23 ft (7.0 m)
- Surface elevation: 1,007 feet (307 m)
- Settlements: Rindge; Jaffrey

Contoocook Lake (/kənˈtʊkək/) is a 344-acre (1.4 km^{2}) water body located in Cheshire County in southwestern New Hampshire, United States, in the towns of Jaffrey and Rindge. The lake, along with Pool Pond, forms the headwaters of the Contoocook River, which flows north to the Merrimack River in Penacook, New Hampshire.

The lake is classified as a warmwater fishery, with observed species including largemouth bass, smallmouth bass, white perch, yellow perch, black crappie, bluegill, pumpkinseed, chain pickerel, and brown bullhead.

== See also ==
- List of lakes in New Hampshire
