= Hancock, New Hampshire =

- Town
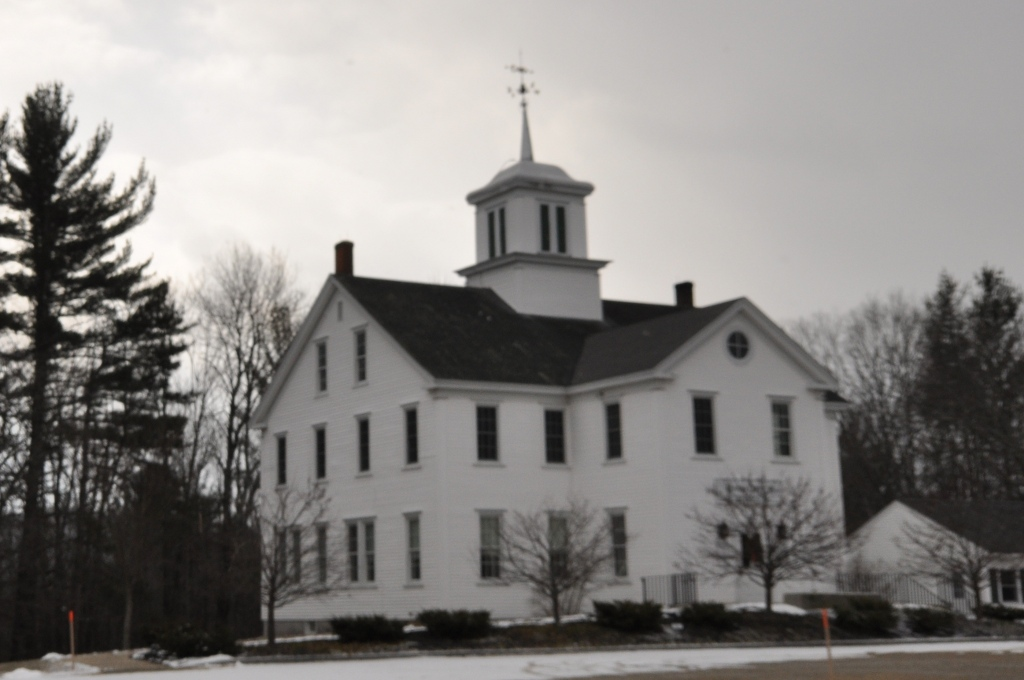
- Town Hall

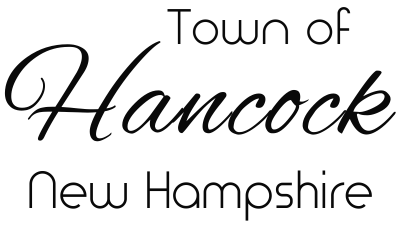
- Logo

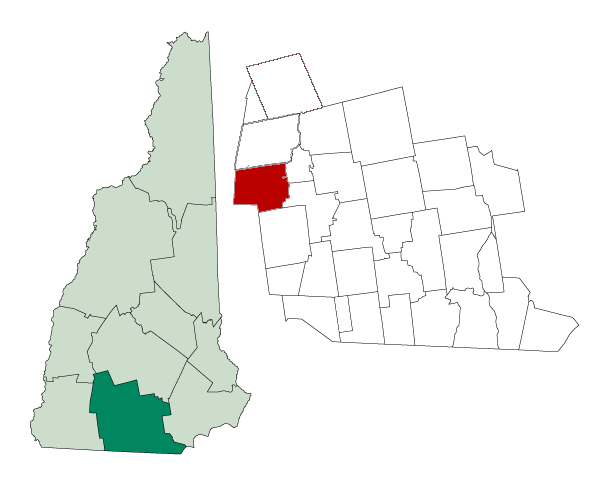
- Location in Hillsborough County, New Hampshire
- Coordinates: 42°59′30″N 72°00′40″W
- Country: United States
- State: New Hampshire
- County: Hillsborough
- Incorporated: 1779

Area
  - Total: 31.2 sq mi (80.9 km^{2})
  - Land: 30.0 sq mi (77.6 km^{2})
  - Water: 1.3 sq mi (3.3 km^{2}) 4.12%
- Elevation: 1,007 ft (307 m)

Population (2020)
  - Total: 1,731
  - Density: 58/sq mi (22.3/km^{2})
- Time zone: UTC-5 (Eastern)
  - Summer (DST): UTC-4 (Eastern)
- ZIP code: 03449
- Area code: 603
- FIPS code: 33-33700
- GNIS feature ID: 873618
- Website: www.hancocknh.org

Hancock is a town in Hillsborough County, New Hampshire, United States. The population was 1,731 at the 2020 census. Hancock is home to the Welch Family Farm Forest.

The main village of the town, where 213 people resided at the 2020 census, is defined as the Hancock census-designated place (CDP), and is located at the junction of New Hampshire routes 123 and 137.

== History ==
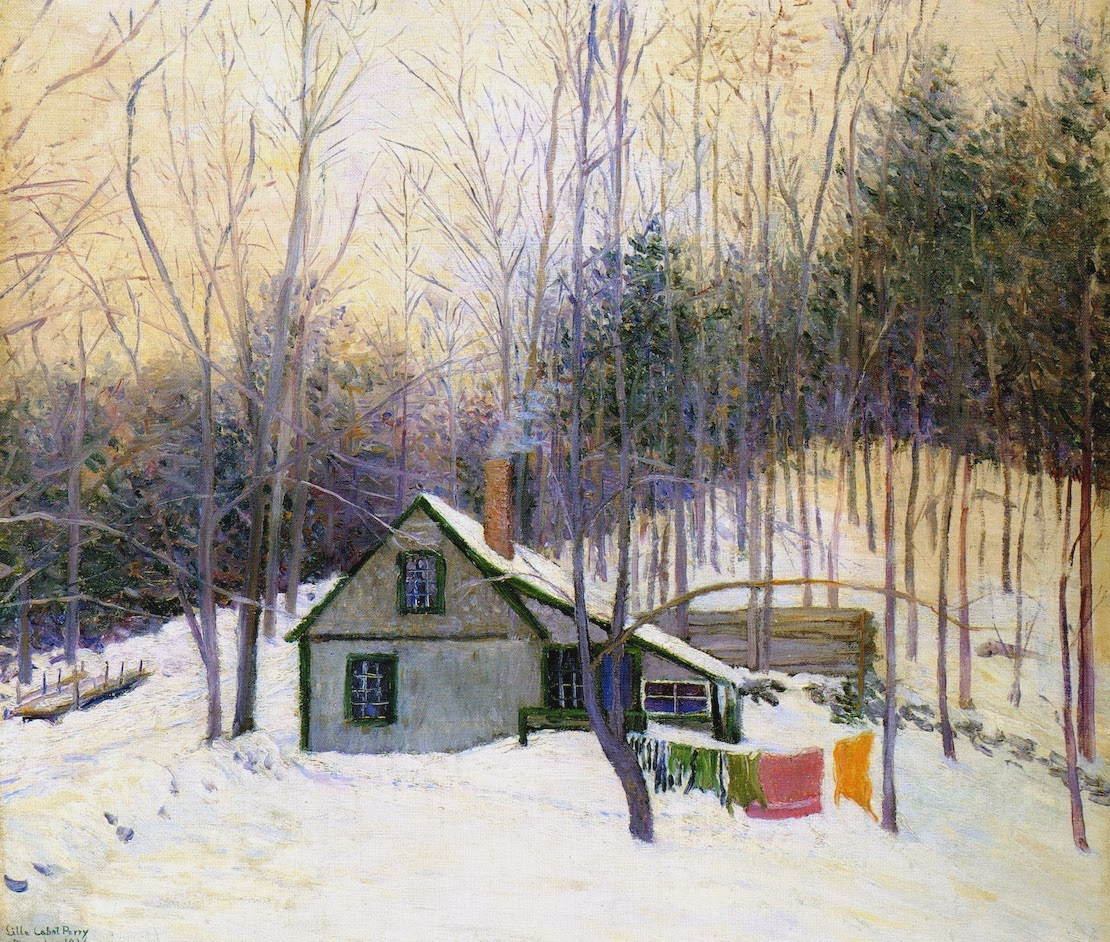
A Snowy Monday, 1926 (The Cooperage, Hancock, New Hampshire) by Lilla Cabot Perry

Hancock started as an unidentified settlement on the Contoocook River, in lands known as "Society Land" or "Cumberland", which had been reserved for the proprietors of the lands which became New Hampshire. First settled in 1764, the town was set off from Peterborough and incorporated in 1779, named "Hancock" in honor of John Hancock. A landowner of 1,875 acres (8 km^{2}) in the community, Hancock was the first governor of the state of Massachusetts, president of the Continental Congress, and signer of the Declaration of Independence.

Almost every building on Main Street in downtown Hancock is listed on the National Register of Historic Places as part of the Hancock Village Historic District. Hancock's Meetinghouse is home to Paul Revere's #236 bell, which chimes on the hour, day and night. The town does not have paved sidewalks, but gravel paths leading from home to home.

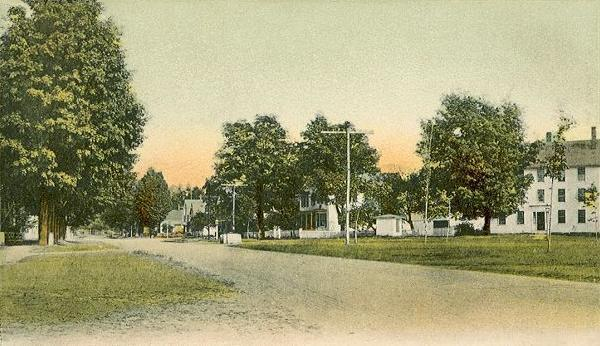
Main Street in 1907

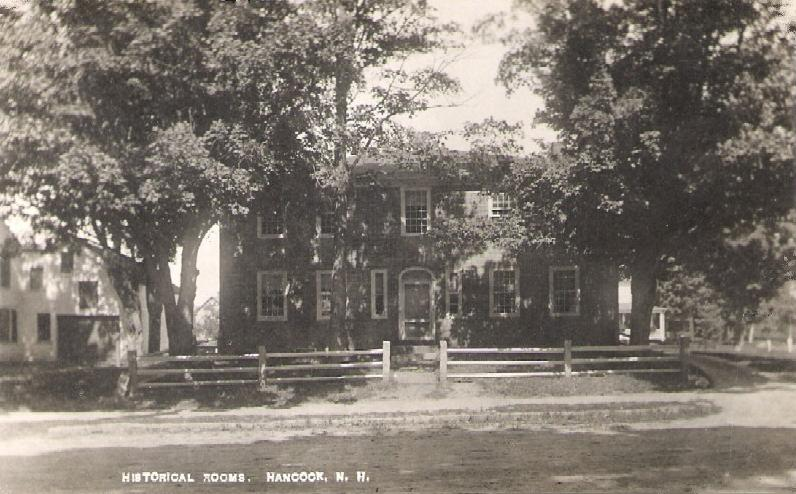
Historical Society in 1915

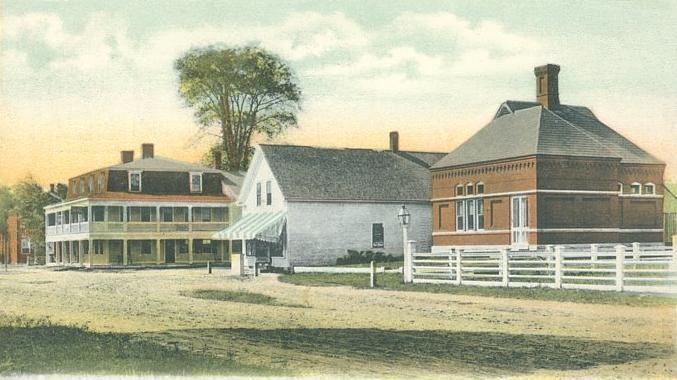
Old Library c. 1905

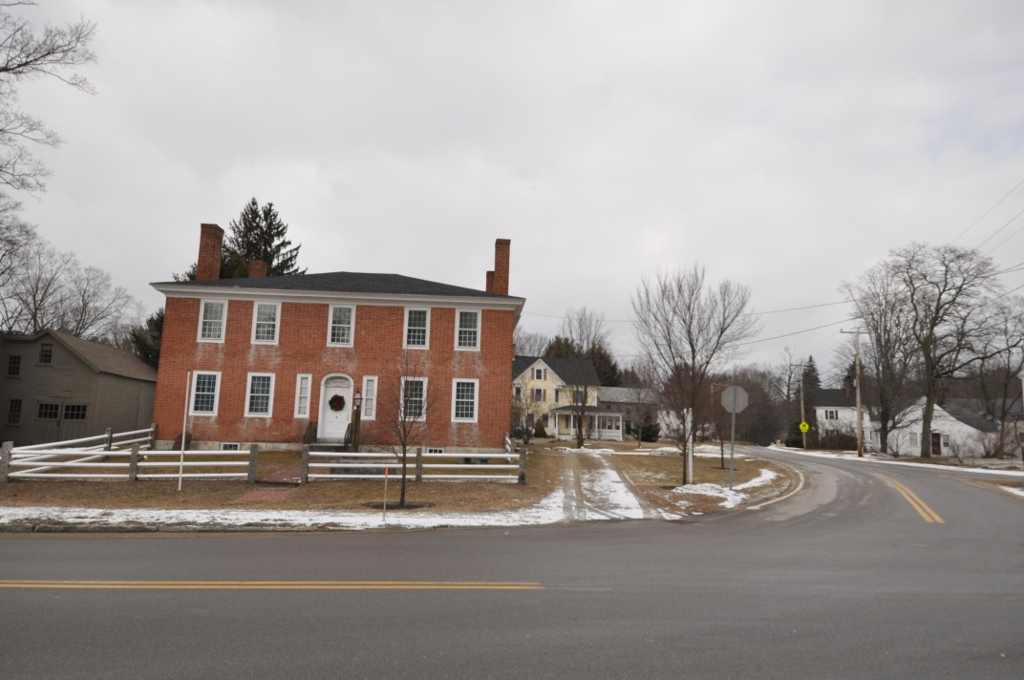
Bennington Road with Historical Society, 2013

== Geography ==
According to the United States Census Bureau, the town has a total area of 31.2 square miles (80.9 km^{2}), of which 30.0 square miles (77.6 km^{2}) are land and 1.3 square miles (3.3 km^{2}) are water, comprising 4.12% of the town. Hancock is drained by the Contoocook River, which flows northward along the eastern border of the town. Powder Mill Pond is in the east, and Nubanusit Lake is on the western border. Skatutakee Mountain, the highest point in Hancock, has an elevation of 2,002 feet (610 m) above sea level. Via the Contoocook River, Hancock lies fully within the Merrimack River watershed.

=== Adjacent municipalities ===
- Antrim (north)
- Bennington (northeast)
- Greenfield (east)
- Peterborough (south)
- Harrisville (southwest)
- Nelson (west)

== Demographics ==
Historical population
Census	Pop.	Note	%±
1790	634		—
1800	1,120		76.7%
1810	1,184		5.7%
1820	1,178		−0.5%
1830	1,316		11.7%
1840	1,345		2.2%
1850	1,012		−24.8%
1860	844		−16.6%
1870	692		−18.0%
1880	689		−0.4%
1890	637		−7.5%
1900	642		0.8%
1910	642		0.0%
1920	531		−17.3%
1930	561		5.6%
1940	631		12.5%
1950	612		−3.0%
1960	722		18.0%
1970	909		25.9%
1980	1,193		31.2%
1990	1,604		34.5%
2000	1,739		8.4%
2010	1,654		−4.9%
2020	1,731		4.7%
2024 (est.)	1,753		1.3%
U.S. Decennial Census

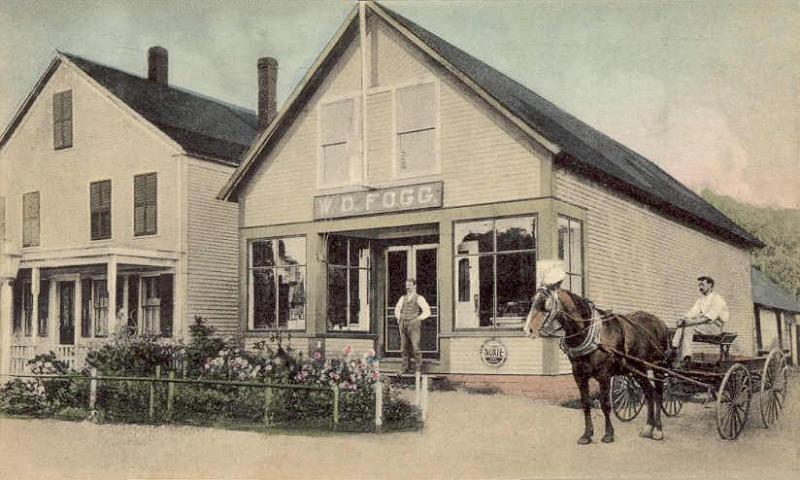
W. D. Fogg's Store c. 1906

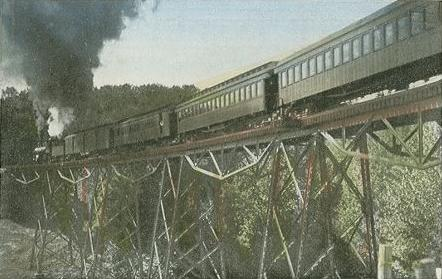
Alcott Trestle c. 1905

As of the census of 2010, there were 1,654 people, 724 households, and 484 families residing in the town. There were 864 housing units, of which 140, or 16.2%, were vacant. 91 of the vacant units were for seasonal or recreational use. The racial makeup of the town was 97.4% white, 0.4% African American, 0.1% Native American, 0.8% Asian, 0.0% Native Hawaiian or Pacific Islander, 0.2% some other race, and 1.1% from two or more races. 1.0% of the population were Hispanic or Latino of any race.

Of the 724 households, 23.2% had children under the age of 18 living with them, 57.6% were headed by married couples living together, 6.5% had a female householder with no husband present, and 33.1% were non-families. 27.6% of all households were made up of individuals, and 13.1% were someone living alone who was 65 years of age or older. The average household size was 2.26, and the average family size was 2.71.

In the town, 17.9% of the population were under the age of 18, 6.0% were from 18 to 24, 15.9% from 25 to 44, 37.9% from 45 to 64, and 22.2% were 65 years of age or older. The median age was 50.8 years. For every 100 females, there were 90.1 males. For every 100 females age 18 and over, there were 87.8 males.

For the period 2011–2015, the estimated median annual income for a household was $77,788, and the median income for a family was $89,773. Male full-time workers had a median income of $61,944 versus $47,604 for females. The per capita income for the town was $45,544. 4.6% of the population and 3.3% of families were below the poverty line. 5.2% of the population under the age of 18 and 2.8% of those 65 or older were living in poverty.

== Education ==
Hancock is part of SAU (School Administrative Unit) #1, which is a school district that includes 9 towns, better known as the Contoocook Valley Regional School District. Students from Hancock attend the following schools:

- Elementary: Hancock Elementary School, located in Hancock
- Middle: Great Brook School, located in Antrim
- High: ConVal Regional High School, located in Peterborough

== Transportation ==
Two New Hampshire state routes and one U.S. Highway cross Hancock:

- New Hampshire Route 123 enters the town in the southeast from Peterborough, duplexed with US 202. Immediately upon entering the town, it leaves on its own as Peterborough Road, traveling north towards the town center. In the central village of Hancock, it merges briefly with NH 137 as a wrong-way concurrency along Stoddard Road. After NH 137 leaves to the south, NH 123 continues to the northeast, leaving into the town of Antrim.
- New Hampshire Route 137 enters the town in the south-central part of town from Harrisville, following Bonds Corner Road. After its short wrong-way concurrency with NH 123, it turns northeast along Bennington Road before reaching its northern terminus at US 202 near the town's border with Bennington.
- U.S. Route 202 enters the town in the southeast from Peterborough, duplexed with NH 123. After 123 leaves just upon entering town, US 202 continues along Concord Road, passing Powder Mill Pond, before passing the northern terminus of NH 137 and entering the town of Bennington at Hancock's eastern border.

== Sites of interest ==
- Hancock Historical Society Museum
- Very Long Baseline Array radio telescope

== Notable people ==
- A. A. Ames (1842–1911), corrupt former mayor of Minneapolis, arrested in Hancock in February 1903
- Thelma Babbitt (1906–2004), Quaker activist, environmentalist
- Eli Bremer (born 1978), Olympic athlete
- Oren B. Cheney (1816–1903), abolitionist, Free Baptist preacher, founder of Bates College
- Person C. Cheney (1828–1901), paper manufacturer, abolitionist, Republican politician
- Matthew Donovan (born 1958), Acting Secretary of the Air Force
- Wayne Green (1922–2013), publisher
- Joseph Grew (1880–1965), US ambassador to four countries
- Howard Mansfield (born 1957), author
- Charles E. Merrill Jr. (1920–2017), educator, founded the Commonwealth School in Boston
- Jay Pierrepont Moffat (1896–1943), US ambassador to Canada
- Jay Pierrepont Moffat Jr. (1932–2020), US ambassador to Chad
- Sy Montgomery (born 1958), author, naturalist, scriptwriter
- Lilla Cabot Perry (1848–1933), artist
