= Skatutakee Lake =

Lake in the U.S. state of New Hampshire

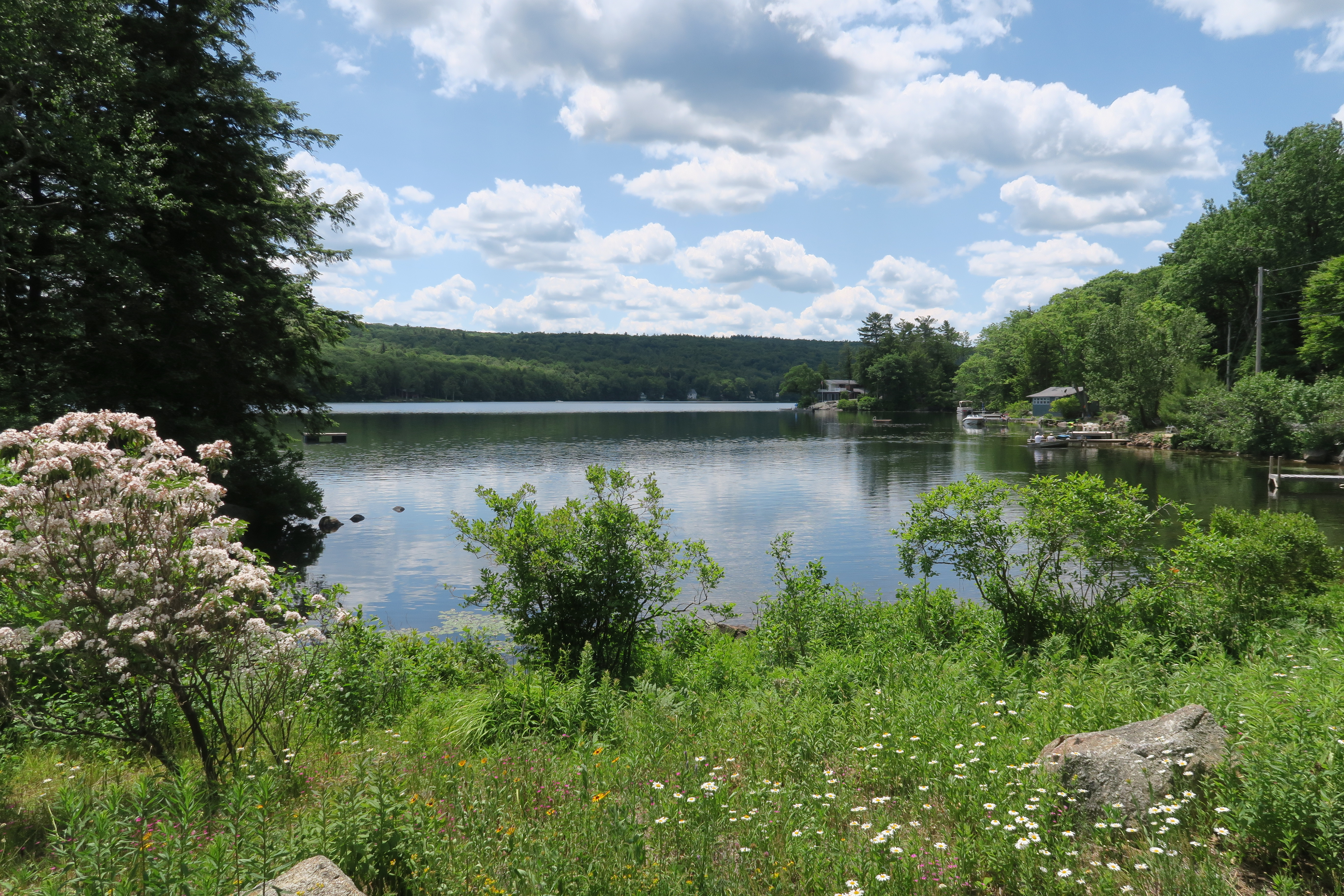

- Location within New Hampshire Location within the United States
- Location: Cheshire County, New Hampshire
- Coordinates: 42°56′16″N 72°4′28″W
- Primary inflows: Nubanusit Brook
- Primary outflows: Nubanusit Brook
- Basin countries: United States
- Max. length: 1.7 mi (2.7 km)
- Max. width: 0.3 mi (0.48 km)
- Surface area: 236 acres (0.96 km^{2})
- Average depth: 10 ft (3.0 m)
- Max. depth: 17 ft (5.2 m)
- Surface elevation: 1,201 ft (366 m)
- Islands: 1
- Settlements: Harrisville

Skatutakee Lake is a 236-acre (0.96 km^{2}) water body located in Cheshire County in southwestern New Hampshire, United States, in the town of Harrisville. Water from Skatutakee Lake flows via Nubanusit Brook to the Contoocook River in Peterborough and ultimately to the Merrimack River.

The lake is classified as a warmwater fishery, with observed species including smallmouth and largemouth bass, chain pickerel, horned pout, northern pike, and black crappie.

== See also ==
- List of lakes in New Hampshire
