= Harrisville Historic District (Harrisville, New Hampshire) =

Historic district in New Hampshire, United States

- U.S. National Register of Historic Places
- U.S. National Historic Landmark District
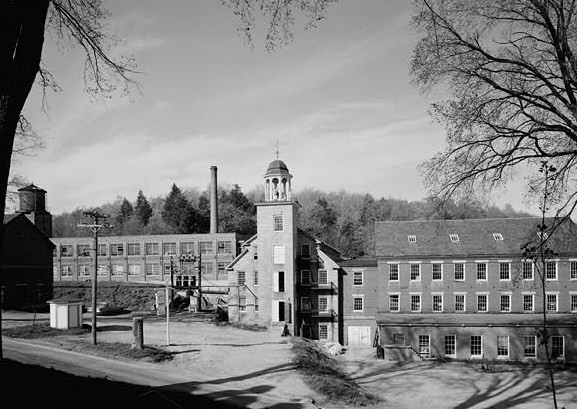
- Cheshire Mills, 1969

- Location within New Hampshire Location within the United States
- Location: Harrisville, New Hampshire and vicinity
- Coordinates: 42°56′42″N 72°5′37″W
- Architect: Multiple
- MPS: Harrisville MRA (AD)
- NRHP reference No.: 71000072

Significant dates
- Added to NRHP: September 17, 1971
- Designated NHLD: December 22, 1977

Harrisville Historic District is a well-preserved historic New England mill village located in the southwest part of New Hampshire. It consists of about 200 acres (0.81 km^{2}) and about 135 structures. It was declared a National Historic Landmark in 1977.

The district is located about 10 miles (16 km) east of Keene, New Hampshire, then 3 miles (4.8 km) north on Harrisville-Dublin Road from New Hampshire Route 101.

== History ==
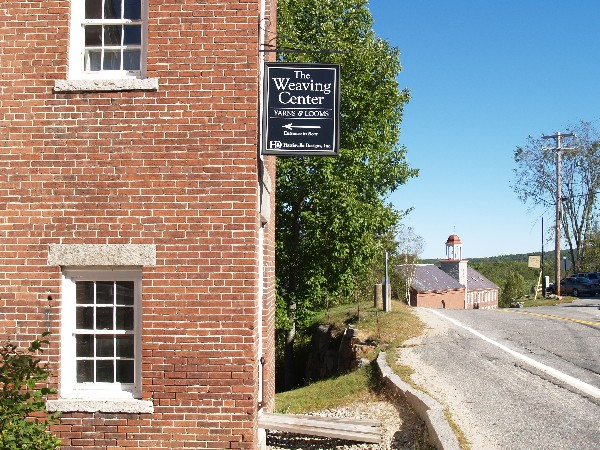
Harrisville Historic District in 2005 with Harris Mill on the left, and Cheshire Mill in the distance.

The area of what is today the town of Harrisville, New Hampshire was originally part of the towns of Dublin and Nelson, in Cheshire County. The site of the village is located on hilly terrain on a ridge that forms the divide between the Connecticut and Merrimack rivers, approximately 1,300 feet (400 m) above sea level.

In 1774, Abel Twitchel built a combination grist and saw mill on a stream running through the village. Later, Jason Harris built a blacksmith shop in the village, which until 1830 was known as Twitchell's Mills. In 1799, Jonas Clark built a clothing mill for fulling and dressing cloth. His wife also spun linen thread in the same mill. The Clarks sold their mill to James Horsley in 1804 and moved to Canada. By this time Clark's grist mill had been fitted with a wool carding machine, installed by Bethuel Harris and Abel Twitchell. It is claimed that this was only the second such machine to be installed in the entire United States.

In 1822, Bethuel and Cyrus Harris constructed a brick mill on the stream for the manufacture of woolen cloths. The machinery for the mill was installed by Milan Harris. In 1833 Milan Harris and A.S. Hutchinson built a new mill, referred to as the "Upper Mill", on the site of the old grist and saw-mill. The "Upper Mill", now known as the Harris Mill, is now owned Historic Harrisville, Inc. and occupied by Harrisville Designs, which was established in 1971 to help preserve the history of the manufacture of wool yarn and cloth in the village.

Cheshire Mill No. 1, with its distinctive bell tower, was constructed in 1848 by Cyrus Harris from New Hampshire granite. It was one of the last remaining operational textile mills in New England, closing its doors in 1970. The site also includes the abutting Cheshire Mill No. 2, a red brick structure built in 1859, as well as Cheshire Mill No. 3, 4 and 5, built in the early 20th century.

The National Historic Landmark District also includes numerous historic homes and worker cottages, several churches, a storehouse, general store and a cemetery.

== See also ==
- List of National Historic Landmarks in New Hampshire
- National Register of Historic Places listings in Cheshire County, New Hampshire
