= Nubanusit Lake =

Lake in New Hampshire, United States

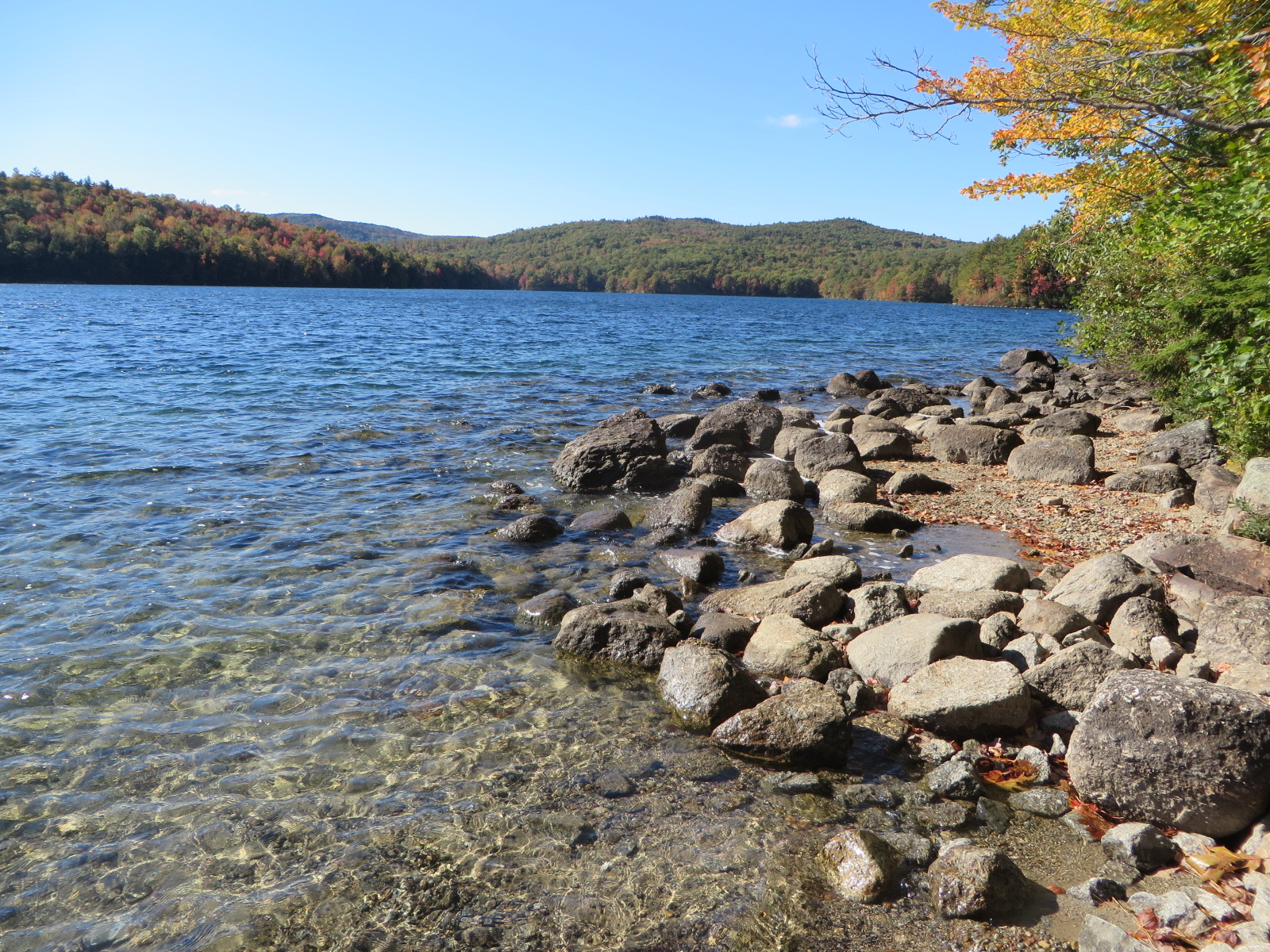

- Location within New Hampshire Location within the United States
- Location: Cheshire County and Hillsborough County, New Hampshire
- Coordinates: 42°59′1″N 72°3′43″W
- Primary outflows: Nubanusit Brook
- Basin countries: United States
- Max. length: 3.7 mi (6.0 km)
- Max. width: 0.6 mi (0.97 km)
- Surface area: 718 acres (2.91 km^{2})
- Average depth: 40 ft (12 m)
- Max. depth: 97 ft (30 m)
- Surface elevation: 1,375 feet (419 m)
- Islands: 2
- Settlements: Nelson; Hancock

Nubanusit Lake is a 718-acre (2.91 km^{2}) lake located on the border between Cheshire and Hillsborough counties in southwestern New Hampshire, United States, in the towns of Nelson and Hancock. The outlet of the lake is Nubanusit Brook, a tributary of the Contoocook River in the Merrimack River drainage basin.

The lake is classified as a coldwater fishery, with observed species including rainbow trout, lake trout, smallmouth bass, chain pickerel, yellow perch, and horned pout.

== See also ==
- List of lakes in New Hampshire
