= Nubanusit Brook =

Stream in New Hampshire, United States

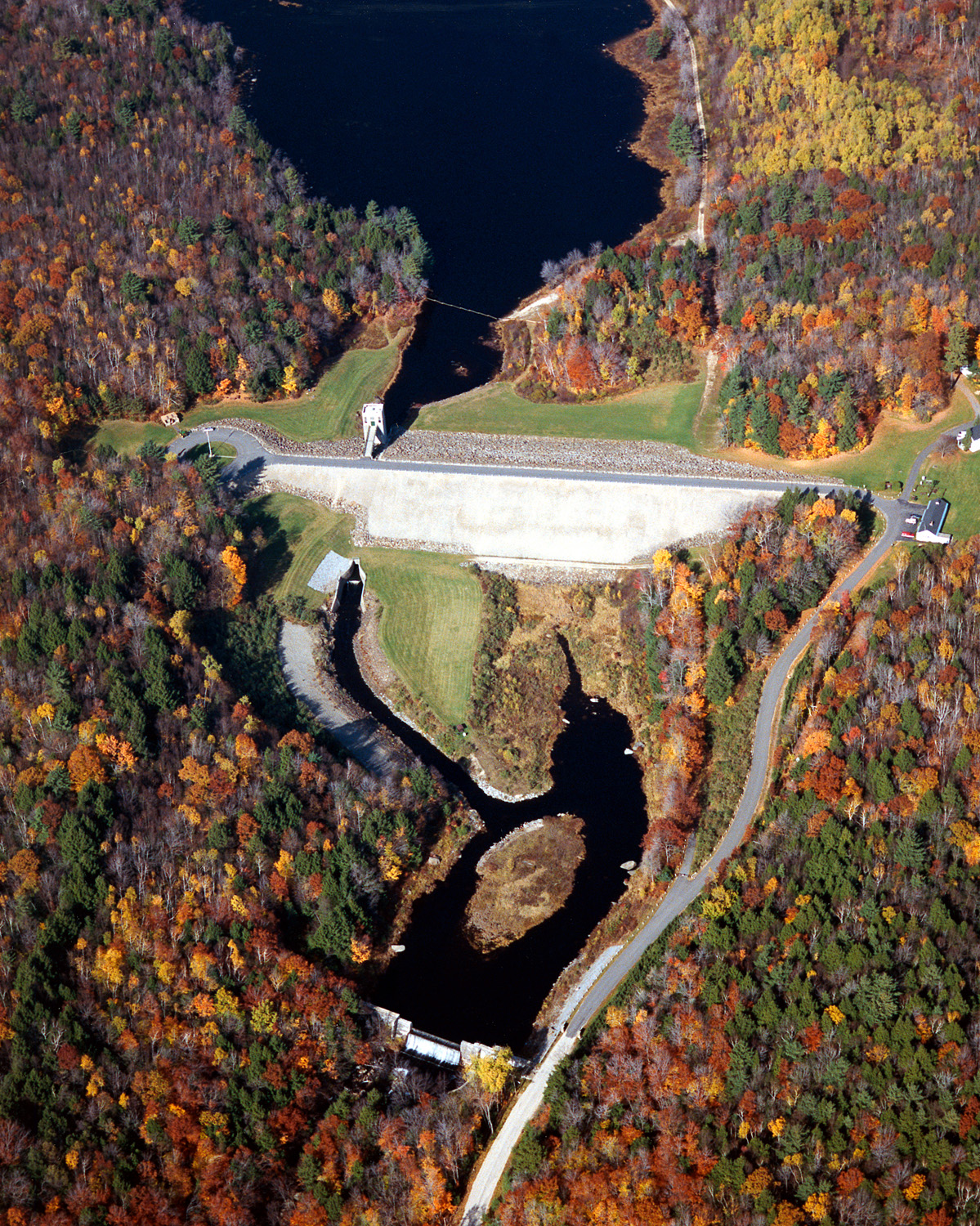
- Edward MacDowell Dam and Lake on Nubanusit Brook

- Location within New Hampshire Location within the United States

Location
- Country: United States
- State: New Hampshire
- Counties: Cheshire, Hillsborough
- Towns: Nelson, Harrisville, Dublin, Peterborough

Physical characteristics
- Source: Nubanusit Lake
  - location: Nelson
  - coordinates: 42°58′26″N 72°5′8″W
  - elevation: 1,375 ft (419 m)
- Mouth: Contoocook River
  - location: Peterborough
  - coordinates: 42°52′31″N 71°56′56″W
  - elevation: 710 ft (220 m)
- Length: 14.3 mi (23.0 km)

Basin features
- Tributaries
  - left: Jaquith Brook
  - right: Brickyard Brook, Brush Brook

Nubanusit Brook is a 14.3 mi (23.0 km) long stream in southern New Hampshire in the United States. The brook begins at the outlet of Nubanusit Lake in Nelson. It is a tributary of the Contoocook River, part of the Merrimack River watershed. The brook flows south into Harrisville, interrupted by Harrisville Pond and Skatutakee Lake, then east to the MacDowell Reservoir (constructed for flood control) in Peterborough. The brook turns south, passes the village of West Peterborough, and reaches the Contoocook River after passing through Peterborough village.

Nubanusit Brook was important to the establishment and development of Harrisville and Peterborough because many dams were built along it to provide water power to mills. These included substantial textile mills in Harrisville, West Peterborough, and Peterborough, as well as smaller mills along the brook's course.

== See also ==
- List of rivers of New Hampshire
