= Harrisville, New Hampshire =

- Town
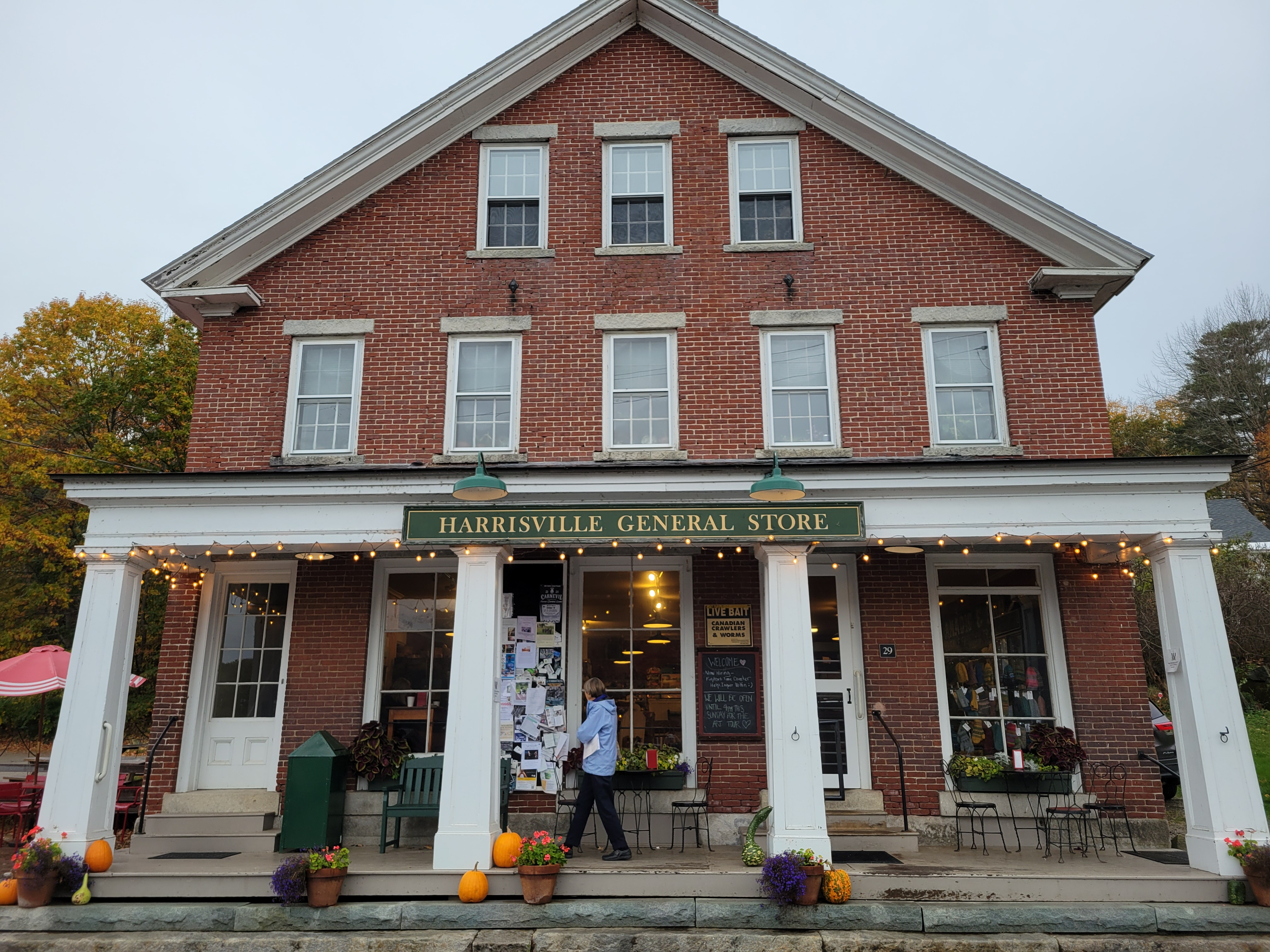
- Harrisville General Store

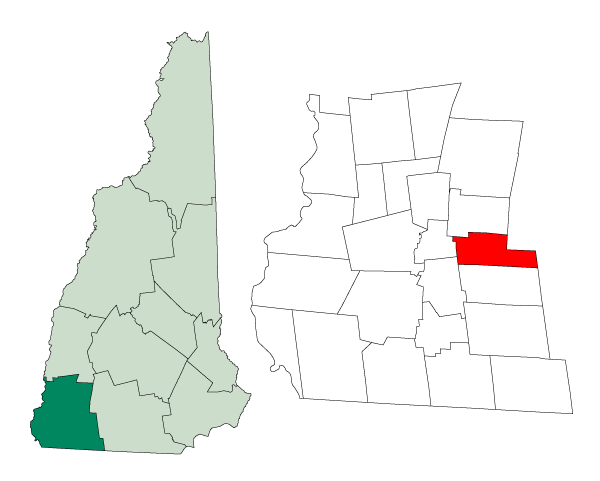
- Location in Cheshire County, New Hampshire
- Coordinates: 42°56′42″N 72°05′47″W
- Country: United States
- State: New Hampshire
- County: Cheshire
- Incorporated: 1870
- Villages: Harrisville; Chesham

Area
  - Total: 20.2 sq mi (52.4 km^{2})
  - Land: 18.6 sq mi (48.3 km^{2})
  - Water: 1.6 sq mi (4.1 km^{2}) 7.79%
- Elevation: 1,217 ft (371 m)

Population (2020)
  - Total: 984
  - Density: 53/sq mi (20.4/km^{2})
- Time zone: UTC-5 (Eastern)
  - Summer (DST): UTC-4 (Eastern)
- ZIP code: 03450
- Area code: 603
- FIPS code: 33-34420
- GNIS feature ID: 873620
- Website: www.harrisvillenh.org

Harrisville is a town in Cheshire County, New Hampshire, United States. Beyond the town center, the villages of Chesham and Eastview are included. The population of the town was 984 at the 2020 census, and an estimated 1,000 in 2025.

It is a well preserved 19th-century mill town located in the Monadnock region of southern New Hampshire.

== History ==
Harrisville claims to be the only industrial community of the early 19th century to endure in its original form. First known as "Twitchell's Mills", a combination sawmill and gristmill was built here in 1774. The town of Harrisville was formed in 1870 from lands ceded by Marlborough, Dublin, Hancock, Nelson, and Roxbury. The Manchester & Keene Railroad opened in 1878, helping it prosper as a textile mill town. It was named for Milan Harris, whose stone and brick Cheshire Mills operated until 1970, but look virtually unchanged since the mid-19th century.

Today, the Cheshire Mills are protected as part of the Harrisville Historic District, a National Historic Landmark which includes the center of town. With its red brick buildings and mills reflected in Harrisville Pond and canal, the village is frequently photographed as an iconic example of picturesque old New England. The Harrisville Rural District includes the southern part of the town near the Dublin border.

Since 1794, there has been a woolen mill in Harrisville. In 1971, after his family's Cheshire Mills business shuttered, local resident John “Chick” Colony launched Harrisville Designs. Harrisville Designs produces yarn, looms, loom parts and knitting patterns; in addition to offering weaving and other textile classes on site. It sells locally and nationwide.

The Harrisville General Store, established in 1838, which opened more than 30 years before Harrisville officially formed, is intrinsically woven into the fabric of the town. The general store is part of the town’s historic district, and has been owned by Historic Harrisville since 2008. “It started as a true general store, serving the inhabitants of this small village, which were mostly workers at the textile mill across the street,” manager Laura Carden says.

Each summer, the town hosts "Old Home Days," which was originally envisioned as a celebration of the agrarian way of life and the renewal of old friendships," said Steve Taylor, former N.H. Commissioner of Agriculture, Markets & Food. "These days, it offers an important opportunity to celebrate community life and meet with your neighbors."

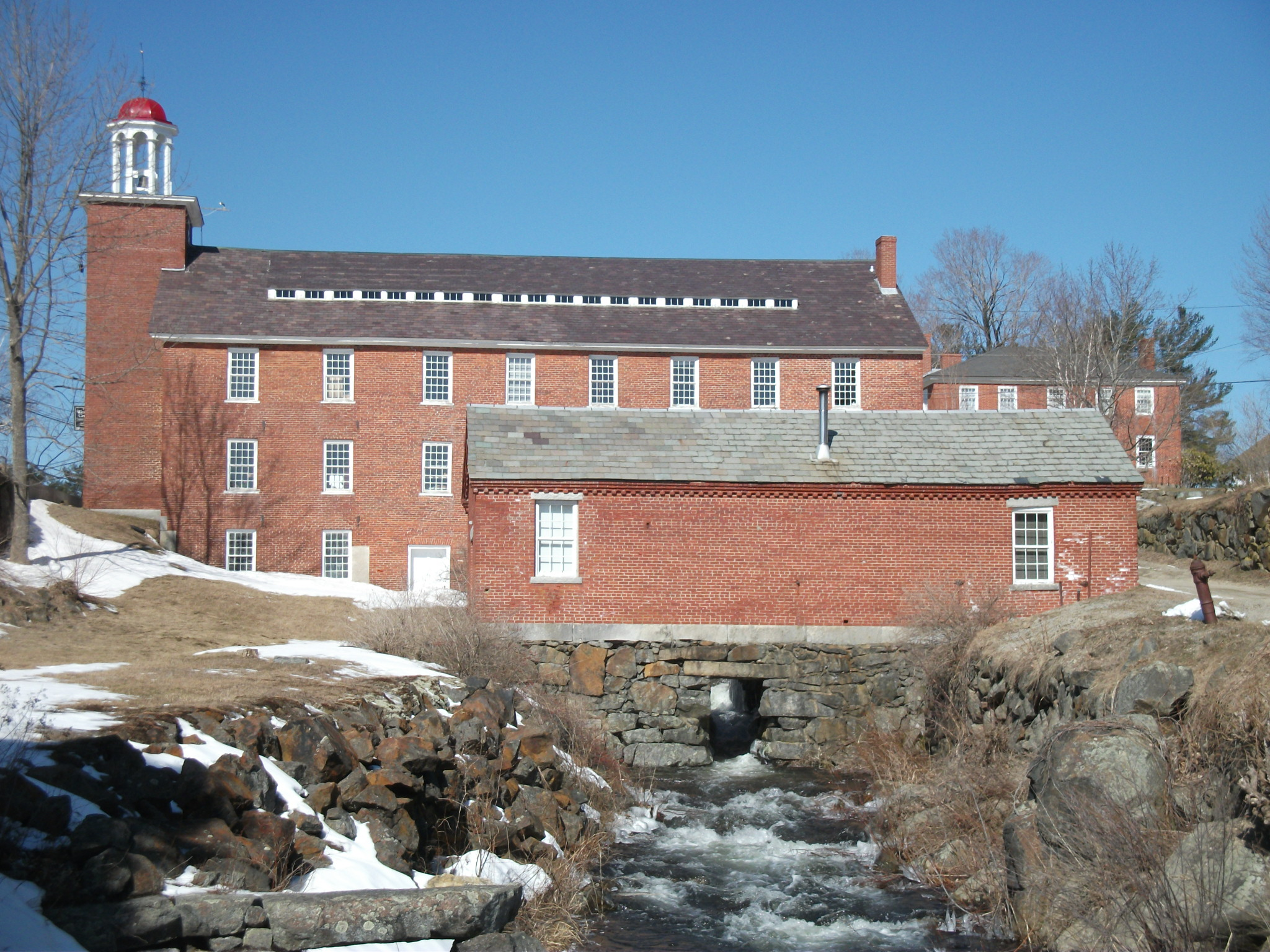
Harrisville, NH mill

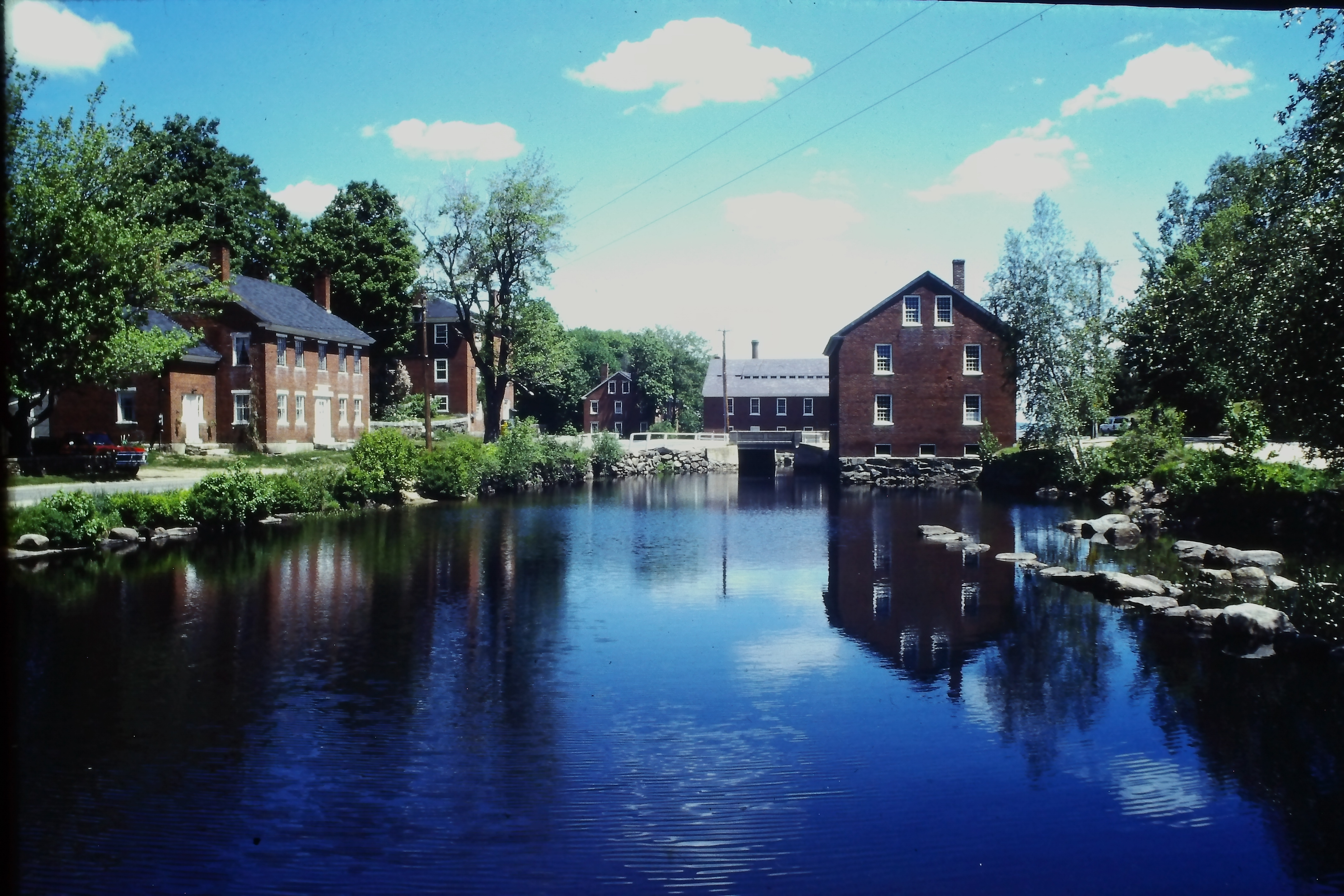
Harrisville, NH canal

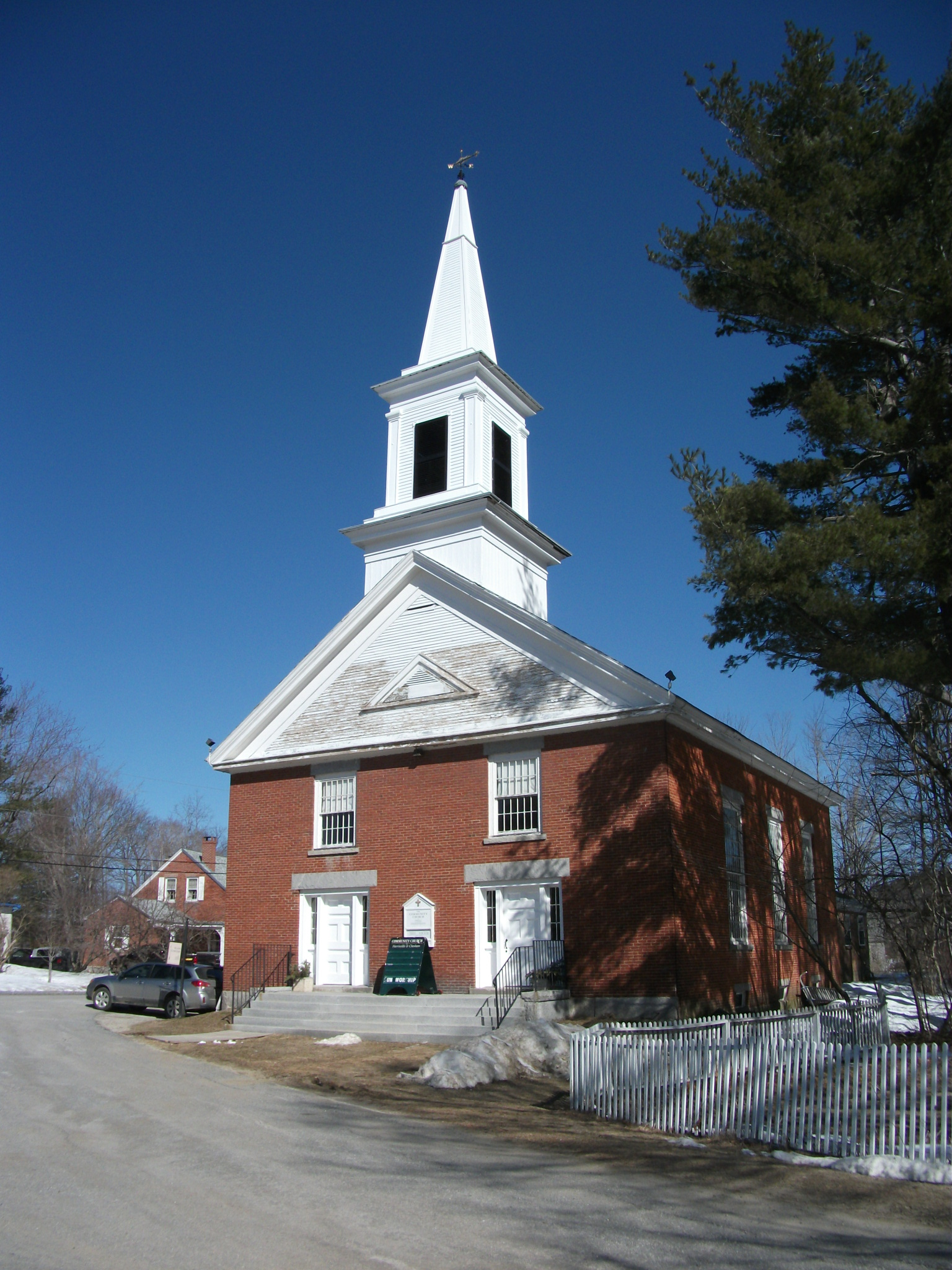
Community Church of Harrisville, NH

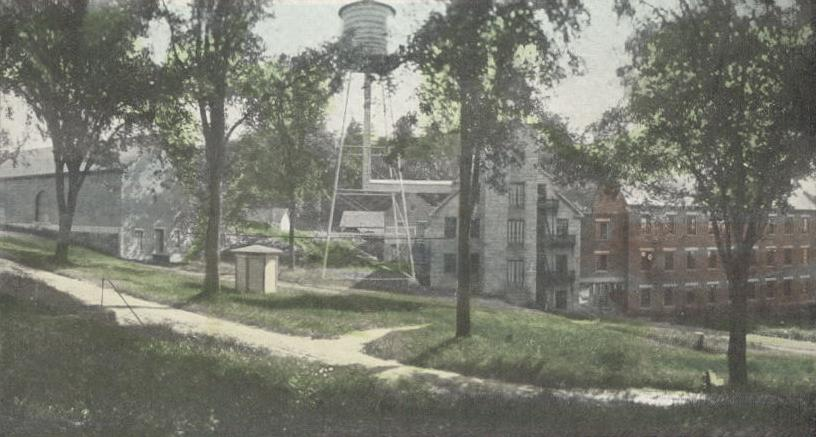
Cheshire Mills c. 1915

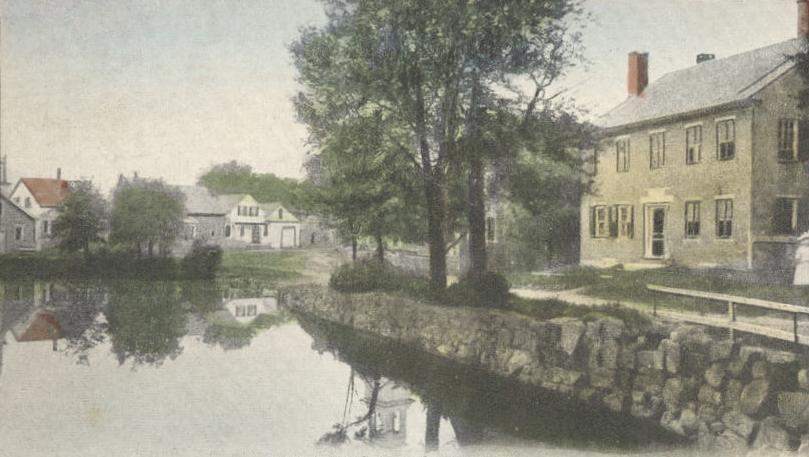
Looking up canal in 1914

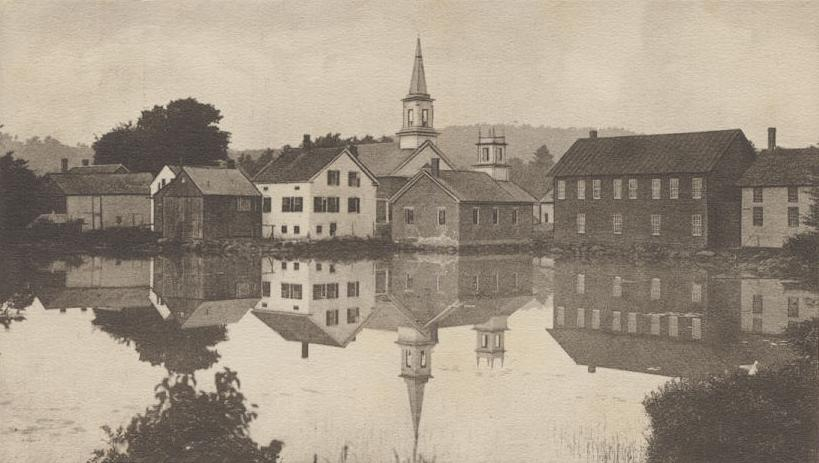
Town view c. 1905

== Geography ==
According to the United States Census Bureau, the town has a total area of 20.2 square miles (52.4 km^{2}), of which 18.6 square miles (48.3 km^{2}) are land and 1.6 square miles (4.1 km^{2}) are water, comprising 7.79% of the town. The highest point in Harrisville is the summit of Cobb Hill, at 1,909 feet (582 m) above sea level. Roughly the western half of Harrisville, drained by Minnewawa Brook, lies within the Ashuelot River watershed, part of the Connecticut River basin, while the eastern half, drained by Nubanusit Brook, is in the Contoocook River watershed, part of the Merrimack River basin.

=== Bodies of water ===
- Beaver Pond
- Chesham Pond
- Child's Bog
- Dinsmore Pond
- Harrisville Pond
- Howe Reservoir
- Russell Reservoir
- Seaver Reservoir
- Silver Lake
- Skatutakee Lake
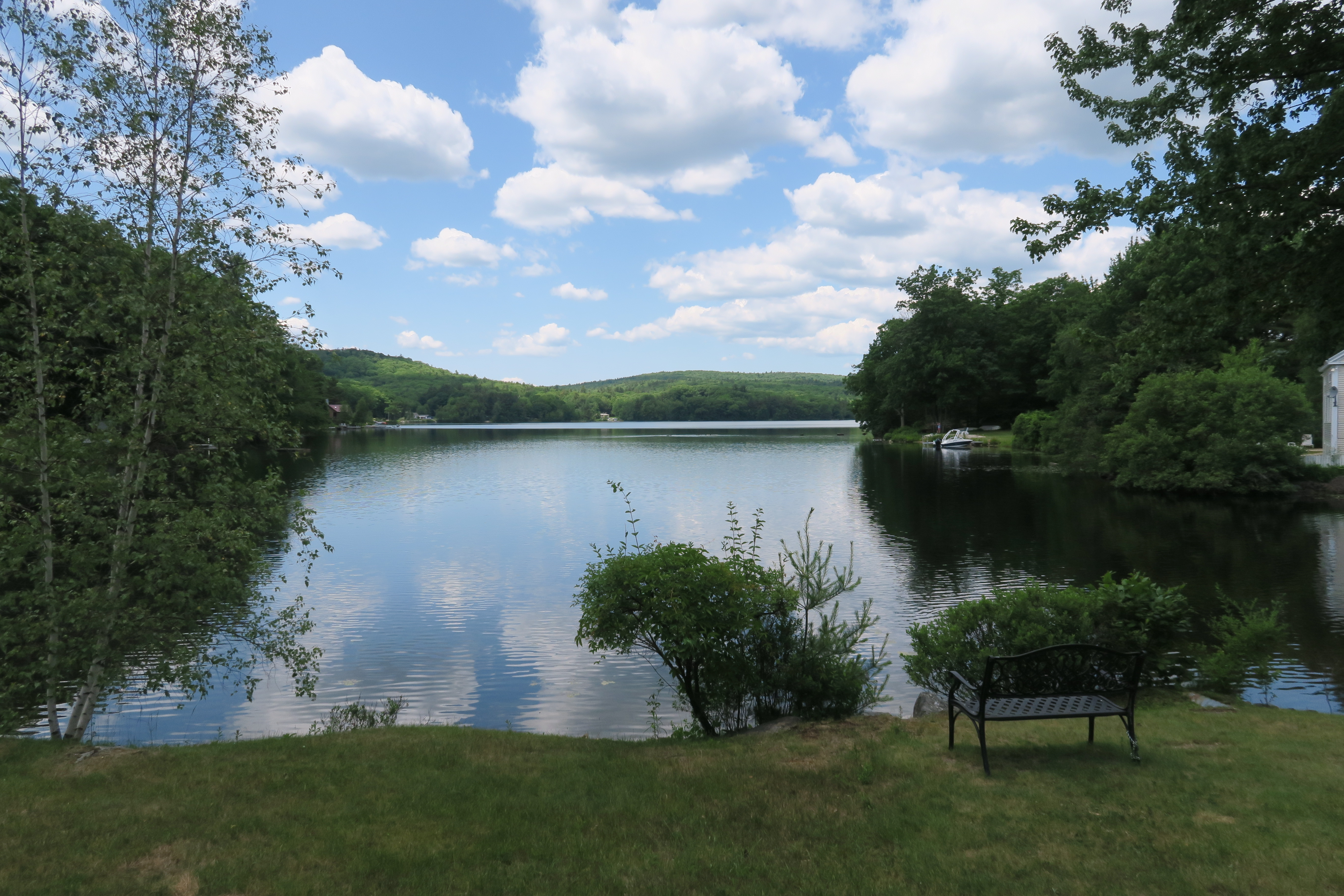
Harrisville Pond

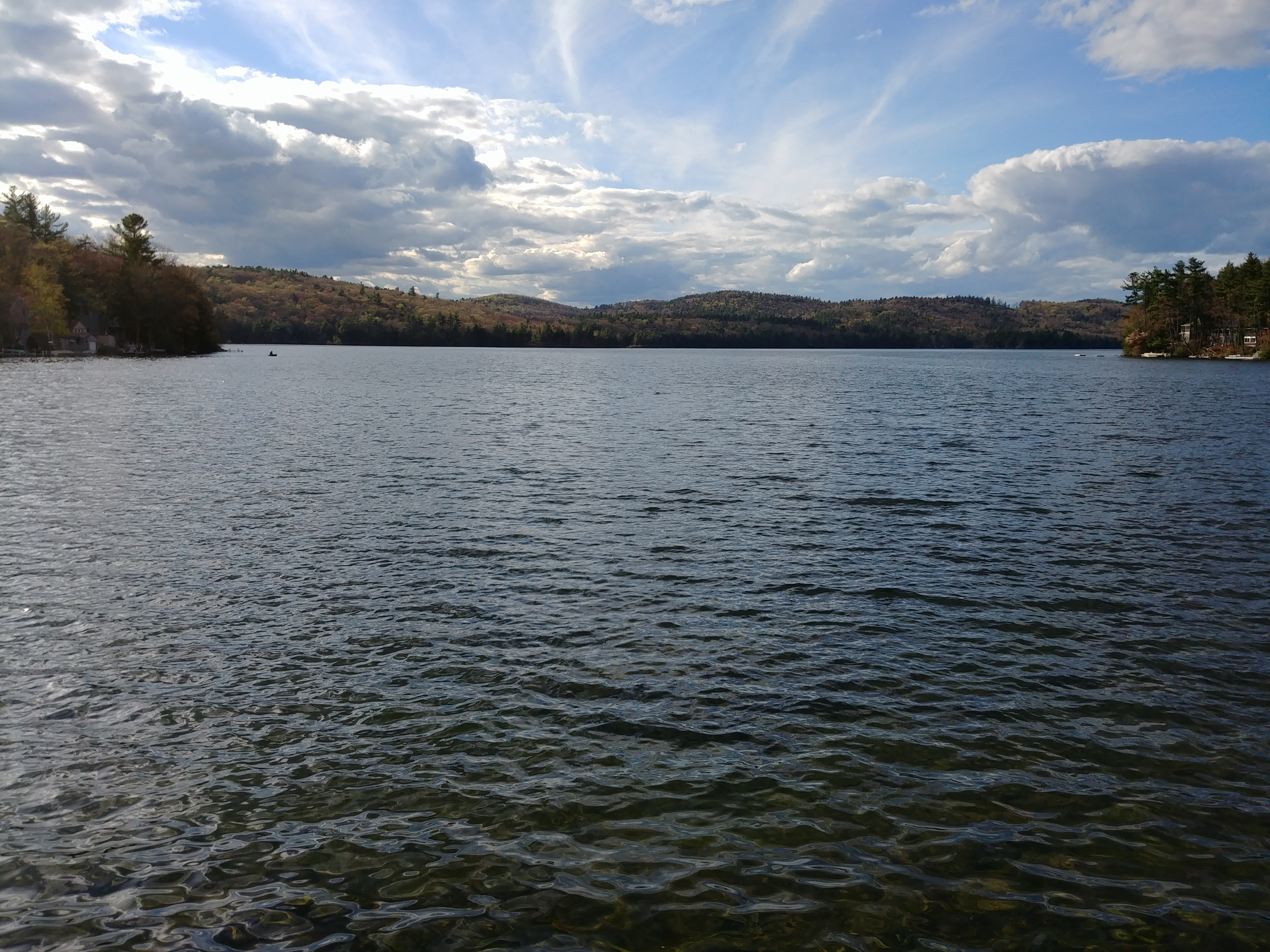
Silver Lake, Harrisville, NH

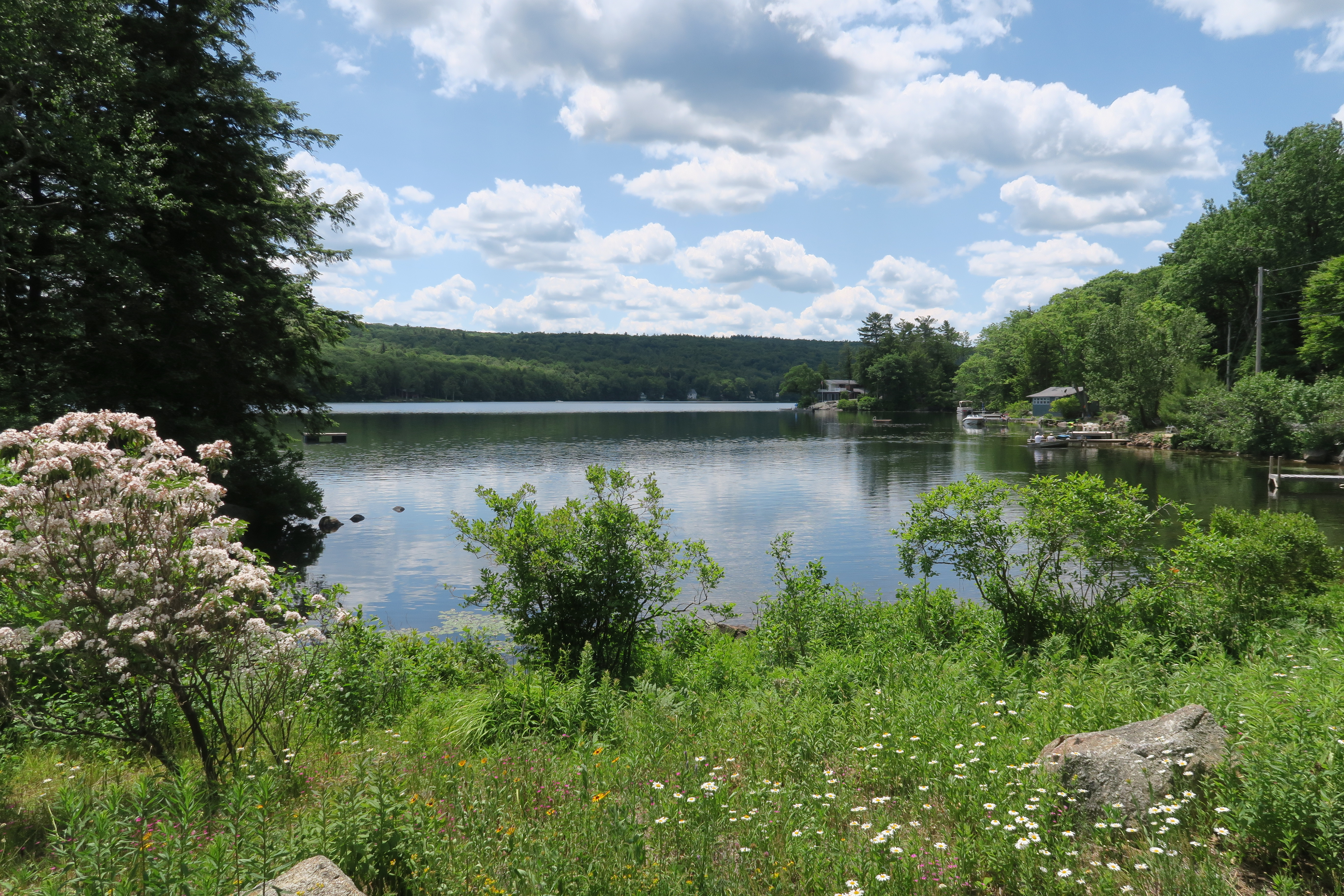
Skatutakee Lake

== Churches ==
The Community Church of Harrisville and Chesham was formed from Chesham Baptist Church and Harrisville Congregational Church. Chesham Baptist Church dates back to 1785. The church building was originally built in 1797, re-modeled in 1830, and again re-modeled in 1844. The Evangelical Congregational Church of Harrisville dates back to 1840, and the church building was erected in 1840–1843.

The Community Church is a member of the United Church of Christ (UCC) and the American Baptist Association, and it retains a united congregation using only the brick church in Harrisville village. The church in Chesham is now owned by Historic Harrisville Inc and is no longer used by the Community Church of Harrisville & Chesham.

Harrisville was home to St. Denis Parish of the Roman Catholic Church from 1902 to 2010, when services ended following the merger with Saint Peter Parish in Peterborough and Saint Patrick Parish in Bennington. The church building is owned by Historic Harrisville Inc and is now known as the Village Community Center or VCC.

== Demographics ==
Historical population
Census	Pop.	Note	%±
1880	870		—
1890	748		−14.0%
1900	791		5.7%
1910	623		−21.2%
1920	559		−10.3%
1930	512		−8.4%
1940	509		−0.6%
1950	519		2.0%
1960	459		−11.6%
1970	584		27.2%
1980	860		47.3%
1990	981		14.1%
2000	1,075		9.6%
2010	961		−10.6%
2020	984		2.4%
2024 (est.)	1,003		1.9%
U.S. Decennial Census

At the 2020 census, there were 984 people, 453 households residing in the town. The population density was 48.7 per square mile (18.8/km2). There were 680 housing units at an average density of 33.7 per square mile (13.0/km2). The racial make-up of the town was 94.3% White, 0.4 % African American, 0.1 % Native American, 0.9 % Asian, 0.7% Some other race and 3.6 % from two or more races. Hispanic or Latino of any race were 1.52 % of the population.

Of the 453 households, 17.9% had children under the age of 18 living with them, 55.6% were married couples living together, 23.2% had a female householder with no spouse present, 14.6% had a male householder with no spouse present, and 6.6% were cohabiting couples. 21.6% of all households were made up of individuals living alone and 51.0% of households included individuals who were 65 years of age or older. 15.0% of the population were under the age of 18, and 31.8% was over 65 years of age or older. The median age was 56.4 years. For every 100 females, there were 92.2 males. For every 100 females aged 18 and over, there were 89.6 males.

According to the 2024 American Community Survey, the median household incomewas $103,036 and the median family income was $121,765. Males had a median earnings of $61,488 and females $45,179. The per capita income was $67,042. About 3.6% of the population were below the poverty line, including 2.1% of those under age 18 and 3.2% of those age 65 or over.

== Education ==
The elementary school is Wells Memorial School. The town is part of School Administrative Unit 29.

=== Adjacent municipalities ===
- Nelson (north)
- Hancock (east)
- Peterborough (southeast)
- Dublin (south)
- Marlborough (southwest)
- Roxbury(west)
