= Contoocook River =

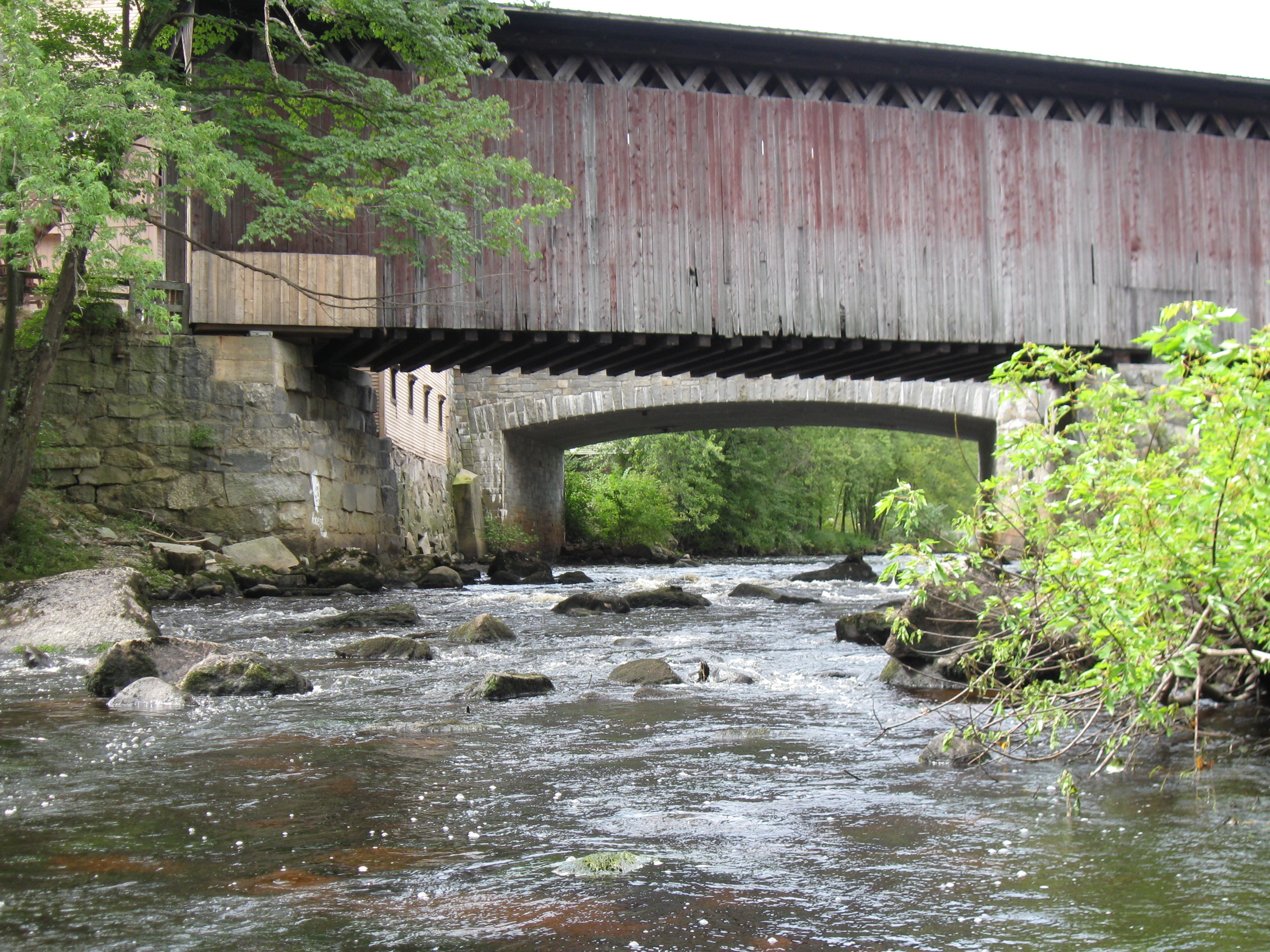
- Covered railroad bridge in village of Contoocook

- Location within New Hampshire Location within the United States

Location
- Country: United States
- State: New Hampshire
- Counties: Cheshire, Hillsborough, Merrimack
- Towns: Jaffrey, Peterborough, Bennington, Antrim, Hillsborough, Henniker, West Hopkinton, Contoocook, Penacook

Physical characteristics
- Source: Contoocook Lake
  - location: Jaffrey
  - coordinates: 42°48′4″N 72°1′38″W
  - elevation: 1,007 ft (307 m)
- Mouth: Merrimack River
  - location: Penacook
  - coordinates: 43°17′11″N 71°35′23″W
  - elevation: 242 ft (74 m)
- Length: 71 mi (114 km)

Basin features
- Tributaries
  - left: Nubanusit Brook, North Branch, Warner River, Blackwater River
  - right: Gridley River

The Contoocook River (/kənˈtʊkək/) is a 71-mile-long (114 km) river in New Hampshire. It flows from Contoocook Lake on the Jaffrey/Rindge border to Penacook (just north of Concord), where it empties into the Merrimack River. It is one of only a few rivers in New Hampshire that flow in a predominantly northward direction. Four covered bridges span the river, one in the town of Henniker, one on the Hancock-Greenfield line, and two in the town of Hopkinton, New Hampshire with one being in the village of Contoocook, and the other in the populated place of West Hopkinton. Residents and tourists have made the Contoocook popular for fishing and whitewater boating.

The name Contoocook came from the Pennacook tribe of Native Americans and perhaps means "place of the river near pines". Other variations of the name include the Abenaki meaning "nut trees river" or Natick language meaning "small plantation at the river."

The river gives its name to Contoocook, New Hampshire, a census-designated place (CDP) within the town of Hopkinton.

== Principal tributaries ==
From south to north:

- Nubanusit Brook begins at Nubanusit Lake in Nelson and joins the Contoocook in Peterborough.
- The North Branch of the Contoocook starts in Stoddard and joins the main stem in Hillsborough.
- The Warner River starts in Bradford and joins the Contoocook in Hopkinton.
- The Blackwater River begins at Pleasant Lake in New London and joins the Contoocook in Hopkinton.

== See also ==
- List of New Hampshire rivers
