= George Cheever Farm =

Historic house in New Hampshire, United States

- U.S. National Register of Historic Places
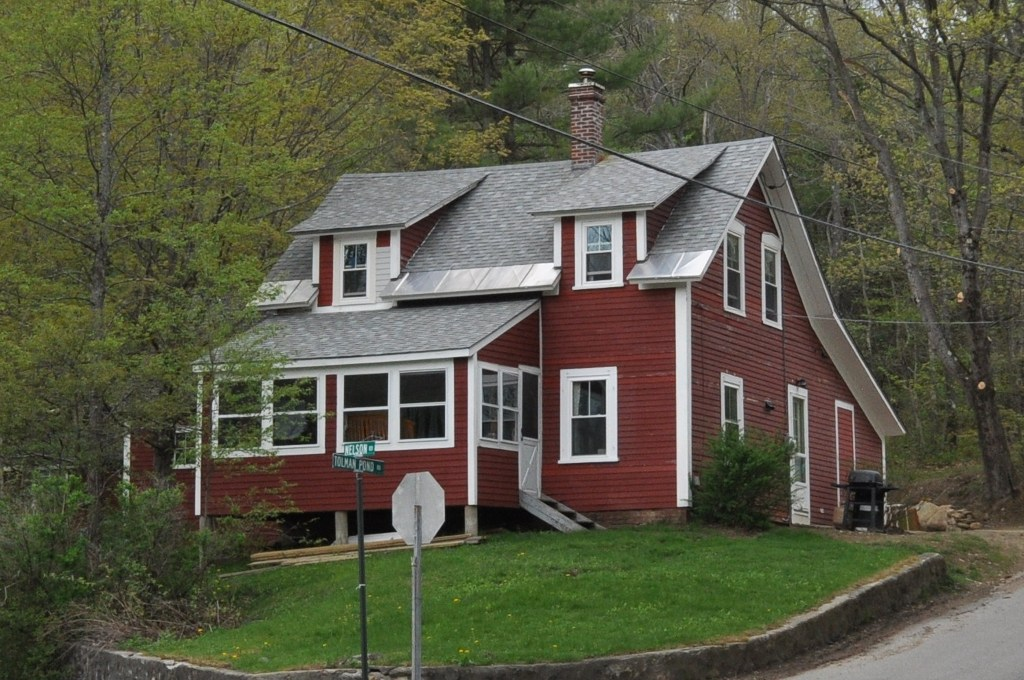

- Location within New Hampshire Location within the United States
- Location: Intersection of Nelson and Tolman Pond Rds., Harrisville, New Hampshire
- Coordinates: 42°57′19″N 72°7′15″W
- Area: 0.4 acres (0.16 ha)
- Built: 1860
- MPS: Harrisville MRA
- NRHP reference No.: 86003238
- Added to NRHP: January 14, 1988

The George Cheever Farm is a historic farmstead at the corner of Nelson and Tolman Pond Roads in Harrisville, New Hampshire. This 1½-story wood-frame house was built in the early 1860s, and is a well-preserved example of a period farmhouse. It is architecturally distinctive because of a rear saltbox style addition, and its shed-roof dormers. The house was listed on the National Register of Historic Places in 1988.

== Description and history ==
The George Cheever Farm is located in a rural setting northwest of the village center of Harrisville, standing on a knoll close to the V-shaped junction of Nelson and Tolman Pond Roads. It is a 1½-story wood-frame structure, with a gabled roof and clapboarded exterior. Its main facade is three bays wide, with the left two obscured by an enclosed shed-roof porch. The front roof face is pierced by two shed-roof dormers, and the rear is extended by a saltbox-style ell, whose roof is at a lower pitch than the main roof. A single-story ell extends to the left side of the main block. The exterior styling of the house is vernacular, with simple corner boards and window surrounds.

The house was built sometime between 1860 and 1863 by George Cheever, a farmer. The house is one of a modest number of mid-19th-century farmhouses surviving in the town, and bears some resemblance to the slightly earlier Jabez Townsend House.

== See also ==
- National Register of Historic Places listings in Cheshire County, New Hampshire
