= Nelson Schoolhouse =

- U.S. National Register of Historic Places
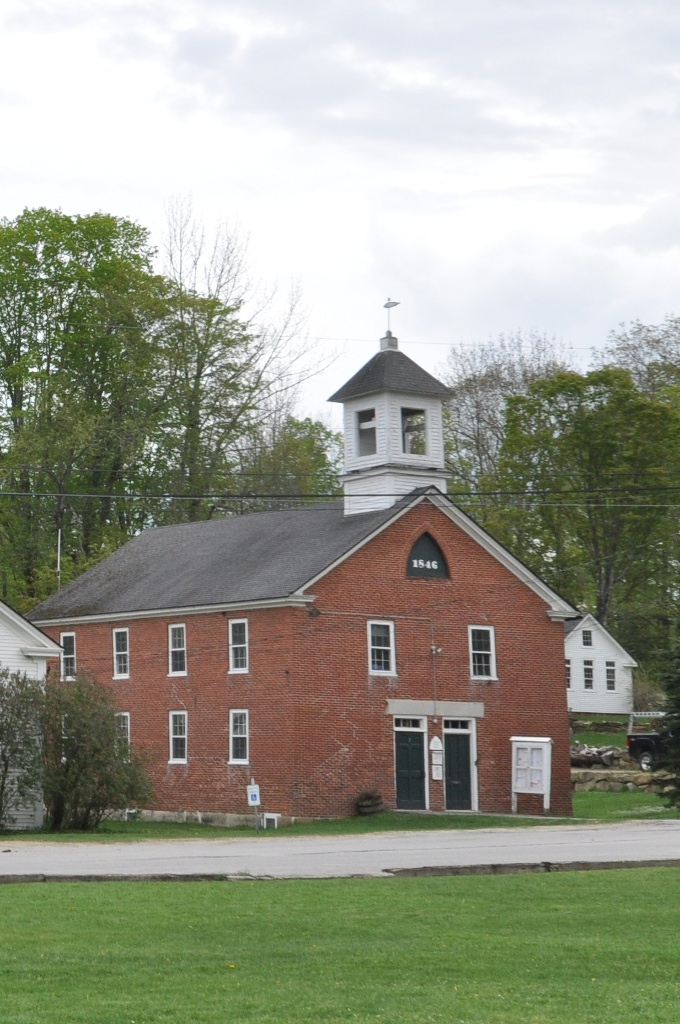

- Location within New Hampshire Location within the United States
- Location: 7 Nelson Common Road, Nelson, New Hampshire
- Coordinates: 42°59′21″N 72°7′42″W
- Area: 0.5 acres (0.20 ha)
- Built: 1838
- NRHP reference No.: 73000251
- Added to NRHP: April 23, 1973

The Nelson Schoolhouse is a historic school building at 7 Nelson Common Road in Nelson, New Hampshire, United States. Built in 1838 as a district schoolhouse, it served as a school and community function space for many years, and now houses town offices. The building was listed on the National Register of Historic Places in 1973.

== Description and history ==
The Nelson Schoolhouse is located in the village center of the town, on the east side of its green just south of the library. The building is a 2 1/2-story structure, built of red brick laid in stretcher bond. It has a pair of doorways in the main facade, each topped by a four-light transom window, with a single long granite lintel stone above both entrances. There are two sash windows on the second level, offset from the doorways toward the sides of the building, and there is a centered pointed-arch window near the point of the gable. The building is topped by a small wooden tower with an open belfry and a shallow-pitch pyramidal roof.

It was built in 1838, its first floor funded by the citizens of the town's #1 school district in part through district levies and its second by subscription. The belfry was paid for by another subscription. The ground floor was used for classes, and the second floor was a large space usable for public functions. The building was used as a school and function space until 1945, when it was the last of Nelson's schools to close.

== See also ==
- National Register of Historic Places listings in Cheshire County, New Hampshire
