= William Strongman House =

Historic house in New Hampshire, United States

- U.S. National Register of Historic Places
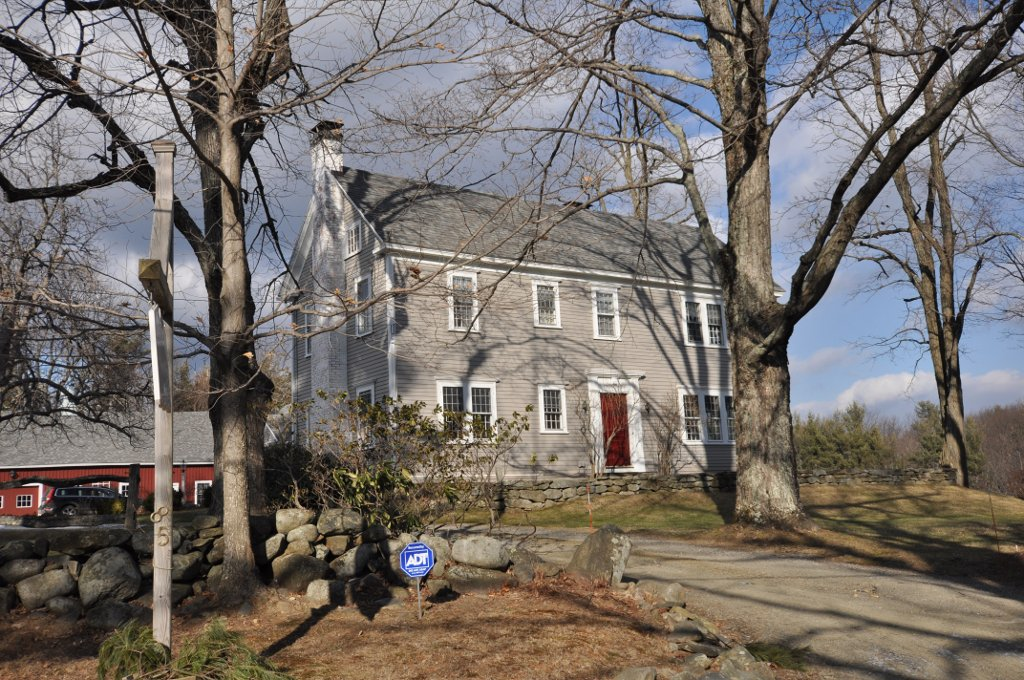

- Location within New Hampshire Location within the United States
- Location: 85 Old County Rd., Dublin, New Hampshire
- Coordinates: 42°54′19″N 72°2′20″W
- Area: 3 acres (1.2 ha)
- Built: 1780
- Architectural style: Colonial Revival, Colonial
- MPS: Dublin MRA
- NRHP reference No.: 83004083
- Added to NRHP: December 18, 1983

The William Strongman House is a historic house at 85 Old County Road in Dublin, New Hampshire. The oldest portion of this house is its northern ell, a 1 1/2-story structure built in the late 18th century by William Strongman, son of Henry Strongman, who was Dublin's first settler. The main block of the house, a 2 1/2-story wood-frame Colonial Revival structure, was built by William Wyman in 1899 to resemble typical late 17th-century houses. The house was listed on the National Register of Historic Places in 1983.

== Description and history ==
The William Strongman House is located in eastern Dublin, on the north side of Old County Road (a former alignment of the main road between Dublin village and Peterborough). Its main block is a 2 1/2-story wood-frame structure, with a gabled roof, end chimney, and clapboarded exterior. Its main facade is four bays wide, with an irregular assortment of single, double, and tripled bands of sash windows arranged around a roughly centered entrance. The windows are topped by projecting cornices, and the entry is framed by pilasters and a corniced entablature. A long single-story ell extends to the rear at right angles to the main block.

The ell of the house was built in the late 18th century by William Strongman, who settled this land in 1772. The main block, built in 1899, is Dublin's only Colonial Revival house based on 17th-century colonial architecture. One of its more notable summer occupants was philosopher Irving Babbitt.

== See also ==
- National Register of Historic Places listings in Cheshire County, New Hampshire
