= Smith–Mason Farm =

Historic house in New Hampshire, United States

- U.S. National Register of Historic Places
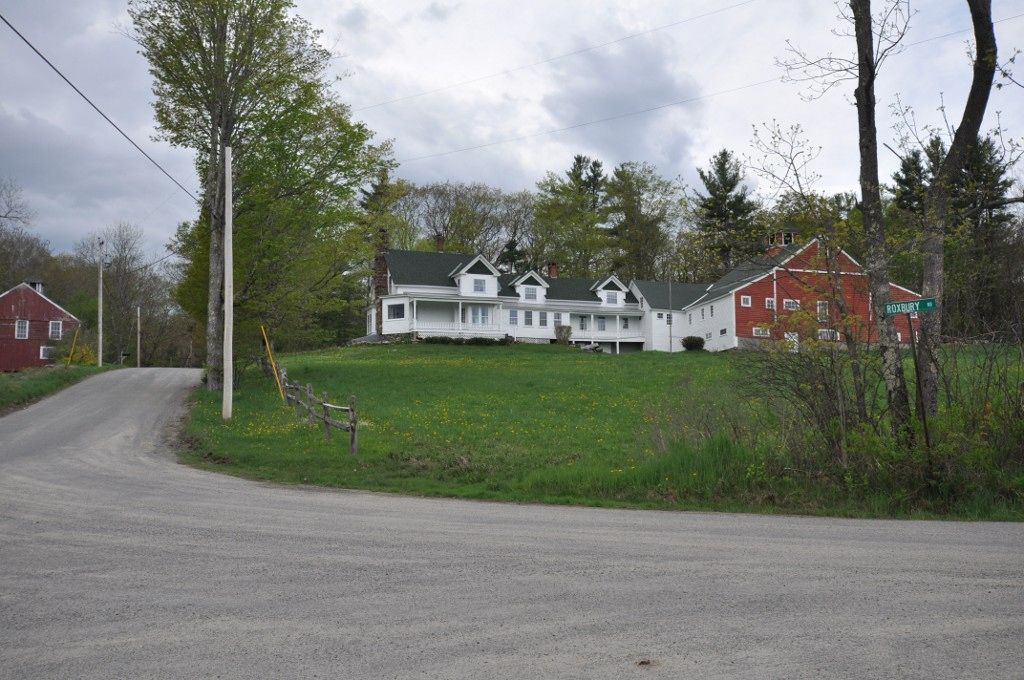

- Location within New Hampshire Location within the United States
- Location: NW of Meadow and Old Roxbury Rds. intersection, Harrisville, New Hampshire
- Coordinates: 42°55′52″N 72°9′25″W
- Area: 4.6 acres (1.9 ha)
- Built: 1791
- MPS: Harrisville MRA
- NRHP reference No.: 86003255
- Added to NRHP: January 14, 1988

The Smith–Mason Farm is a historic farmstead at Meadow Road and Old Roxbury Road in Harrisville, New Hampshire. First developed in the late 18th century, the property has been adaptively used as a farm, summer estate, and family residence, representing major periods in Harrisville's development. The property was listed on the National Register of Historic Places in 1988.

== Description and history ==
The Smith–Mason Farm is located in a rural setting in western Harrisville, just northwest of the junction of Meadow and Old Roxbury roads. The farmstead is a rambling 1 1/2-story frame structure, with multiple sections and additions. The main house is a 1 1/2-story Greek Revival structure, and it is attached to a shed and barn, making a traditional New England house-to-barn complex. A second detached barn stands across Old Roxbury Road, and a modest cottage is located near the main complex.

The property exemplifies the transitions of use in rural Harrisville, starting as a working farm established by Abner Smith in 1791; it is believed that one of the ells of the house may be his original house. It was converted into a summer residence in 1904 by Sara Coe of New York City, who added porches and roof dormers to the house, and dubbed the property "Brookside". It was converted back to full-time occupancy later in the 20th century.

== See also ==
- National Register of Historic Places listings in Cheshire County, New Hampshire
