= Spur House =

Historic house in New Hampshire, United States

- U.S. National Register of Historic Places
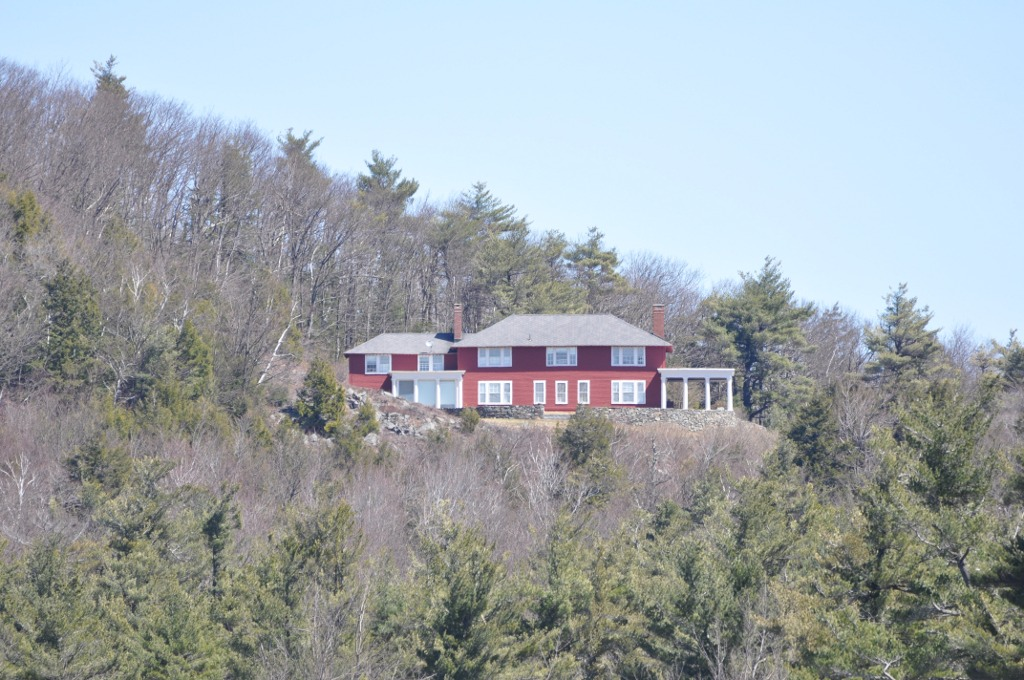

- Location within New Hampshire Location within the United States
- Location: Off Old Common Rd., Dublin, New Hampshire
- Coordinates: 42°54′32″N 72°4′5″W
- Area: 2 acres (0.81 ha)
- Built: 1901
- Architect: Platt, Charles A.; Patterson, Herbert
- Architectural style: Colonial Revival
- MPS: Dublin MRA
- NRHP reference No.: 83004075
- Added to NRHP: December 15, 1983

The Spur House is a historic house off Old Common Road in Dublin, New Hampshire. Built in 1901, it is a good local example of Colonial Revival architecture, designed by architect Charles A. Platt. The house was listed on the National Register of Historic Places in 1983.

== Description and history ==
The Spur House is sited on the spur of Beech Hill, overlooking Dublin Pond, and is accessed via a winding drive off Old Common Road. It is a two-story wood-frame structure, with a hip roof and clapboarded exterior. Its main facade is five bays wide, with symmetrically placed but differently sized windows placed around the main entrance. The entrance is framed by a gabled surround, and one of the upper windows has a rounded top, corresponding in placement to the stairwell inside. The east end of the building has an open porch with pergola, while the west end has a later 20th-century addition and enclosed porch.

The house was designed by Charles A. Platt and built in 1901. It was commissioned by Platt's sister, Mrs. Francis Jencks, for her sister-in-law's family. The Jencks mansion, Beech Hill, is further up the hill, and was also designed by Platt. The two buildings are among a small number of Dublin summer properties attributed to Platt.

== See also ==
- National Register of Historic Places listings in Cheshire County, New Hampshire
