= Far Horizons (Dublin, New Hampshire) =

Historic house in New Hampshire, United States

- U.S. National Register of Historic Places
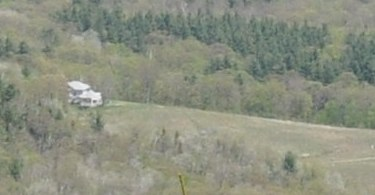
- The house as seen from Mount Monadnock

- Location within New Hampshire Location within the United States
- Location: Learned Rd., Dublin, New Hampshire
- Coordinates: 42°52′48″N 72°4′23″W
- Area: 1.4 acres (0.57 ha)
- Built: 1898–99
- Architectural style: Queen Anne
- MPS: Dublin MRA
- NRHP reference No.: 83004023
- Added to NRHP: December 15, 1983

Far Horizons is a historic house located on Learned Road in Dublin, New Hampshire. Completed in 1899, it is a distinctive local example of Queen Anne architecture, and was home for a time to physicist Robert Kraichnan. The house was added to the National Register of Historic Places on December 15, 1983.

== Description and history ==
Far Horizons is located in central southern Dublin, high on the eastern flank of Mount Monadnock, at the end of a long drive up the mountainside from Learned Road. At an elevation of about 1,800 feet (550 m), it is one of the highest in the town. It is a 2 1/2-story wood-frame house, with a hipped roof and exterior finished in board siding. The Queen Anne house features an octagonal turret on one of its front corners, and verandahs on two sides. A gabled dormer projects from one face above the verandah. A single-story gabled ell extends to the north, and a two-car garage and former carriage house stand nearby.

Henry Dwight Learned built the house as a seasonal residence on his family's farm in 1898–99. Learned was prominent in local affairs, and served as a state senator. Physicist Robert Kraichnan was one of its 20th-century owners; Kraichnan put an addition on the house in 1968, and adapted it for year-round occupation.

== See also ==
- National Register of Historic Places listings in Cheshire County, New Hampshire
