= Burpee Farm =

Historic house in New Hampshire, United States

- U.S. National Register of Historic Places
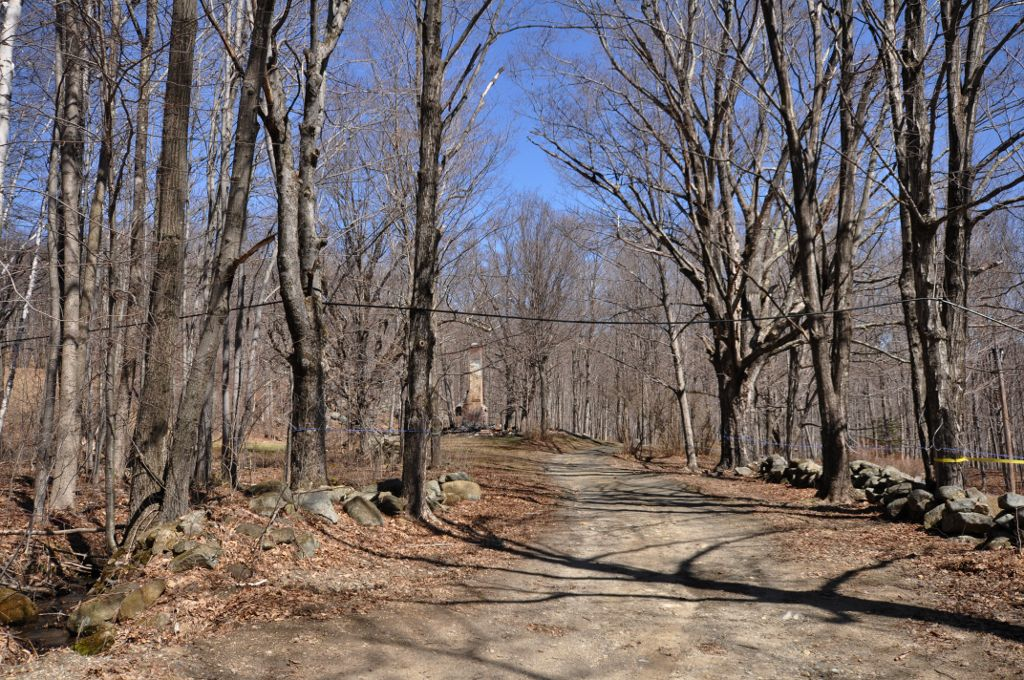
- Only the chimney remains.

- Location within New Hampshire Location within the United States
- Location: Burpee Rd., Dublin, New Hampshire
- Coordinates: 42°52′19″N 72°4′15″W
- Area: 0.4 acres (0.16 ha)
- Built: 1793
- Built by: Snow, Samuel
- Architectural style: Cape Cottage
- MPS: Dublin MRA
- NRHP reference No.: 83004014
- Added to NRHP: December 18, 1983

Burpee Farm was a historic farmhouse on Burpee Road in Dublin, New Hampshire, United States. Probably built in 1793, it was a good example of 18th-century vernacular farmhouse architecture, and was one of the town's oldest buildings. It was listed on the National Register of Historic Places in 1983, and was destroyed by fire in 2013.

== Description and history ==
The Burpee Farm farmhouse was located in a remote rural setting of southern Dublin, on the north side of Burpee Road, a dead-end lane extending up the eastern slope of Mount Monadnock to the Eveleth Farm. It was a modest 1 1/2-story wood-frame structure, with a gabled roof, central chimney, and clapboarded exterior. Its main facade was four bays wide, with an asymmetrical arrangement of three windows around an entrance that is slightly off-center. The door and windows were all set with their tops butting against the roof eave. The interior included exposed post-and-beam construction timbers, and the chimney included a beehive oven.

The house was probably built by Samuel Snow, one of Dublin's early settlers, who purchased 70 acres (28 ha) of land here in 1793 and probably built this house soon afterward. It was purchased in 1853 by Abbott Bowman Burpee, and remained in that family for over a century. The building was, despite some early 20th-century alterations, a well-preserved example of 18th century vernacular farmhouse architecture, and was one of Dublin's oldest buildings. It was purchased by the Swanson family in 1969, and was occupied by rental tenants when it was destroyed by a fire of unknown origin in 2013.

== See also ==
- National Register of Historic Places listings in Cheshire County, New Hampshire
