= Colony's Block =

- U.S. National Register of Historic Places
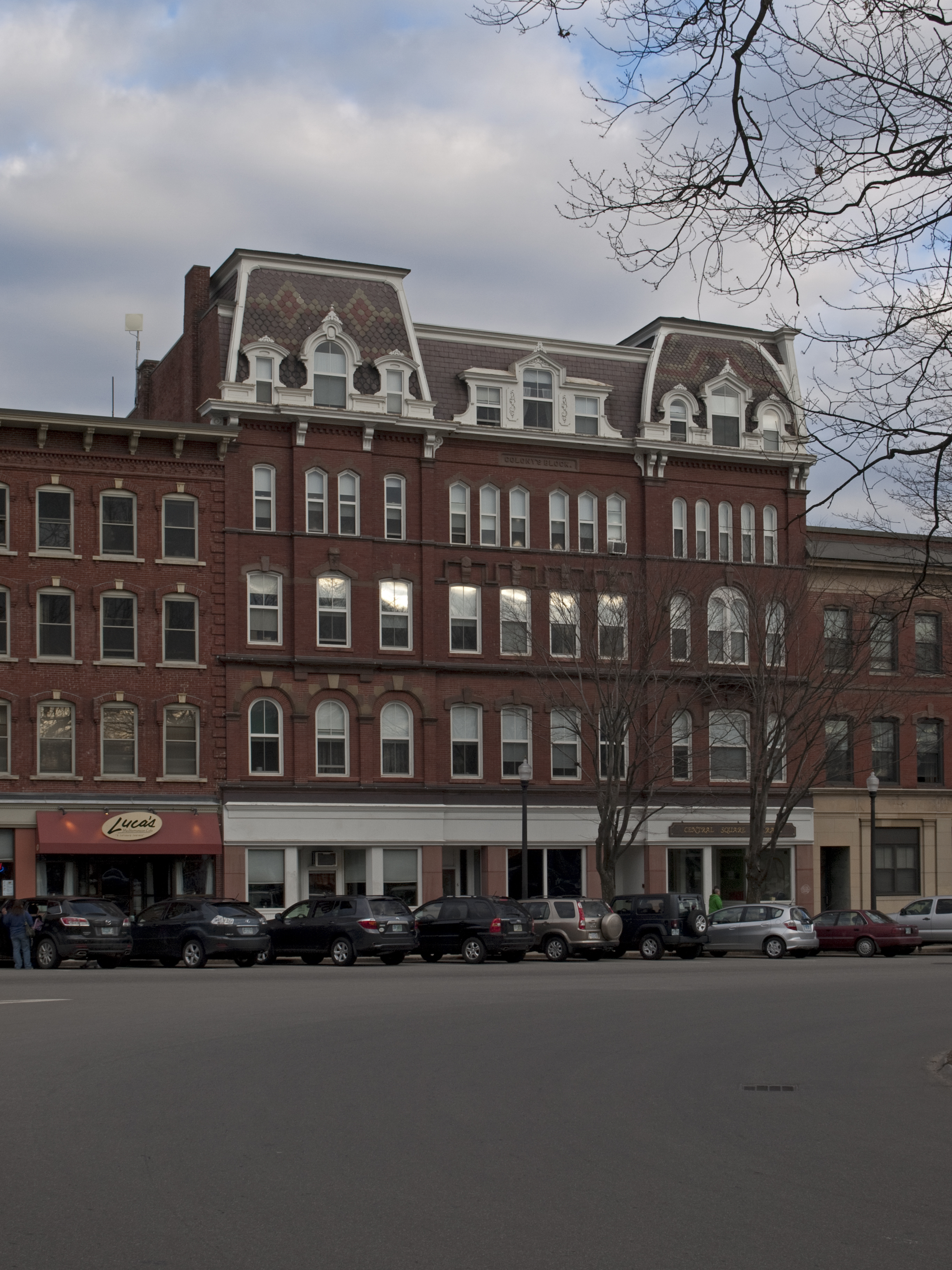

- Location within New Hampshire Location within the United States
- Location: 4-7 Central Square, Keene, New Hampshire
- Coordinates: 42°56′2″N 72°16′39″W
- Area: 0.2 acres (0.081 ha)
- Built: 1870
- Built by: J. M. Buzzell
- Architect: E. Boyden & Son
- Architectural style: Second Empire
- NRHP reference No.: 83001134
- Added to NRHP: March 24, 1983

Colony's Block is a historic commercial building at 4-7 Central Square in the heart of Keene, New Hampshire. The five-story brick building was built in 1870 to a design by Worcester, Massachusetts, architects E. Boyden & Son, and is the city's most prominent example of Second Empire architecture. In addition to being a long-standing commercial center, the building housed the city library from 1870 to 1877. The building was listed on the National Register of Historic Places in 1983.

== Description and history ==
Colony's Block is located in the heart of Keene, on the east side of its Central Square. It is a broad brick structure, nine bays wide, with four full stories, and a fifth under its mansard roof. The ground floor consists of three modernized storefronts, each with a recessed entrance and large display windows. The main entrance is located in a recess to the right of the center storefront. The upper levels bays are divided into 3-4-3 groupings, highlighted by the Chateau-style caps of the outer groups. The window arrangements and treatments are slightly asymmetrical, with second-floor windows in the left group set in rounded-arch openings, and Palladian-style arrangements of windows on the second and third levels of the right group. Dormer treatments in the mansard roof are also nearly symmetrical, differing in the shaping of decorative elements.

The building was constructed in 1870, in the aftermath of a fire which destroyed the commercial buildings on this side of the square in 1865. It was built by Timothy Colony, treasurer of the Cheshire Mills of Harrisville and a prominent local businessman. Early tenants included the public library on the second floor, and a drugstore on the first that remained in operation into the 1980s. The building was designed by Elbridge Boyden of Worcester, Massachusetts, who had executed other commissions in Keene prior to this work.

The building was built together with the Bank Block, located to its right. Also designed by Boyden, it and the Colony were meant to be seen as a single structure. The Bank Block was altered in the 20th century, attaining a more Colonial Revival appearance.

== See also ==
- National Register of Historic Places listings in Cheshire County, New Hampshire
