= Richmond School House No. 6 =

- U.S. National Register of Historic Places
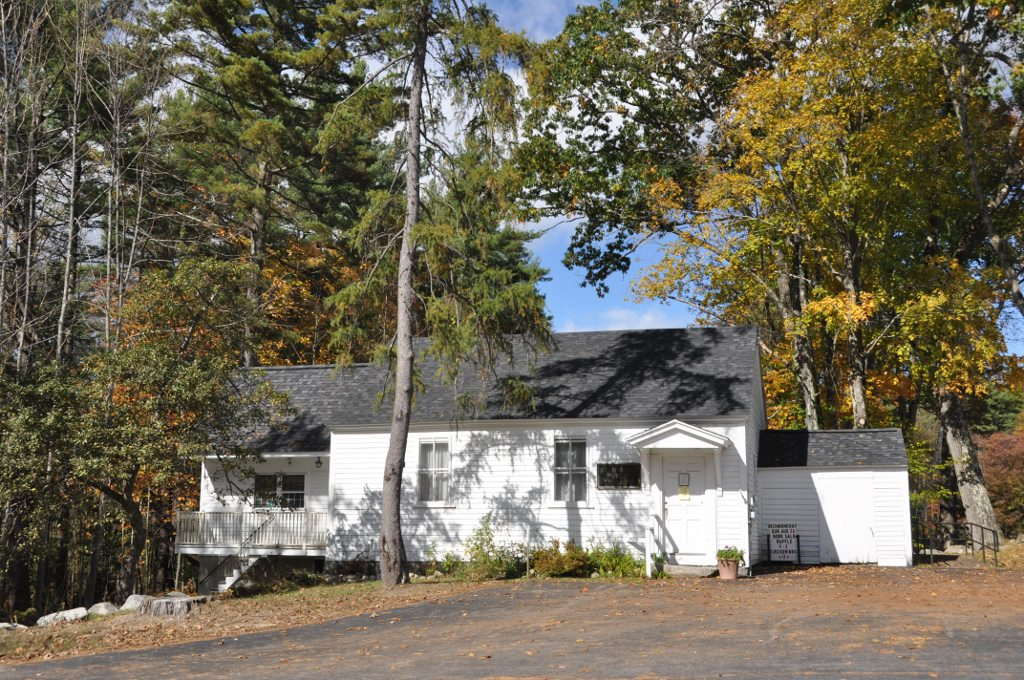

- Location within New Hampshire Location within the United States
- Location: 19 Winchester Rd. (NH 119), Richmond, New Hampshire
- Coordinates: 42°45′19″N 72°16′27″W
- Area: 1 acre (0.40 ha)
- Built: 1850
- NRHP reference No.: 80000279
- Added to NRHP: November 25, 1980

The Richmond Public Library is the public library of Richmond, New Hampshire, United States. It is located in the Richmond School House No. 6 at 19 Winchester Road (New Hampshire Route 119) in the village center. Built in 1850, the building is the best-preserved of the town's few surviving district schoolhouses. It was listed on the National Register of Historic Places in 1980.

== Description and history ==
The Richmond Public Library stands on the west side of the small village center of Richmond, on the north side of Winchester Road west of Old Homestead Road. It is a single-story wood-frame structure, with a gabled roof and clapboarded exterior. Its main facade is three bays wide, with sash windows in the left two bays, and the main entrance in the right one, sheltered by a gabled hood with large decoratively cut supporting brackets. A small ell extends to the right, and a larger one to the left, both the result of 20th-century alterations. The interior has been completely refurbished for library use, with pine paneling, dropped ceilings, and built-in shelving.

The school was the second to be built on the site, the first being a brick building which burned in 1850. This building was constructed later the same year, and served as a school until 1947. It was converted to library use in 1962. Alterations at that time and in 1974 included the removal of a belfry, the addition of an extension to the west (which included a below-grade fireproof vault for archives), and of the pedimented entrance cover.

== See also ==
- National Register of Historic Places listings in Cheshire County, New Hampshire
