= Clymer House =

Historic house in New Hampshire, United States

- U.S. National Register of Historic Places
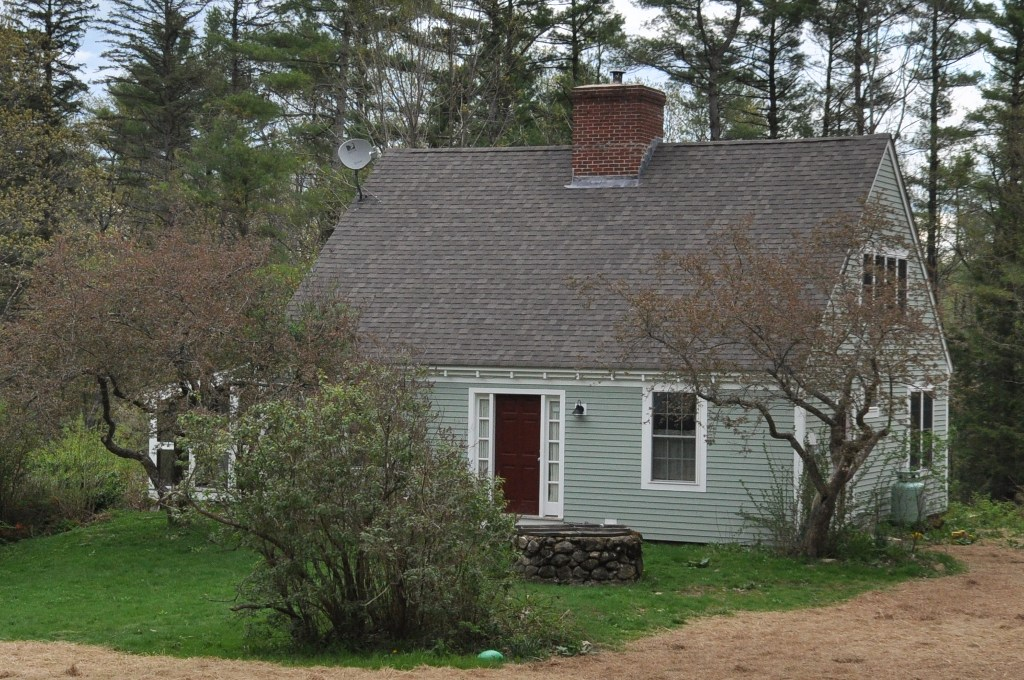

- Location within New Hampshire Location within the United States
- Location: 31 Clymer Road, Harrisville, New Hampshire
- Coordinates: 42°57′38″N 72°6′19″W
- Area: 1.5 acres (0.61 ha)
- Built: 1932
- Architectural style: Colonial Revival
- MPS: Harrisville MRA
- NRHP reference No.: 86003239
- Added to NRHP: January 14, 1988

The Clymer House is a historic house at 31 Clymer Road in Harrisville, New Hampshire. Constructed in 1932, it is a finely crafted example of Colonial Revival architecture, built in conscious imitation of an earlier form that might have occupied the same site. The house was listed on the National Register of Historic Places in 1988.

== Description and history ==
The Clymer House is located in a rural setting north of the village center of Harrisville, on the north side of Clymer Road, a short stub road extending east from Tolman Pond Road. It is a 1 1/2-story wood-frame structure, with a gabled roof, central chimney, and clapboarded exterior. It is set on the stone foundation of an older house. The main facade is three bays wide, and faces west, toward a central barnyard surrounded by a cluster of outbuildings. It has sash windows on either side of a center entrance, which is flanked by sidelight windows. The door and windows both butt against the roof eave, a clear echo of how these types of houses were built in the 18th century. The interior is little altered since its construction, and includes a fireplace with paneled surround.

The house was built in 1932, and is a rare local example of a well-preserved Colonial Revival cottage. The accompanying barn is also from that period, and is like the house built on an old foundation. Other period elements of the property include a garage with batten siding and a small guesthouse. The entire complex has the feel of a traditional 18th-century hill farm, original examples of which are still found in the town.

== See also ==
- National Register of Historic Places listings in Cheshire County, New Hampshire
