= Beaver Mills (Keene, New Hampshire) =

- U.S. National Register of Historic Places
- U.S. Historic district
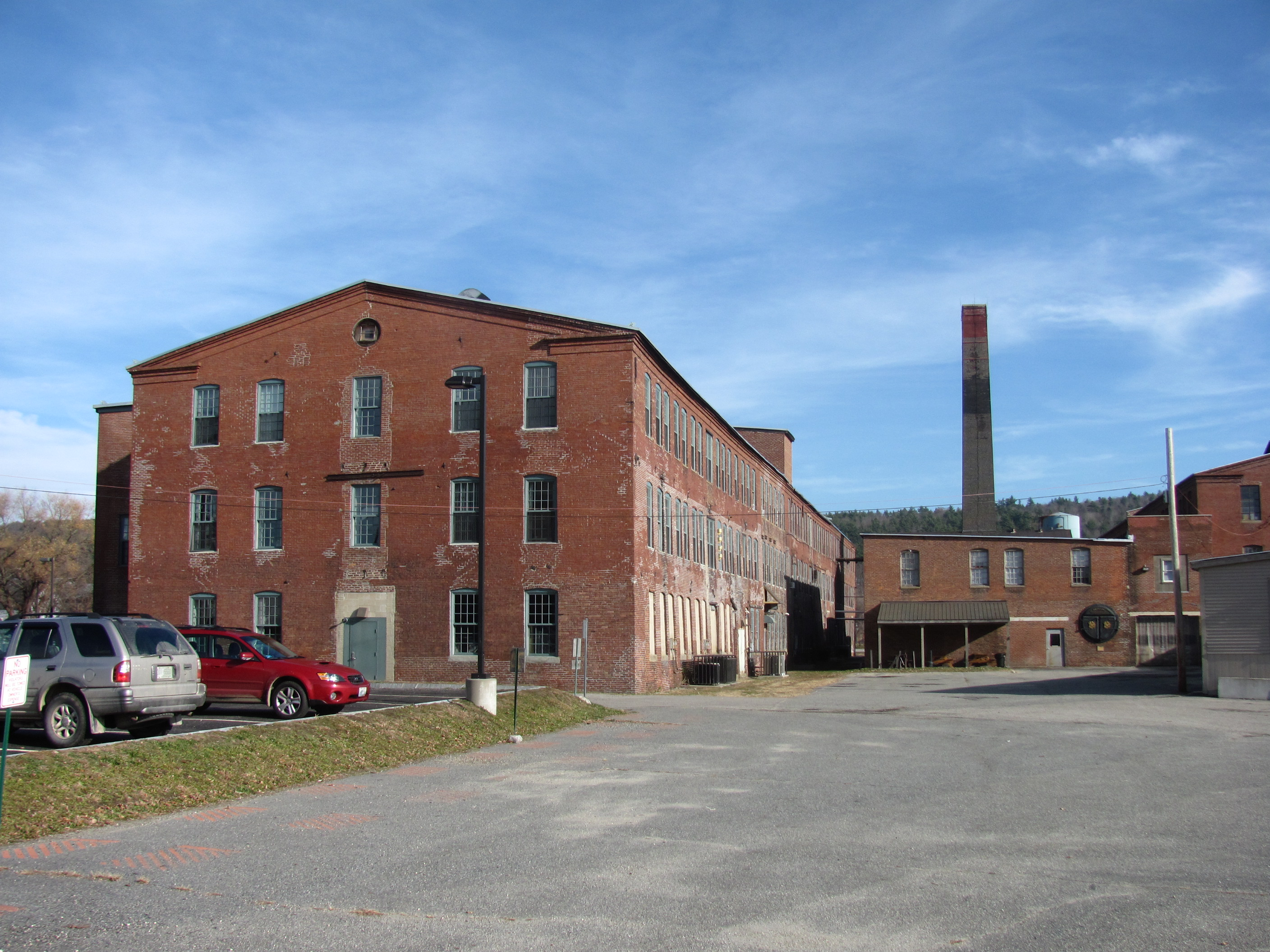
- Beaver Mills

- Location within New Hampshire Location within the United States
- Location: 93-115 Railroad Street; Keene, New Hampshire
- Coordinates: 42°55′55″N 72°16′25″W
- Area: 5.5 acres (2.2 ha)
- Built: 1871
- NRHP reference No.: 99001481
- Added to NRHP: December 9, 1999

The Beaver Mills are a historic mill complex located at 93–115 Railroad Street in Keene, New Hampshire, United States. The complex consists of two late 19th century brick mill buildings, along with several adjacent support buildings including warehouses, garages, and a boiler house. The oldest buildings at the site date to 1871–72.

Mill #1 is located at 115 Railroad Street. Originally, the mill complex included two buildings, that were joined in c. 1920 to create a 3 1/2-story brick building. Both older buildings date to 1871–2, with the northern one having a three-story addition added in 1915. Mill #2, 93 Railroad Street, is also 3.5 stories tall, and architecturally resembles the eastern portion of the #1 mill. It was originally built 1871–2 with a cupola, which was destroyed by fire in 1889 and not rebuilt. A long, two-story wood-frame building extends west from this building. A c. 1980 concrete and metal addition nearly doubles the size of the main mill building.

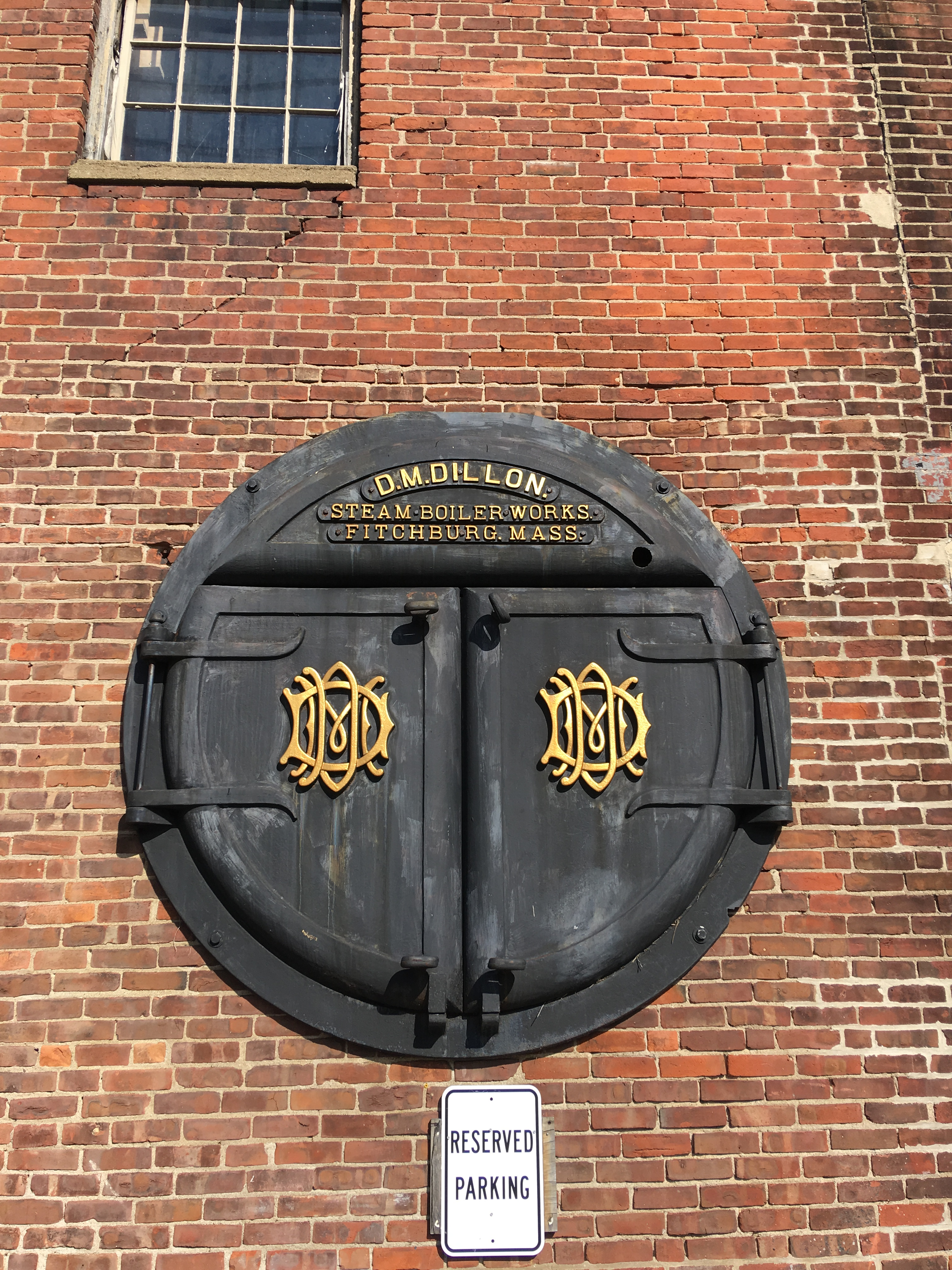
DM Dillon Boiler doors

The Beaver Mill complex was historically used for the construction of wood products and served as an "incubator" for small wood-working enterprises, providing steam power and access to the railroads. Products produced in the complex include chairs, boxes, pails, and buckets. The complex was the largest mill in the city at the time and is one of the few to survive. Mill #2 continues in industrial use, while mill #1 has been rezoned for commercial uses.

The mill complex was added to the National Register of Historic Places in 1999.

== See also ==
- National Register of Historic Places listings in Cheshire County, New Hampshire
