= Kendall Cottage =

Historic house in New Hampshire, United States

- U.S. National Register of Historic Places
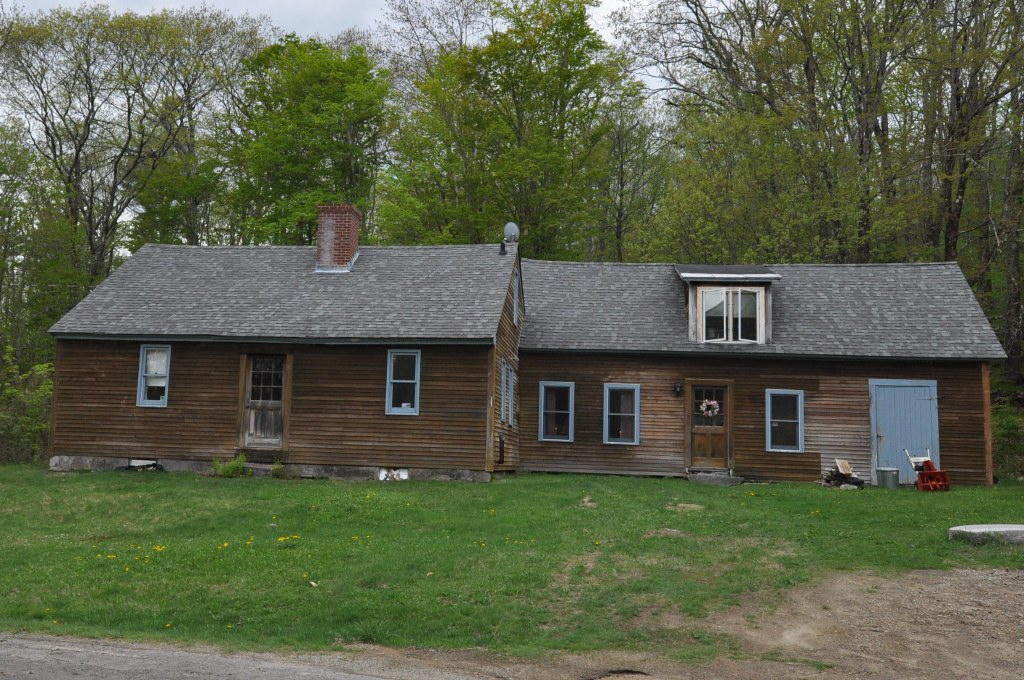

- Location within New Hampshire Location within the United States
- Location: Breed Rd., Harrisville, New Hampshire
- Coordinates: 42°56′46.5″N 72°8′10″W
- Area: 2.3 acres (0.93 ha)
- Built: 1798
- Architectural style: Cape cottage
- MPS: Harrisville MRA
- NRHP reference No.: 86003251
- Added to NRHP: January 14, 1988

The Kendall Cottage is a historic house on Breed Road in Harrisville, New Hampshire. Built in 1798, it is a well-preserved example of an early Cape-style hill country farmhouse, and one of a small number of surviving 18th-century buildings in the town. It was listed on the National Register of Historic Places in 1988.

== Description and history ==
The Kendall Cottage is located in a rural setting west of Harrisville's village center, on the northwest side of Breed Road just north of its junction with Yellow Wings Road. It is a 1 1/2-story timber-frame structure, with a gable roof, clapboarded exterior, and central chimney. Its main facade is three bays wide, with sash windows flanking the center entrance. Both the windows and the door are simply trimmed. An ell of similar size to the main block extends to the right, set back. It has three windows and a secondary entrance, with an equipment entrance at the far end.

The main (left side) portion of the house was built in 1798 by Joel Kendall; the right-hand portion, a near copy of the left side, was added c. 1930. The house is one of a few surviving vernacular hill farm houses in Harrisville; it was also later the home of Darius Farwell, one of the town's first selectmen.

== See also ==
- National Register of Historic Places listings in Cheshire County, New Hampshire
