= Stationmaster's House =

Historic house in New Hampshire, United States

- U.S. National Register of Historic Places
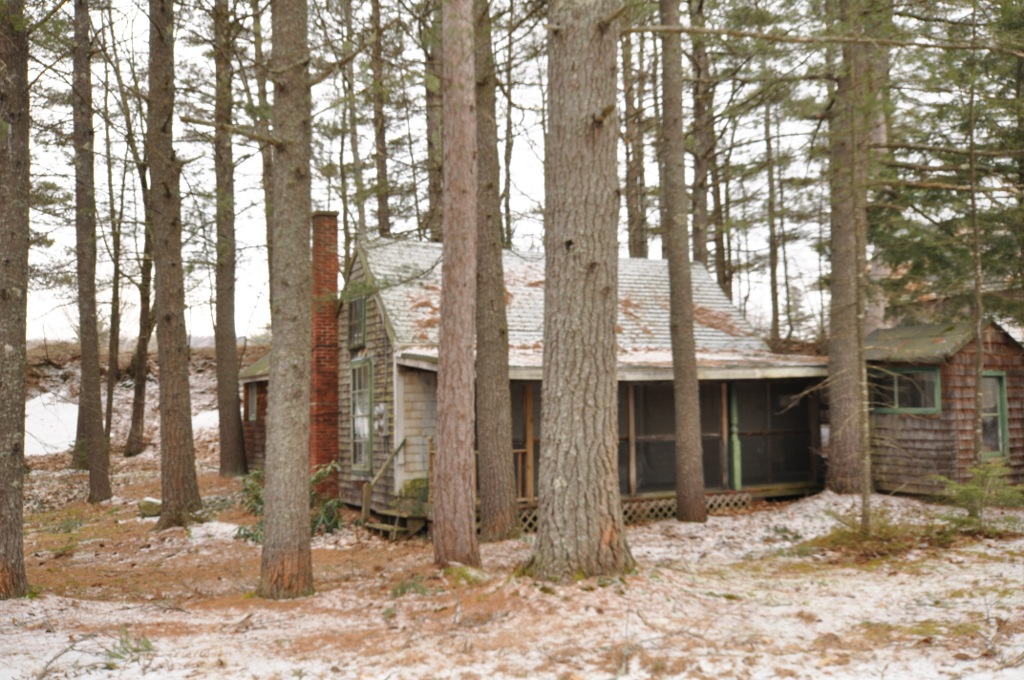

- Location within New Hampshire Location within the United States
- Location: Jaquith Rd., Harrisville, New Hampshire
- Coordinates: 42°56′3″N 72°2′13″W
- Area: 1.5 acres (0.61 ha)
- Built: 1896
- MPS: Harrisville MRA
- NRHP reference No.: 86003108
- Added to NRHP: January 14, 1988

The Stationmaster's House is a historic house on Jaquith Road in Harrisville, New Hampshire. Built in 1896, it is one of the few surviving elements of the town's historic railroad infrastructure. The house was listed on the National Register of Historic Places in 1988.

== Description and history ==
The Stationmaster's House is located in a rural setting of eastern Harrisville, on the west side of Jaquith Road, about 0.2 miles (0.32 km) north of Hancock Road.The house is located in a pine grove, just east of a former railroad right-of-way. It is a small 1 1/2-story wood-frame structure, with a gabled roof and shingled exterior. Notable in the building's construction are its lack of a proper foundation and mismatched windows. It has a three-bay facade on its main section, with a shed-roofed screened porch across the front, which is supported by turned posts. A gable-roofed ell extends at a right angle to the rear of the main block.

The house was built in 1896 by the Boston and Maine Railroad, and is one of only five buildings surviving in the town that was associated with railroad operations. Of those, it is the only stationmaster's house, and the only building of that group that was residential in nature.

== See also ==
- National Register of Historic Places listings in Cheshire County, New Hampshire
