= Jones Hall (Marlow, New Hampshire) =

Historic meeting house in New Hampshire, United States

- U.S. National Register of Historic Places
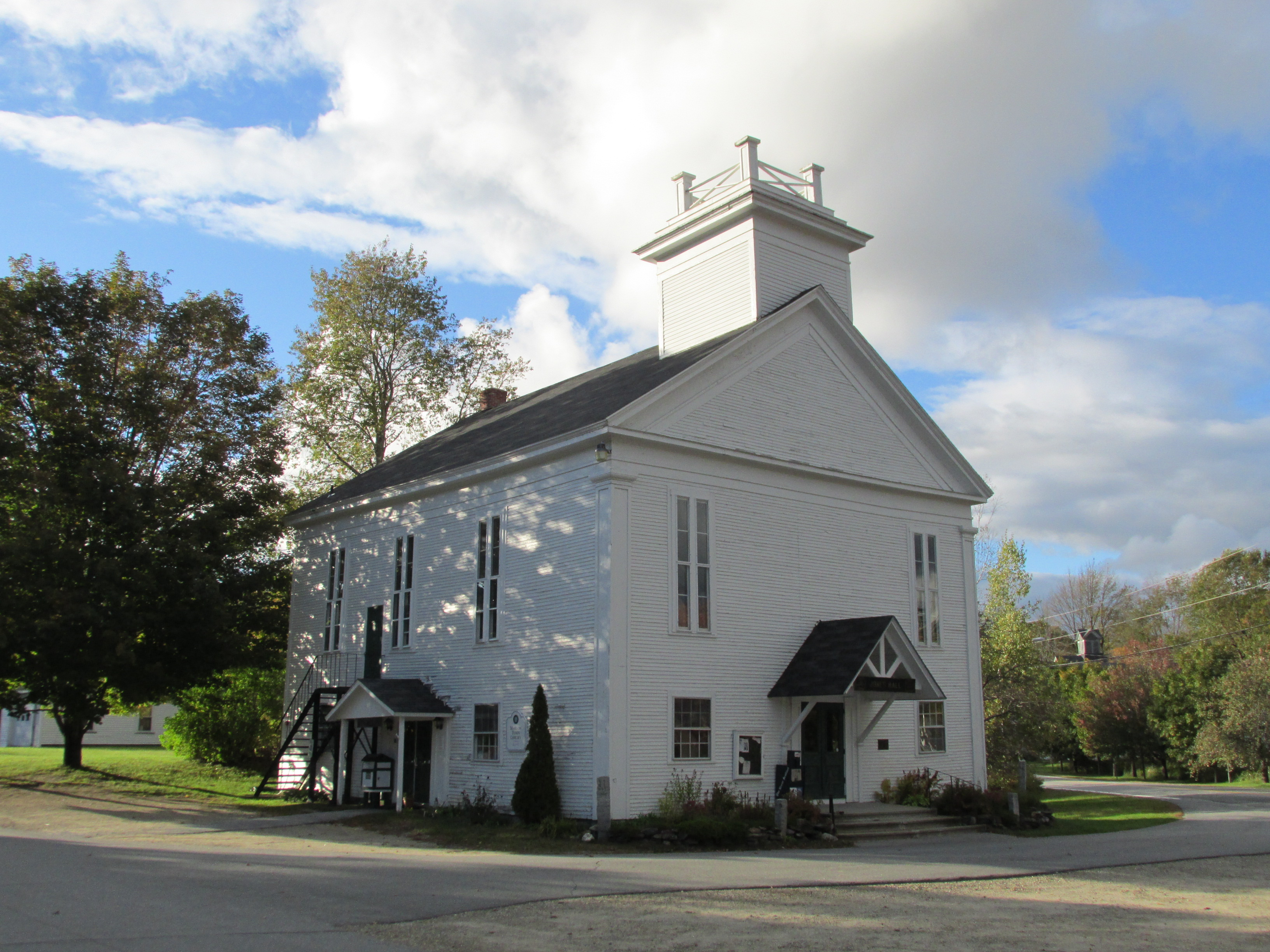

- Location within New Hampshire Location within the United States
- Location: Church St., Marlow, New Hampshire
- Coordinates: 43°6′59″N 72°11′59″W
- Area: 0.5 acres (0.20 ha)
- Built: 1792
- Architectural style: Greek Revival
- NRHP reference No.: 84002722
- Added to NRHP: June 7, 1984

Jones Hall, also known as The Meetinghouse at Marlow Hill or The Christian Church, is a historic church and municipal building on Church Street in Marlow, New Hampshire. Built between 1792 and 1800, it is a rare 18th-century meeting house in New Hampshire, although it has been altered somewhat and moved (in 1845) from its original location; it was said to originally be a near duplicate of the Rockingham Meeting House in Vermont. Construction of the timber frame building was repeatedly delayed due to a shortage of funding. It first served as a combined religious and civic meeting house, with ownership residing with the society of pew owners.

When it was moved in 1845, a number of alterations were made. Its box pews were removed, a second floor was added at the gallery level, and stair locations were changed. The upper level was then used for church services. It is at this time that the building probably received its Greek Revival features. In 1890 the building was sold to the Jones family, who converted the upper level into a more secular auditorium space. The gallery was enlarged, and the stage area was improved for use in theatrical productions. A heating system was added, and the church spire was removed.

The Joneses donated the building to the town in 1897. The upper level is used for community events, and the lower level houses the town library.

The building was listed on the National Register of Historic Places in 1984.

== See also ==
- National Register of Historic Places listings in Cheshire County, New Hampshire
