= National Register of Historic Places listings in Cheshire County, New Hampshire =

Location of Cheshire County in New Hampshire

156 properties and districts listed on the National Register of Historic Places are in Cheshire County, New Hampshire, United States, including 1 National Historic Landmark District. This is intended to be a complete list of those properties and districts. Latitude and longitude coordinates are provided for many National Register properties and districts; these locations may be seen together in a map.

Contents: Counties in New Hampshire
Belknap - Carroll - Cheshire - Coös - Grafton - Hillsborough - Merrimack - Rockingham - Strafford - Sullivan

This National Park Service list is complete through NPS recent listings posted April 24, 2026.

== Current listings ==
| | Name on the Register | Image | Date listed | Location | City or town | Description |
|---|---|---|---|---|---|---|
| 1 | The Acre | The Acre | January 14, 1988 (#86003257) | Main Street at Dublin Road; 42°56′12″N 72°05′25″W | Harrisville | |
| 2 | Adams Farm | Adams Farm | January 14, 1988 (#86003246) | Off MacVeagh Rd. near Fansnacloich; 42°55′41″N 72°07′24″W | Harrisville | |
| 3 | Dr. Daniel Adams House | Dr. Daniel Adams House | June 8, 1989 (#89000449) | 324 Main St. 42°55′32″N 72°16′36″W | Keene | |
| 4 | John Adams Homestead-Wellscroft | John Adams Homestead-Wellscroft | January 14, 1988 (#86003250) | West of Sunset Hill Rd. 42°56′59″N 72°08′57″W | Harrisville | |
| 5 | Aldworth Manor | Aldworth Manor | January 14, 1988 (#86003244) | Aldworth Drive, on the northern side of Chesham-Harrisville Rd. 42°57′01″N 72°06′55″W | Harrisville | |
| 6 | Capt. Samuel Allison House | Capt. Samuel Allison House | December 18, 1983 (#83004005) | Keene Rd. 42°54′43″N 72°06′51″W | Dublin | |
| 7 | Amory Ballroom | Amory Ballroom | May 2, 1985 (#85000921) | Off Old Troy Rd. 42°53′35″N 72°05′45″W | Dublin | |
| 8 | Amory House | Amory House | December 15, 1983 (#83004006) | Off Old Troy Rd. 42°53′37″N 72°06′01″W | Dublin | |
| 9 | Amory-Appel Cottage | Amory-Appel Cottage | May 2, 1985 (#85000920) | Off Old Troy Rd. 42°53′36″N 72°05′42″W | Dublin | |
| 10 | Appleton Farm | Appleton Farm | December 18, 1983 (#83004008) | 73 Brush Brook Rd. 42°54′26″N 72°01′24″W | Dublin | Houses Del Rossi's Trattoria |
| 11 | Appleton-Hannaford House | Appleton-Hannaford House | December 15, 1983 (#83004007) | 253 Hancock Rd. 42°54′37″N 72°00′25″W | Dublin | |
| 12 | Asbury United Methodist Church | Asbury United Methodist Church | December 21, 1983 (#83004009) | NH 63; 42°53′17″N 72°28′14″W | Chesterfield | |
| 13 | Ashuelot Covered Bridge | Ashuelot Covered Bridge | February 20, 1981 (#81000069) | NH 119 and Bolton Rd. 42°46′35″N 72°25′26″W | Ashuelot | Over Ashuelot River |
| 14 | Ballou-Newbegin House | Ballou-Newbegin House | December 18, 1983 (#83004011) | Old Marlborough Rd. 42°53′39″N 72°08′38″W | Dublin | |
| 15 | Timothy Bancroft House | Timothy Bancroft House | January 14, 1988 (#86003241) | Bancroft Rd. 42°57′57″N 72°05′55″W | Harrisville | |
| 16 | Persia Beal House | Persia Beal House | January 14, 1988 (#86003243) | Northern side of Chesham Rd. 42°56′41″N 72°06′15″W | Harrisville | Now the Harrisville Inn |
| 17 | Beaver Mills | Beaver Mills | December 9, 1999 (#99001481) | 93-115 Railroad St. 42°55′56″N 72°16′27″W | Keene | |
| 18 | Beech Hill | Beech Hill | December 15, 1983 (#83004012) | Off New Harrisville Rd. 42°54′39″N 72°04′00″W | Dublin | |
| 19 | Beech Hill Summer Home District | Beech Hill Summer Home District | January 14, 1988 (#86003079) | Roughly Venable, Appleton, and Old Harrisville Rds. 42°55′31″N 72°05′11″W | Harrisville | Six summer properties primarily along Old Harrisville Rd. |
| 20 | Elbridge G. Bemis House | Elbridge G. Bemis House | January 14, 1988 (#86003247) | Chesham Rd. 42°56′14″N 72°08′33″W | Harrisville | |
| 21 | George Bemis House | George Bemis House | January 14, 1988 (#86003248) | Chesham Rd. 42°56′15″N 72°08′31″W | Harrisville | |
| 22 | Brackett House | Brackett House | December 18, 1983 (#83004013) | High Ridge Rd. 42°52′45″N 71°59′45″W | Dublin | |
| 23 | Stephen Rowe Bradley House | Stephen Rowe Bradley House | December 22, 2005 (#05001445) | 43 Westminster St. 43°04′46″N 72°25′49″W | Walpole | |
| 24 | Buckminster-Kingsbury Farm | Buckminster-Kingsbury Farm | December 30, 2011 (#11000964) | 80 Houghton Ledge Rd. 42°58′30″N 72°12′37″W | Roxbury | |
| 25 | Burpee Farm | Burpee Farm | December 18, 1983 (#83004014) | Burpee Rd. 42°52′19″N 72°04′15″W | Dublin | Destroyed by fire in 2013 |
| 26 | Louis Cabot House | Louis Cabot House | December 18, 1983 (#83004015) | Windmill Hill Rd. 42°53′25″N 72°02′11″W | Dublin | |
| 27 | T. H. Cabot Cottage | T. H. Cabot Cottage | December 15, 1983 (#83004016) | Snow Hill Rd. 42°53′53″N 72°04′07″W | Dublin | |
| 28 | Carleton Bridge | Carleton Bridge | June 10, 1975 (#75000121) | On Carleton Rd. over South Branch Ashuelot River; 42°51′14″N 72°16′28″W | East Swanzey | |
| 29 | George Cheever Farm | George Cheever Farm | January 14, 1988 (#86003238) | Intersection of Nelson and Tolman Pond Rds. 42°57′20″N 72°06′29″W | Harrisville | |
| 30 | Chesham Village District | Chesham Village District | December 29, 1986 (#86003102) | Roughly bounded by Yellow Wings, Seaver, Chesham, and Marienfield Rds. 42°56′06″N 72°08′43″W | Harrisville | |
| 31 | Cheshire County Courthouse | Cheshire County Courthouse | December 13, 1978 (#78000210) | 12 Court St. 42°56′03″N 72°16′48″W | Keene | |
| 32 | Clay Memorial Library | Clay Memorial Library | October 16, 2023 (#100009441) | 38 Main St. 42°48′58″N 72°01′29″W | Jaffrey | |
| 33 | Clymer House | Clymer House | January 14, 1988 (#86003239) | 31 Clymer Rd. 42°57′40″N 72°06′14″W | Harrisville | |
| 34 | Colony House | Colony House | September 9, 2005 (#05000969) | 104 West St. 42°55′59″N 72°16′56″W | Keene | |
| 35 | Colony's Block | Colony's Block | March 24, 1983 (#83001134) | 4-7 Central Square; 42°56′02″N 72°16′40″W | Keene | |
| 36 | Conant Public Library | Conant Public Library | August 27, 1987 (#87001420) | Main St. 42°46′19″N 72°23′03″W | Winchester | |
| 37 | Noah Cooke House | Noah Cooke House | April 23, 1973 (#73000268) | West of Keene on Daniels Hill Rd. 42°55′32″N 72°20′24″W | Keene | |
| 38 | Coombs Covered Bridge | Coombs Covered Bridge | November 21, 1976 (#76000122) | North of Winchester off NH 10; 42°50′17″N 72°21′43″W | Winchester | Over Ashuelot River |
| 39 | Corey Farm | Corey Farm | December 15, 1983 (#83004017) | Parsons Rd. 42°53′01″N 72°02′59″W | Dublin | |
| 40 | Derby Shop-Goodnow Pail Factory-Holman & Merriman Machine Shop-L. A. Carpenter Machine Shop-Streeter Shop | Derby Shop-Goodnow Pail Factory-Holman & Merriman Machine Shop-L. A. Carpenter Machine Shop-Streeter Shop | December 11, 2007 (#07001260) | 63 Canal St. 42°47′17″N 72°28′30″W | Hinsdale | |
| 41 | Dinsmoor-Hale House | Dinsmoor-Hale House | April 26, 1976 (#76000197) | Main and Winchester Sts. 42°55′41″N 72°16′41″W | Keene | |
| 42 | Drewsville Mansion | Drewsville Mansion | September 13, 1996 (#96000953) | Old Cheshire Turnpike at the southern end of the Drewsville village common 43°07′36″N 72°23′34″W | Walpole | |
| 43 | Dublin Lake Historic District | Dublin Lake Historic District | December 18, 1983 (#83004018) | Lake, E. Lake, W. Lake, and Old Harrisville Rds. 42°54′30″N 72°05′00″W | Dublin | Properties surrounding the pond |
| 44 | Dublin Town Hall | Dublin Town Hall | June 25, 1980 (#80000275) | NH 101; 42°54′21″N 72°03′39″W | Dublin | |
| 45 | Dublin Village Historic District | Dublin Village Historic District | December 15, 1983 (#83004019) | Old Common and Harrisville Rds. and Main and Church Sts. 42°54′22″N 72°03′37″W | Dublin | |
| 46 | East Jaffrey Historic District | East Jaffrey Historic District | June 14, 2002 (#02000642) | Roughly along NH 124 through Jaffrey; 42°49′40″N 72°03′17″W | Jaffrey | |
| 47 | Moses Eaton Jr. House | Moses Eaton Jr. House | January 14, 1988 (#86003106) | NH 137; 42°56′04″N 72°00′57″W | Harrisville | |
| 48 | Elliot Mansion | Elliot Mansion | April 30, 1976 (#76000220) | 305 Main St. 42°55′33″N 72°16′41″W | Keene | |
| 49 | Eveleth Farm | Eveleth Farm | December 18, 1983 (#83004020) | Burpee Rd. 42°52′20″N 72°04′24″W | Dublin | |
| 50 | Far Horizons | Far Horizons | December 15, 1983 (#83004023) | Learned Rd. 42°52′48″N 72°04′23″W | Dublin | |
| 51 | Corban C. Farwell Homestead | Corban C. Farwell Homestead | January 14, 1988 (#86003253) | Breed Rd. at Cricket Hill Rd. 42°57′09″N 72°07′50″W | Harrisville | |
| 52 | Fasnacloich | Fasnacloich | January 14, 1988 (#86003245) | Four Hill Rd., north of the Dublin town line 42°55′27″N 72°06′30″W | Harrisville | |
| 53 | Faulkner & Colony Woolen Mill | Faulkner & Colony Woolen Mill | March 25, 2020 (#100005161) | 222 West St. 42°55′57″N 72°17′14″W | Keene | |
| 54 | Fisk Barn | Fisk Barn | December 18, 1983 (#83004024) | Gerry Rd. 42°53′38″N 72°01′42″W | Dublin | |
| 55 | Catherine Fiske Seminary For Young Ladies | Catherine Fiske Seminary For Young Ladies | May 3, 1976 (#76000196) | 251 Main St. 42°55′39″N 72°16′41″W | Keene | |
| 56 | Fitzwilliam Common Historic District | Fitzwilliam Common Historic District | May 2, 1997 (#97000399) | Junction of NH 119, Richmond Rd., and the Templeton Highway; 42°46′45″N 72°08′47″W | Fitzwilliam | |
| 57 | Foothill Farm | Foothill Farm | December 15, 1983 (#83004025) | Old Troy Rd. 42°53′47″N 72°06′16″W | Dublin | |
| 58 | Frost Farm | Frost Farm | December 15, 1983 (#83004026) | Old Marlborough Rd. 42°53′54″N 72°06′37″W | Dublin | Now Fairwood Bible Institute |
| 59 | Frost Farm | Frost Farm | December 18, 1983 (#83004027) | Korpi Rd. 42°52′15″N 72°01′35″W | Dublin | |
| 60 | Gilchrest | Gilchrest | January 14, 1988 (#86003105) | NH 137; 42°55′44″N 72°00′57″W | Harrisville | |
| 61 | Gilsum Stone Arch Bridge | Gilsum Stone Arch Bridge | August 31, 1989 (#89001207) | Surry Rd. over the Ashuelot River, west of its junction with NH 10; 43°02′20″N 72°16′14″W | Gilsum | |
| 62 | Glenchrest | Glenchrest | January 14, 1988 (#86003104) | NH 137; 42°55′38″N 72°00′54″W | Harrisville | |
| 63 | Golden Rod Grange No. 114 | Golden Rod Grange No. 114 | March 17, 1994 (#94000169) | Western side of NH 32, 0.1 mi (0.16 km) south of its junction with Eaton Rd. 42°52′20″N 72°16′57″W | Swanzey | |
| 64 | James Gowing Farm | James Gowing Farm | December 18, 1983 (#83004028) | Page Rd. 42°52′41″N 72°02′13″W | Dublin | Now the Dublin Christian Academy |
| 65 | Joseph Gowing Farm | Joseph Gowing Farm | December 15, 1983 (#83004029) | Page Rd. 42°52′53″N 72°02′13″W | Dublin | |
| 66 | Grace United Methodist Church | Grace United Methodist Church | March 7, 1985 (#85000476) | 34 Court St. 42°56′07″N 72°16′48″W | Keene | |
| 67 | Isaac Greenwood House | Isaac Greenwood House | December 18, 1983 (#83004034) | Peterborough Rd. 42°54′26″N 72°02′34″W | Dublin | |
| 68 | Moses Greenwood House | Moses Greenwood House | December 15, 1983 (#83004036) | Pierce and Old County Rds. 42°54′16″N 72°02′33″W | Dublin | |
| 69 | Harrisville Historic District | Harrisville Historic District | September 17, 1971 (#71000072) | Central Harrisville and its environs 42°56′52″N 72°05′49″W | Harrisville and vicinity | National Historic Landmark; a picturesque mill town |
| 70 | Harrisville Rural District | Harrisville Rural District | February 18, 1987 (#86003078) | Roughly along Venable, Old Harrisville, New Harrisville, and Bonds Corner Rds. 42°55′36″N 72°04′42″W | Harrisville | |
| 71 | High Tops School | High Tops School | December 13, 1984 (#84000519) | Reynolds and River Rds. 42°57′45″N 72°29′16″W | Westmoreland | |
| 72 | Hutchinson House | Hutchinson House | February 2, 2015 (#14001240) | 400 Alstead Center Rd. 43°07′26″N 72°19′39″W | Alstead | |
| 73 | Ivanov-Rinov House | Ivanov-Rinov House | December 18, 1983 (#83004038) | 88 Pierce Rd. 42°53′58″N 72°02′34″W | Dublin | |
| 74 | Jaffrey Center Historic District | Jaffrey Center Historic District | June 11, 1975 (#75000122) | Northwest of Jaffrey on NH 124; 42°49′38″N 72°03′13″W | Jaffrey | |
| 75 | Jaffrey Mills | Jaffrey Mills | August 10, 1982 (#82004992) | 41 Main St. 42°48′54″N 72°01′25″W | Jaffrey | Converted to residences |
| 76 | Jewett-Kemp-Marlens House | Jewett-Kemp-Marlens House | May 30, 1997 (#97000506) | North Rd., 2 mi (3.2 km) north of its junction with NH 123; 43°09′26″N 72°17′36″W | Alstead | |
| 77 | Jones Hall | Jones Hall | June 7, 1984 (#84002722) | Church St. 43°06′59″N 72°11′59″W | Marlow | |
| 78 | Joslin-Faulkner-Putnam House | | June 8, 2021 (#100006656) | 150 Court St. 42°56′16″N 72°16′55″W | Keene | |
| 79 | Keene Unitarian Universalist Church | Keene Unitarian Universalist Church | September 27, 2024 (#100010873) | 69 Washington St. 42°56′10″N 72°16′38″W | Keene | |
| 80 | Kendall Cottage | Kendall Cottage | January 14, 1988 (#86003251) | Northern side of Silver Lake Rd. 42°56′46″N 72°08′11″W | Harrisville | |
| 81 | Knollwood | Knollwood | December 18, 1983 (#83004039) | Windmill Hill Rd. 42°53′35″N 72°03′34″W | Dublin | |
| 82 | Lattice Cottage | Lattice Cottage | December 15, 1983 (#83004040) | Off Old Troy Rd. 42°53′31″N 72°05′38″W | Dublin | |
| 83 | Lawrence Farm | Lawrence Farm | June 9, 2000 (#00000650) | 9 Lawrence Rd. 42°50′39″N 72°11′11″W | Troy | |
| 84 | Learned Homestead | Learned Homestead | December 15, 1983 (#83004043) | Upper Jaffrey Rd. 42°53′41″N 72°03′37″W | Dublin | |
| 85 | Amos Learned Farm | Amos Learned Farm | December 15, 1983 (#83004041) | NH 137; 42°53′34″N 72°01′27″W | Dublin | |
| 86 | Benjamin Learned House | Benjamin Learned House | December 18, 1983 (#83004042) | Upper Jaffrey Rd. 42°53′46″N 72°03′37″W | Dublin | |
| 87 | Markham House | Markham House | December 18, 1983 (#83004044) | Snow Hill Rd. 42°54′11″N 72°04′06″W | Dublin | |
| 88 | Benjamin Marshall House | Benjamin Marshall House | December 15, 1983 (#83004046) | 1541 Peterborough Rd. 42°54′05″N 72°01′28″W | Dublin | |
| 89 | Micajah Martin Farm | Micajah Martin Farm | December 18, 1983 (#83004047) | Old Peterborough Rd. 42°53′44″N 72°00′44″W | Dublin | |
| 90 | Mason House | Mason House | December 15, 1983 (#83004049) | Snow Hill Rd. 42°54′06″N 72°03′57″W | Dublin | |
| 91 | Mason-Watkins House | Mason-Watkins House | March 11, 1982 (#82001670) | RD # 2; 42°59′12″N 72°20′18″W | Surry | |
| 92 | McKenna Cottage | McKenna Cottage | December 18, 1983 (#83004051) | Windmill Hill Rd. 42°53′37″N 72°02′58″W | Dublin | |
| 93 | Moore Farm and Twitchell Mill Site | Moore Farm and Twitchell Mill Site | December 18, 1983 (#83004052) | Off Page Rd. 42°51′58″N 72°02′04″W | Dublin | |
| 94 | Asa Morse Farm | Asa Morse Farm | December 15, 1983 (#83004054) | NH 101; 42°54′47″N 72°05′39″W | Dublin | |
| 95 | Capt. Thomas Morse Farm | Capt. Thomas Morse Farm | December 15, 1983 (#83004055) | Old Marlborough Rd. 42°54′01″N 72°06′22″W | Dublin | |
| 96 | Eli Morse Farm | Eli Morse Farm | April 11, 1983 (#83001135) | Lake Rd. 42°53′43″N 72°05′08″W | Dublin | |
| 97 | Eli Morse Sawmill Foundations | Eli Morse Sawmill Foundations | December 18, 1983 (#83004056) | Off Old Marlborough Rd. 42°53′57″N 72°05′31″W | Dublin | |
| 98 | Mountain View Farm | Mountain View Farm | December 18, 1983 (#83004057) | Upper Jaffrey Rd. 42°53′20″N 72°04′03″W | Dublin | |
| 99 | Needham House | Needham House | January 14, 1988 (#86003254) | Meadow Rd. 42°55′45″N 72°09′07″W | Harrisville | |
| 100 | Nelson Schoolhouse | Nelson Schoolhouse | April 23, 1973 (#73000251) | Old Sullivan Rd. 42°59′22″N 72°07′38″W | Nelson | |
| 101 | New Hampshire Conservatory of Music and the Arts | New Hampshire Conservatory of Music and the Arts | May 15, 1980 (#80000276) | Central Sq. 42°46′24″N 72°22′59″W | Winchester | |
| 102 | Old Patch Place | Old Patch Place | August 15, 1980 (#80000277) | West of Fitzwilliam on Rhododendron Rd. 42°47′02″N 72°11′28″W | Fitzwilliam | |
| 103 | Park Hill Meetinghouse | Park Hill Meetinghouse | September 8, 1980 (#80000278) | Park Hill; 42°58′31″N 72°27′24″W | Westmoreland | |
| 104 | Parsons Studio and Casino | Parsons Studio and Casino | December 18, 1983 (#83004058) | Parsons Rd. 42°53′07″N 72°03′07″W | Dublin | |
| 105 | Peck-Porter House | Peck-Porter House | August 31, 2000 (#00001037) | Main St., junction with Middle St. 43°04′41″N 72°25′37″W | Walpole | |
| 106 | Ivory Perry Homestead | Ivory Perry Homestead | December 15, 1983 (#83004061) | Corner Valley and Dooe Rds. 42°52′38″N 72°00′01″W | Dublin | |
| 107 | John Perry Homestead | John Perry Homestead | December 18, 1983 (#83004063) | 135 Dooe Rd. 42°52′45″N 72°00′18″W | Dublin | |
| 108 | Rufus Piper Homestead | Rufus Piper Homestead | December 15, 1983 (#83004065) | Pierce Rd. 42°53′45″N 72°02′30″W | Dublin | |
| 109 | Solomon Piper Farm | Solomon Piper Farm | December 18, 1983 (#83004067) | 227 Valley Rd. 42°52′22″N 72°00′05″W | Dublin | |
| 110 | Point Comfort | Point Comfort | January 14, 1988 (#86003256) | S. Skatutakee Rd. 42°56′10″N 72°05′01″W | Harrisville | |
| 111 | Pottersville District | Pottersville District | December 29, 1986 (#86003096) | Roughly intersection of Roxbury and Meadow Rds., and along Brown Rd. northeast of Chesham Rd. 42°55′44″N 72°08′41″W | Harrisville | Properties primarily along Chesham Rd. from Meadow Rd to Brown Rd., then along Brown Rd. |
| 112 | Pumpelly Studio | Pumpelly Studio | December 15, 1983 (#83004069) | Snow Hill Rd. 42°53′56″N 72°04′13″W | Dublin | |
| 113 | Raubold House | Raubold House | January 14, 1988 (#86003242) | Northern side of Chesham Rd. 42°56′43″N 72°06′09″W | Harrisville | |
| 114 | Abijah Richardson, Sr. Homestead | Abijah Richardson, Sr. Homestead | December 18, 1983 (#83004070) | 359 Hancock Rd. 42°54′46″N 72°00′06″W | Dublin | |
| 115 | Deacon Abijah Richardson House | Deacon Abijah Richardson House | December 15, 1983 (#83004071) | 334 Hancock Rd. 42°54′42″N 72°00′04″W | Dublin | |
| 116 | John Richardson Homestead | John Richardson Homestead | December 18, 1983 (#83004072) | Hancock Rd. 42°55′00″N 72°00′06″W | Dublin | |
| 117 | Luke Richardson House | Luke Richardson House | December 15, 1983 (#83004073) | 204 Hancock Rd. 42°54′35″N 72°00′44″W | Dublin | |
| 118 | Richmond Community Church | Richmond Community Church | March 24, 1983 (#83001136) | Fitzwilliam Rd. 42°45′16″N 72°16′17″W | Richmond | |
| 119 | Richmond School House No. 6 | Richmond School House No. 6 | November 25, 1980 (#80000279) | NH 119; 42°45′19″N 72°16′27″W | Richmond | Now houses the local public library |
| 120 | Richmond Town Hall | Richmond Town Hall | December 19, 1979 (#79000273) | NH 32; 42°45′46″N 72°16′08″W | Richmond | |
| 121 | James Robbe Jr. House | James Robbe Jr. House | December 18, 1983 (#83004074) | Old Peterborough Rd. 42°53′29″N 72°00′01″W | Dublin | |
| 122 | Sawyer Tavern | Sawyer Tavern | May 15, 1980 (#80000280) | 63 Arch St. 42°56′21″N 72°19′00″W | Keene | |
| 123 | Sawyers Crossing Covered Bridge | Sawyers Crossing Covered Bridge | November 14, 1978 (#78000211) | North of Swanzey off NH 32; 42°53′10″N 72°17′12″W | Swanzey | Over Ashuelot River |
| 124 | Second Rindge Meetinghouse, Horsesheds and Cemetery | Second Rindge Meetinghouse, Horsesheds and Cemetery | October 5, 1979 (#79003791) | U.S. Route 202 and Rindge Common; 42°44′59″N 72°00′37″W | Rindge | |
| 125 | Shedd-Porter Memorial Library | Shedd-Porter Memorial Library | December 27, 2010 (#10001086) | 3 Main St. 43°08′56″N 72°21′40″W | Alstead | |
| 126 | Silver Lake District | Silver Lake District | December 29, 1986 (#86003100) | Roughly along Old Nelson, Eastside, and Westside Rds. 42°57′03″N 72°08′09″W | Harrisville | Around Silver Lake |
| 127 | Silver Lake Farm | Silver Lake Farm | January 14, 1988 (#86003252) | Between Silver Lake and Seaver Rds. near the intersection with Old Nelson Rd. 42°56′52″N 72°07′56″W | Harrisville | |
| 128 | Slate Covered Bridge | Slate Covered Bridge | November 14, 1978 (#78000212) | Off NH 10; 42°50′51″N 72°20′29″W | Westport | Over Ashuelot River |
| 129 | Smith-Mason Farm | Smith-Mason Farm | January 14, 1988 (#86003255) | Northwest of the intersection of Meadow and Old Roxbury Roads; 42°55′55″N 72°09′22″W | Harrisville | |
| 130 | Spur House | Spur House | December 15, 1983 (#83004075) | Off Old Common Rd. 42°54′32″N 72°04′05″W | Dublin | |
| 131 | Stationmaster's House | Stationmaster's House | January 14, 1988 (#86003108) | Jaquith Rd. 42°56′03″N 72°02′13″W | Harrisville | |
| 132 | Stone Arch Bridge | Stone Arch Bridge | August 14, 2012 (#12000504) | Mile 89.41 of the Cheshire Railroad over Branch River, between Route 101 and Swanzey Factory Road; 42°54′51″N 72°15′11″W | Keene | |
| 133 | Stone Farm | Stone Farm | December 18, 1983 (#83004076) | Old Marlborough Rd. 42°53′41″N 72°08′54″W | Dublin | |
| 134 | Stone-Darracott House | Stone-Darracott House | December 15, 1983 (#83004077) | Old Marlborough Rd. 42°53′34″N 72°08′54″W | Dublin | |
| 135 | Stonehenge | Stonehenge | December 18, 1983 (#83004079) | Windmill Hill Rd. 42°53′41″N 72°03′01″W | Dublin | |
| 136 | Capt. Richard Strong House | Capt. Richard Strong House | December 18, 1983 (#83004080) | 1471 Peterborough Rd. 42°54′14″N 72°01′46″W | Dublin | |
| 137 | Richard Strong Cottage | Richard Strong Cottage | December 15, 1983 (#83004081) | 35 Gowing Lane; 42°54′12″N 72°01′37″W | Dublin | |
| 138 | Henry Strongman House | Henry Strongman House | December 15, 1983 (#83004082) | 1443 Peterborough Rd. 42°54′19″N 72°01′54″W | Dublin | |
| 139 | William Strongman House | William Strongman House | December 18, 1983 (#83004083) | 85 Old County Rd. 42°54′19″N 72°02′20″W | Dublin | |
| 140 | Third Fitzwilliam Meetinghouse | Third Fitzwilliam Meetinghouse | August 26, 1977 (#77000162) | Village Green; 42°46′46″N 72°08′41″W | Fitzwilliam | |
| 141 | Todd Block | Todd Block | June 14, 1988 (#88000646) | 27-31 Main St. 42°47′12″N 72°29′33″W | Hinsdale | |
| 142 | Townsend Farm | Townsend Farm | December 15, 1983 (#83004084) | E. Harrisville Rd. 42°55′04″N 72°02′20″W | Dublin | |
| 143 | Jabez Townsend House | Jabez Townsend House | January 14, 1988 (#86003107) | Hancock and Cherry Hill Rds. 42°55′48″N 72°02′15″W | Harrisville | |
| 144 | Troy Village Historic District | Troy Village Historic District | December 13, 2002 (#02001500) | Encompassing the village center, mostly along NH 12; 42°49′28″N 72°10′57″W | Troy | |
| 145 | United Church of Christ in Keene | United Church of Christ in Keene | March 9, 1982 (#82001671) | 23 Central Sq. 42°56′04″N 72°16′43″W | Keene | |
| 146 | Veterans' Memorial Hall | Veterans' Memorial Hall | September 4, 1986 (#86002160) | NH 32; 42°45′53″N 72°16′09″W | Richmond | |
| 147 | Mary Anne Wales House | Mary Anne Wales House | December 18, 1983 (#83004085) | Snow Hill Rd. 42°54′14″N 72°04′01″W | Dublin | |
| 148 | Walpole Academy | Walpole Academy | May 21, 1975 (#75000230) | Main St. 43°04′44″N 72°25′32″W | Walpole | |
| 149 | Weldwood | Weldwood | December 15, 1983 (#83004086) | Old Troy Rd. 42°53′17″N 72°06′25″W | Dublin | |
| 150 | West Swanzey Covered Bridge | West Swanzey Covered Bridge | February 29, 1980 (#80000281) | Main St. 42°52′18″N 72°19′42″W | West Swanzey | Over Ashuelot River |
| 151 | Wildwood Cottage | Wildwood Cottage | January 14, 1988 (#86003240) | Bancroft Rd. 42°57′55″N 72°05′58″W | Harrisville | |
| 152 | Willard Homestead | Willard Homestead | January 14, 1988 (#86003249) | Sunset Hill Ave. 42°56′42″N 72°08′57″W | Harrisville | |
| 153 | Winchester Town Hall | Winchester Town Hall | August 27, 1987 (#87001419) | Main St. 42°46′22″N 72°23′02″W | Winchester | |
| 154 | Windmill Hill | Windmill Hill | December 18, 1983 (#83004087) | Windmill Hill Rd. 42°53′14″N 72°02′09″W | Dublin | |
| 155 | Wood House | Wood House | December 15, 1983 (#83004088) | NH 101 and NH 137; 42°54′00″N 72°01′25″W | Dublin | |
| 156 | Wyman Tavern | Wyman Tavern | April 3, 1972 (#72000106) | 339 Main St. 42°55′30″N 72°16′39″W | Keene | |

== See also ==
- List of National Historic Landmarks in New Hampshire
- National Register of Historic Places listings in New Hampshire
