= Appleton-Hannaford House =

Historic house in New Hampshire, United States

- U.S. National Register of Historic Places
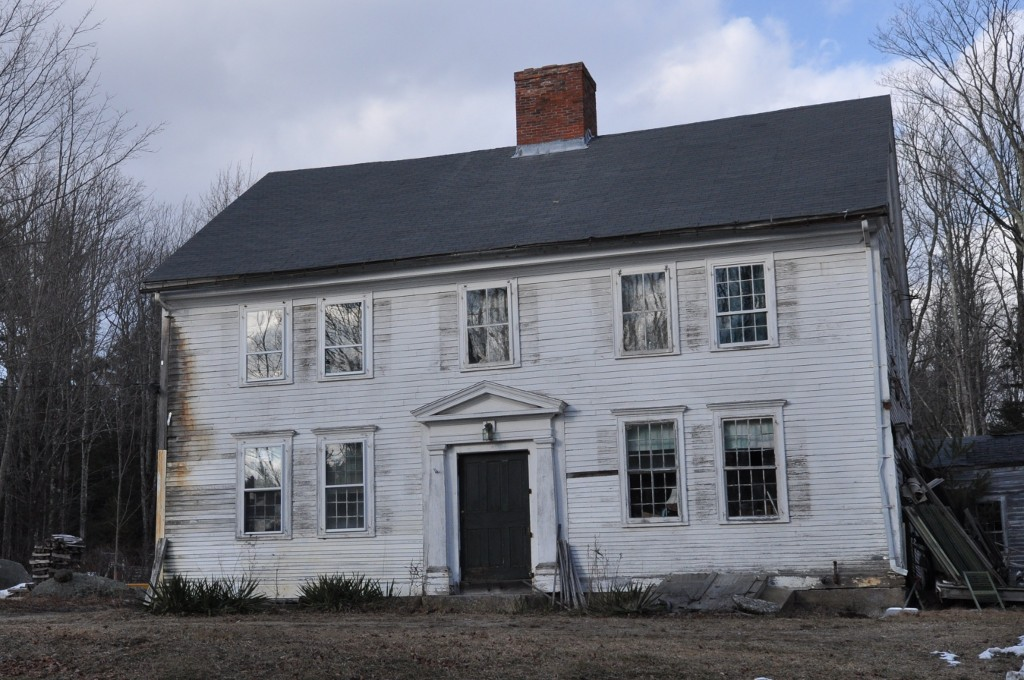

- Location within New Hampshire Location within the United States
- Location: Hancock Rd., Dublin, New Hampshire
- Coordinates: 42°54′37″N 72°0′25″W
- Area: 1.4 acres (0.57 ha)
- Built: 1785
- Architectural style: Georgian
- MPS: Dublin MRA
- NRHP reference No.: 83004007
- Added to NRHP: December 15, 1983

The Appleton-Hannaford House is a historic house on Hancock Road in Dublin, New Hampshire. Built about 1785 for the son of an early settler, it is one of the town's oldest surviving buildings, and a little-altered example of Georgian residential architecture. The house was listed on the National Register of Historic Places in 1983.

== Description and history ==
The Appleton-Hannaford House is located in a rural setting in eastern Dublin, set in a small clearing on the north side of Hancock Road (New Hampshire Route 137) east of Greenwood Road. It is a 2 1/2-story wood-frame structure, with a gabled roof, central chimney, and clapboarded exterior. The main facade is five bays wide, with sash windows arranged symmetrically around the main entrance. The first-floor windows have moulded surrounds with slightly projecting lintels. The entrance is flanked by pilasters and topped by an entablature and fully pedimented gable. A single-story ell extends to the right side. The interior includes original wide board paneling.

The house was built c. 1785 by Isaac Appleton, a prominent local farmer and politician, and son of one of its early proprietors. In addition to serving as town selectman and trustee of the town library, Appleton was also a representative in the state legislature. The house passed to the related Richardson family in 1869, and was owned by the Hannafords (related to the Richardsons by marriage) until 1970.

== See also ==
- Appleton Farm, built by Isaac's brother Francis
- National Register of Historic Places listings in Cheshire County, New Hampshire
