= T. H. Cabot Cottage =

Historic house in New Hampshire, United States

- U.S. National Register of Historic Places
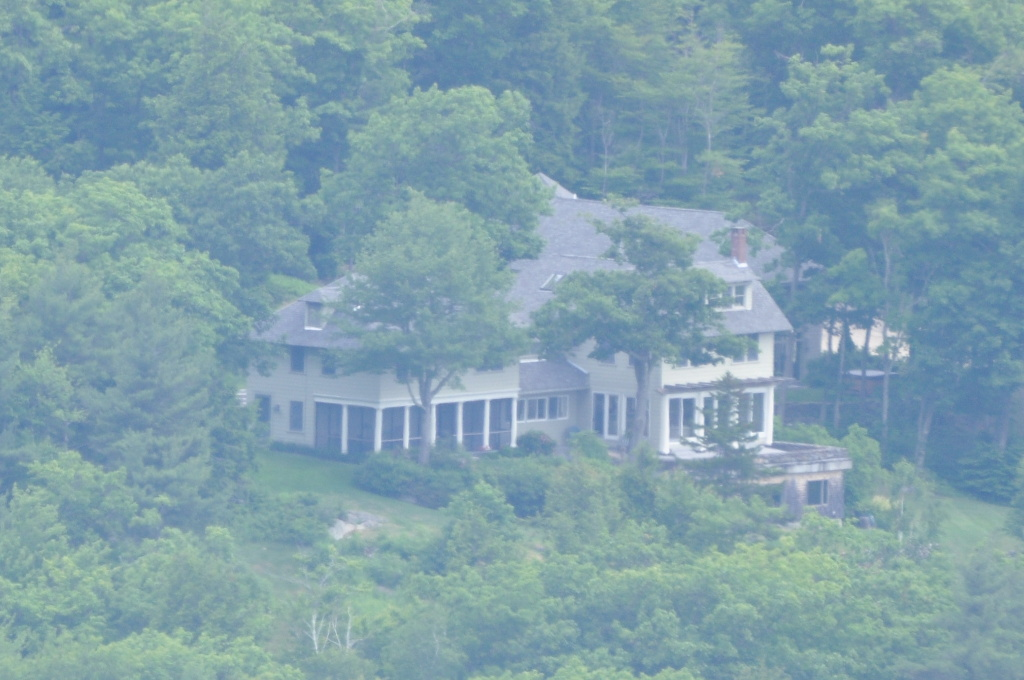
- Possibly the cottage (if greatly enlarged), or a replacement building

- Location within New Hampshire Location within the United States
- Location: Snow Hill Rd., Dublin, New Hampshire
- Coordinates: 42°53′53″N 72°4′7″W
- Area: 0.7 acres (0.28 ha)
- Built: 1899
- Architect: Cabot, Elise Pumpelly
- Architectural style: Georgian Revival
- MPS: Dublin MRA
- NRHP reference No.: 83004016
- Added to NRHP: December 15, 1983

The T. H. Cabot Cottage is a historic summer house off Snow Hill Road in Dublin, New Hampshire. The cottage is one several buildings that was built by geologist Raphael Pumpelly on his summer estate "Pompilia". Built in 1899 after his daughter's marriage to Thomas Handasyd Cabot, it is a good example of Georgian Revival architecture. The house was listed on the National Register of Historic Places in 1983.

== Description and history ==
The T.H. Cabot Cottage is located in a rural setting between the Dublin village center and Mount Monadnock. It is located on the south side of Snow Hill, a knoll forming part of a ridge extending north from the mountain. The entire knoll is the site of the former Pumpelly Estate, and is accessed via Pumpelly Road, a private lane. The Cabot Cottage is located high on the south side of the knoll, in a clearing with views of the mountain. As described for its National Register listing, it is a 2 1/2-story wood-frame structure, with a hip roof and clapboarded exterior. The roof has extended eaves with exposed rafter ends. The front of the house is sheltered by a single-story shed-roof porch supported by round columns. Sash windows are generally set in groups of two or three on each of the facades.

The house was built by geologist Raphael Pumpelly in 1899, and appears to have been designed by his daughter, Elise Pumpelly Cabot. At the time of its listing on the National Register, the house remained in the hands of Cabot's descendants. It is possible the house has been torn down and replaced by a larger structure (see photo), or that it has been incorporated into that structure.

== See also ==
- National Register of Historic Places listings in Cheshire County, New Hampshire
