= Faulkner & Colony Woolen Mill =

- U.S. National Register of Historic Places
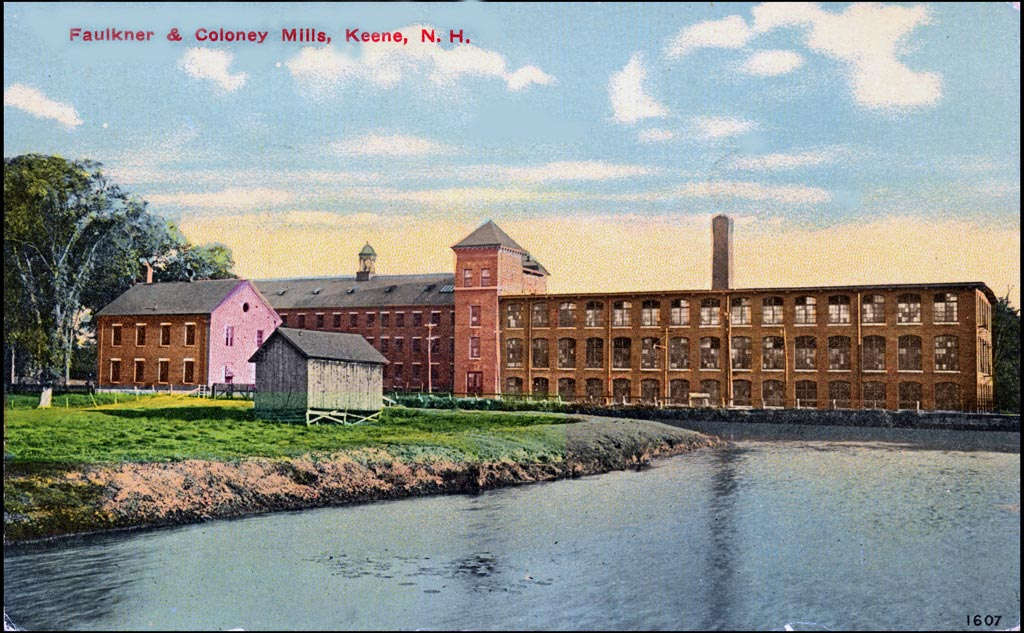

- Location within New Hampshire Location within the United States
- Location: 222 West Street, Keene, New Hampshire
- Coordinates: 42.9324°N 72.2871°W
- Built: 1838
- NRHP reference No.: 100005161
- Added to NRHP: March 25, 2020

The Faulkner & Colony Woolen Mill is an historic mill building located at 222 West Street in Keene, New Hampshire. It was added to the National Register of Historic Places (NRHP) in 2020.

The main building was constructed in 1838 and was subsequently expanded in 1859. The mill was named after Francis Faulkner and Josiah Colony, who owned multiple mills along the Ashuelot River. In addition to the main mill building, a former boarding house (built 1810) and a storehouse (built 1859) are included in the NRHP listing. The mill provided material for many uses, including to the U.S. military during the Civil War, World War I, and World War II.

Mid-20th century developments in synthetics caused the mill to close in 1954, making it the longest running family-owned textile mill in the country. The property was converted to retail and office space in 1983 and was later converted into residential apartments.

== See also ==
- National Register of Historic Places listings in Cheshire County, New Hampshire
