= Todd Block =

- U.S. National Register of Historic Places
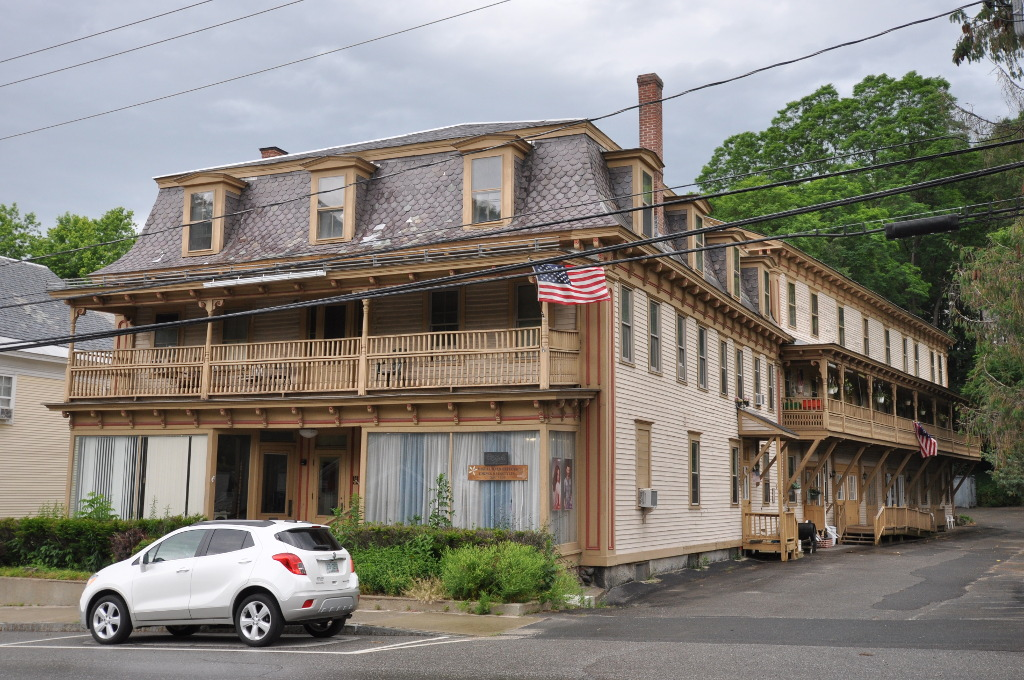

- Location within New Hampshire Location within the United States
- Location: 27-31 Main St., Hinsdale, New Hampshire
- Coordinates: 42°47′12″N 72°29′33″W
- Area: 0.6 acres (0.24 ha)
- Built: 1862
- Architectural style: Second Empire, Queen Anne, Italianate
- NRHP reference No.: 88000646
- Added to NRHP: June 14, 1988

The Todd Block is a historic commercial and civic building at 27-31 Main Street in Hinsdale, New Hampshire. It consists of two separate buildings that were conjoined in 1895, creating an architecturally diverse structure. The front portion of the building is a 2 1/2-story wood-frame structure with Second Empire styling; it is only one of two commercial buildings built in that style in the town, and the only one still standing. It was built in 1862, and originally housed shops on the ground floor and residential apartments above. The front of the block has a full two-story porch, with turned posts, decorative brackets and frieze moulding. The corners of the building are pilastered, and the mansard roof is pierced by numerous pedimented dormers. The rear section of the building was built in 1895 as a hall for the local chapter of the Independent Order of Odd Fellows (IOOF). The principal feature of this three-story structure is its east facade, which has a richly decorated two-story Queen Anne porch.

The building was listed on the National Register of Historic Places in 1988. It is a rare local example of a mid-sized commercial building, and the IOOF hall is one of the largest structures to be built in the town in the late 19th century. It is the only surviving Second Empire commercial building in the town (one of only two built). It housed the town's first drugstore, and remained a center of the town's commerce into the mid-20th century. The drugstore closed in 1956, and the property was rehabilitated for primarily residential use in 1985, retaining a smaller storefront at the front of the building.

== See also ==
- National Register of Historic Places listings in Cheshire County, New Hampshire
