= Weldwood =

Historic house in New Hampshire, United States

- U.S. National Register of Historic Places
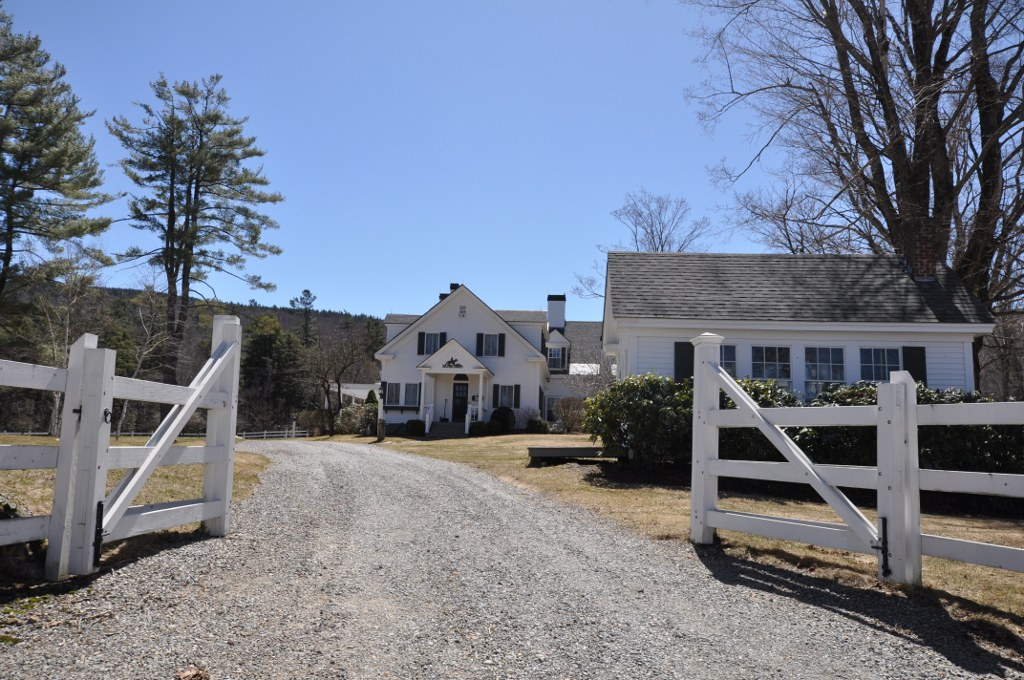

- Location within New Hampshire Location within the United States
- Location: Old Troy Rd., Dublin, New Hampshire
- Coordinates: 42°53′17″N 72°6′25″W
- Area: 1.4 acres (0.57 ha)
- Built: 1902
- Architectural style: Neo-Greek Revival
- MPS: Dublin MRA
- NRHP reference No.: 83004086
- Added to NRHP: December 15, 1983

Weldwood is a historic summer estate house on Old Troy Road in Dublin, New Hampshire. Built in 1902–03, it is an unusual example of Greek Revival architecture from the early 20th century. The house was listed on the National Register of Historic Places in 1983.

== Description and history ==
Weldwood is located in a rural setting of southwestern Dublin, on the south side of Old Troy Road about 1 mile (1.6 km) south of Old Marlborough Road. It is a 1 1/2-story wood-frame structure, with a gabled roof, two interior brick chimneys, and a clapboarded exterior. Its main facade is five bays wide, with a shed-roof porch extending across it, supported by round columns. Above the porch, three gabled dormers project from the main roof line. A secondary entrance is located on the street-facing north facade, sheltered by a gabled portico and topped by a half-round transom window. The building features corner pilasters and other Greek Revival features, possibly recycled from a farmhouse that previously stood on the property.

This land was settled about 1780 by Amos Emery, who built a farmhouse which stood nearby until 1900, when it was torn down. The present house was built in 1902-03 for George Weld, the brother-in-law of William Amory, who acquired extensive landholdings nearby for his summer estate. Weld operated a summer camp for boys on the property for a few years, and eventually gave it to his son Edric, later headmaster of the Holderness School, as a wedding present.

== See also ==
- National Register of Historic Places listings in Cheshire County, New Hampshire
