= Raubold House =

Historic house in New Hampshire, United States

- U.S. National Register of Historic Places
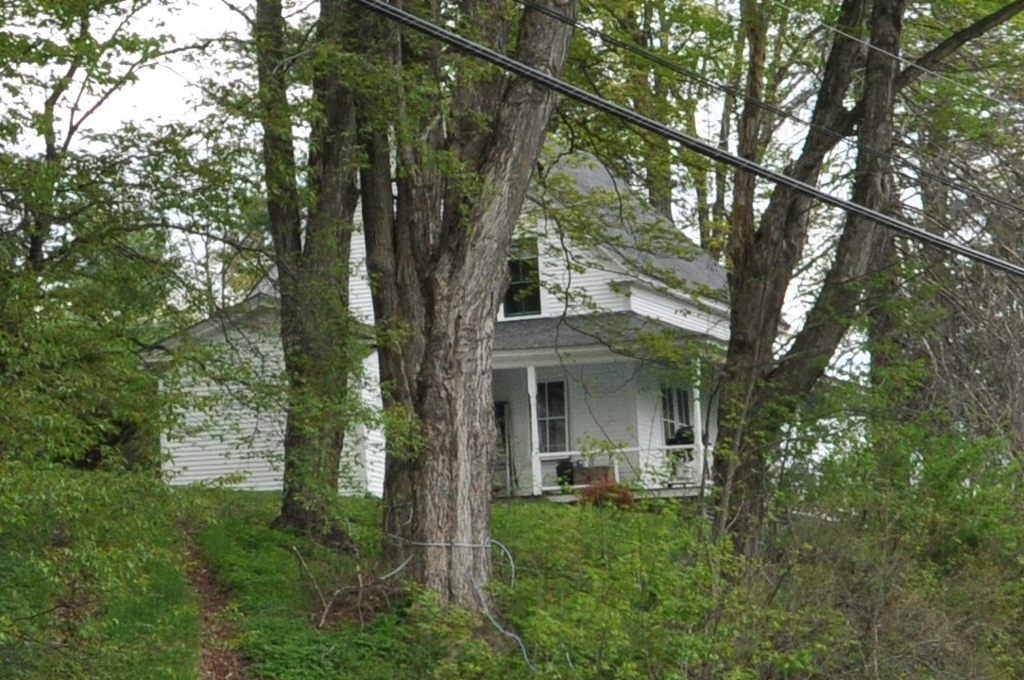

- Location within New Hampshire Location within the United States
- Location: North side of Chesham Rd., Harrisville, New Hampshire
- Coordinates: 42°56′41″N 72°6′14″W
- Area: 1.1 acres (0.45 ha)
- Built: 1901
- MPS: Harrisville MRA
- NRHP reference No.: 86003242
- Added to NRHP: January 14, 1988

The Raubold House is a historic house on Chesham Road in Harrisville, New Hampshire. Completed in 1901, it is a good example of a vernacular house built for immigrant mill workers. The house was listed on the National Register of Historic Places in 1988.

== Description and history ==
The Raubold House is located west of Harrisville's village center, set high on the north side of Chesham Road about 0.2 miles (0.32 km) west of its junction with Nelson Road. It is a two-story wood-frame structure, with a clapboarded exterior and gabled roof with short returns. A covered porch extends across the south and east facades, supported by turned posts.

This house was built in 1901. It is a modest worker's house of a sort typically built in the town for immigrants working either in the mills or at one of the local summer resort estates. Robert Raubold, its first owner, was a German immigrant who had jobs both at the Cheshire Mills and at Aldworth Manor. The next owner was his nephew, Alfred Dietze, who worked as a gardener at a Dublin estate. A later owner was the stationmaster at Harrisville's railroad station.

== See also ==
- National Register of Historic Places listings in Cheshire County, New Hampshire
