= Ivanov-Rinov House =

Historic house in New Hampshire, United States

- U.S. National Register of Historic Places
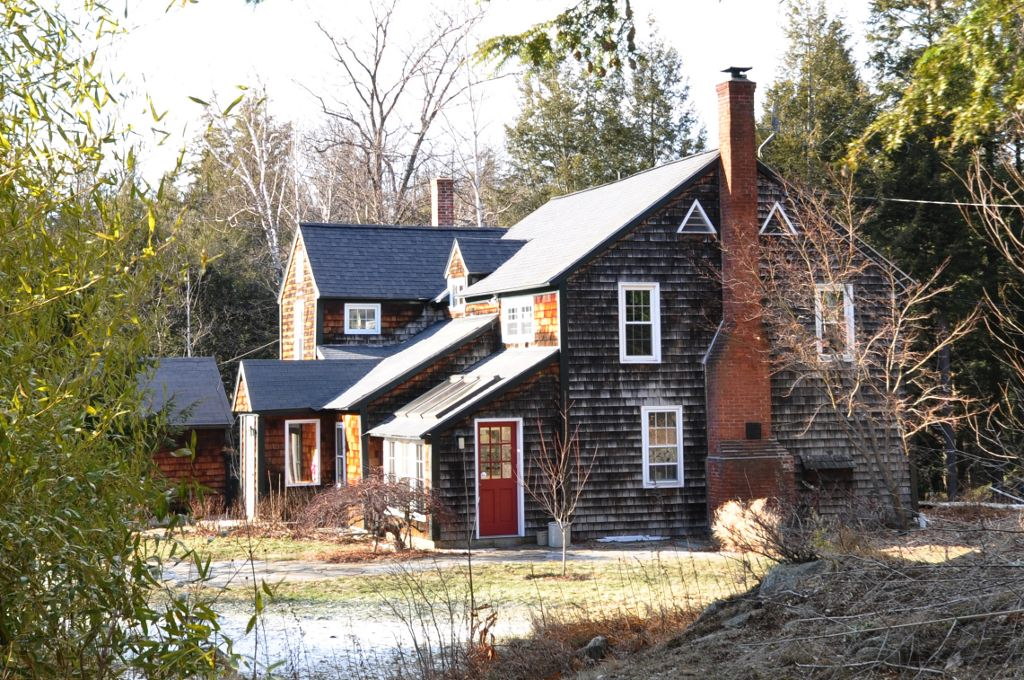

- Location within New Hampshire Location within the United States
- Location: Pierce Rd., Dublin, New Hampshire
- Coordinates: 42°53′58″N 72°2′34″W
- Area: 0.6 acres (0.24 ha)
- Built: 1937
- Architect: Ivanov-Rinov, G.
- MPS: Dublin MRA
- NRHP reference No.: 83004038
- Added to NRHP: December 18, 1983

The Ivanov-Rinov House is a historic house on Pierce Road in Dublin, New Hampshire, United States. This two-story house and studio was built over a twenty-year period beginning in 1937 by Gouri P. Ivanov-Rinov, an artist born in Russian Turkestan. The house features distinctive construction methods not usually found in New England, since they are based on those from his homeland. The main block is a square constructed of rammed earth, with a rear extension that is wood framed, which houses the kitchen and studio. The exterior is finished in a gray stucco-like material, with wood trim. The interior of the earth walls has recessed niches for the display of artwork. The rammed-earth construction is believed to be the only building of its type in New England. The house was listed on the National Register of Historic Places in 1983.

Gouri Ivanov-Rinov was the son of a Russian military officer, who followed his father into imperial Russian service, and fled to the United States after the Russian Revolution. He built the house on land given to him by another artist, Alexander James. He built the rammed earth section first, gradually adding to it features that give it flavor of a Russian dacha. He operated a summer art school here from 1945 until 1965. The house was sold of his family by 1977.

== See also ==
- National Register of Historic Places listings in Cheshire County, New Hampshire
