= Needham House =

Historic house in New Hampshire, United States

- U.S. National Register of Historic Places
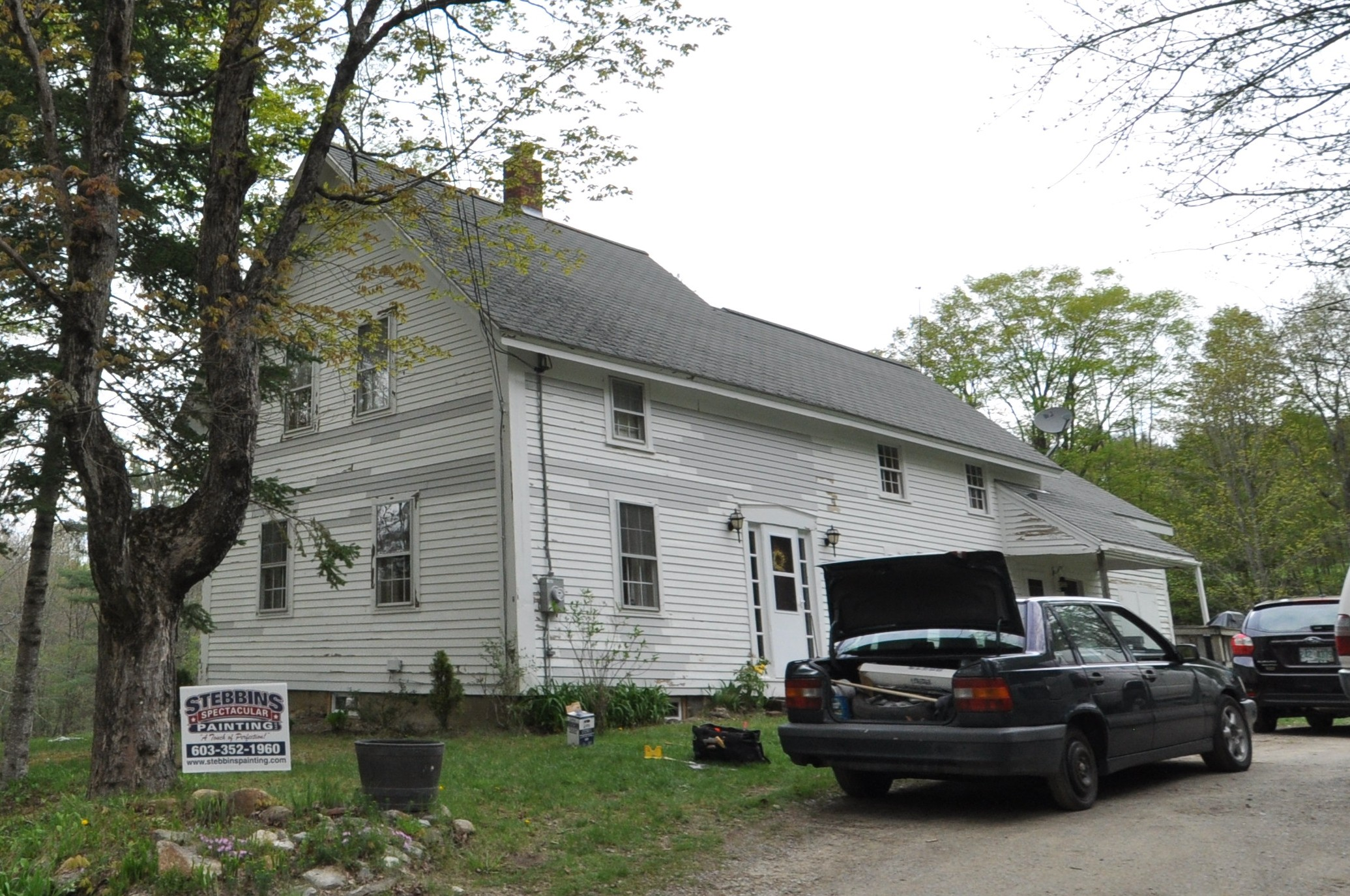

- Location within New Hampshire Location within the United States
- Location: Meadow Rd., Harrisville, New Hampshire
- Coordinates: 42°55′43″N 72°9′10″W
- Area: 1.2 acres (0.49 ha)
- Built: 1845
- Architectural style: Greek Revival
- MPS: Harrisville MRA
- NRHP reference No.: 86003254
- Added to NRHP: January 14, 1988

The Needham House is a historic house on Meadow Road near Chesham village in Harrisville, New Hampshire. Built in 1845, it is a modest but well-preserved local example of Greek Revival styling. The house was listed on the National Register of Historic Places in 1988.

== Description and history ==
The Needham House is located on the western fringe of Chesham village in western Harrisville, on the east side of Meadow Road a short way north of its junction with Chesham Road. It is a 2 1/2-story wood-frame structure, with a gabled roof and clapboarded exterior. It presents a side gable to the street, and its front facade faces east. That facade is two bays wide, but appears longer due to the presence of a 1 1/2-story ell whose facade is flush with that of the main block. The main entrance is the house's most elaborate Greek Revival feature, with full-length sidelight windows and a peaked lintel. The ell has a secondary entrance, sheltered by a shed-roof porch, and a second single-story ell extends further to the right.

The house was built in 1845 by John Needham, and is locally significant for its unusual entry styling. The house has been owned by a number of locally prominent families, including that of Prentiss Greenwood, a postmaster of the village of Pottersville.

== See also ==
- National Register of Historic Places listings in Cheshire County, New Hampshire
