= Lawrence Farm =

Historic house in New Hampshire, United States

- U.S. National Register of Historic Places
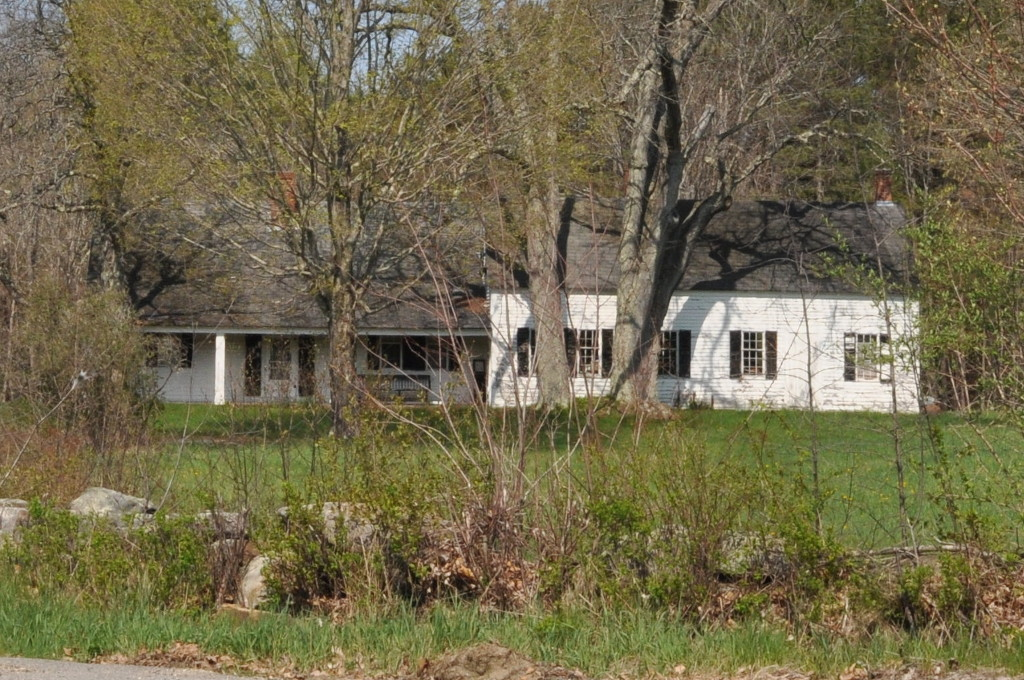

- Location within New Hampshire Location within the United States
- Location: 9 Lawrence Rd., Troy, New Hampshire
- Coordinates: 42°50′39″N 72°11′11″W
- Area: 46 acres (19 ha)
- Built: 1806
- Architectural style: Federal
- NRHP reference No.: 00000650
- Added to NRHP: June 9, 2000

The Lawrence Farm is a historic farm at 9 Lawrence Road (now effectively the driveway to the house off Marlborough Road) in Troy, New Hampshire. Established in the early 19th century, the property has been in continuous ownership by the same family since then. Its farmstead, including a c. 1806 farmhouse, exemplifies the changing trends in domestic agricultural practices of the 19th and 20th centuries. The farm was listed on the National Register of Historic Places in 2000.

== Description and history ==
The Lawrence Farm is located in a rural setting of northern Troy, occupying more than 100 acres (40 ha) of land on either side of Marlborough Road north of its junction with Old Keene Road. On the west side of Marlborough Road are 46 acres (19 ha) which form its historic core. This property includes a Federal-style farmhouse built c. 1806, a horsebarn c. 1870, and two smaller 20th-century outbuildings. The foundations of an older barn, which was historically attached to the house, remain.

Land that now makes up the farm was first occupied about 1783, when a log house was built by Joseph Parker. After passing through several owners, it was purchased by Silas Wheeler in 1806. He is credited with building the oldest portion of the farmhouse, on the site of the original log house. Lawrence Road, now fractured by unmaintained stream crossings, ran from the house to a mill Wheeler also owned. The Wheeler property was purchased in 1845 by George Lawrence. Lawrence expanded the landholdings of the farm, and also expanded the house, adding an ell to make room for his family, as well as his widowed mother and spinster sister. Lawrence was a successful farmer, and one of Troy's wealthiest residents at the time of his death. His descendants have continued to own the land, leasing the fields to local farmers.

== See also ==
- National Register of Historic Places listings in Cheshire County, New Hampshire
