= The Acre =

Historic house in New Hampshire, United States

- U.S. National Register of Historic Places
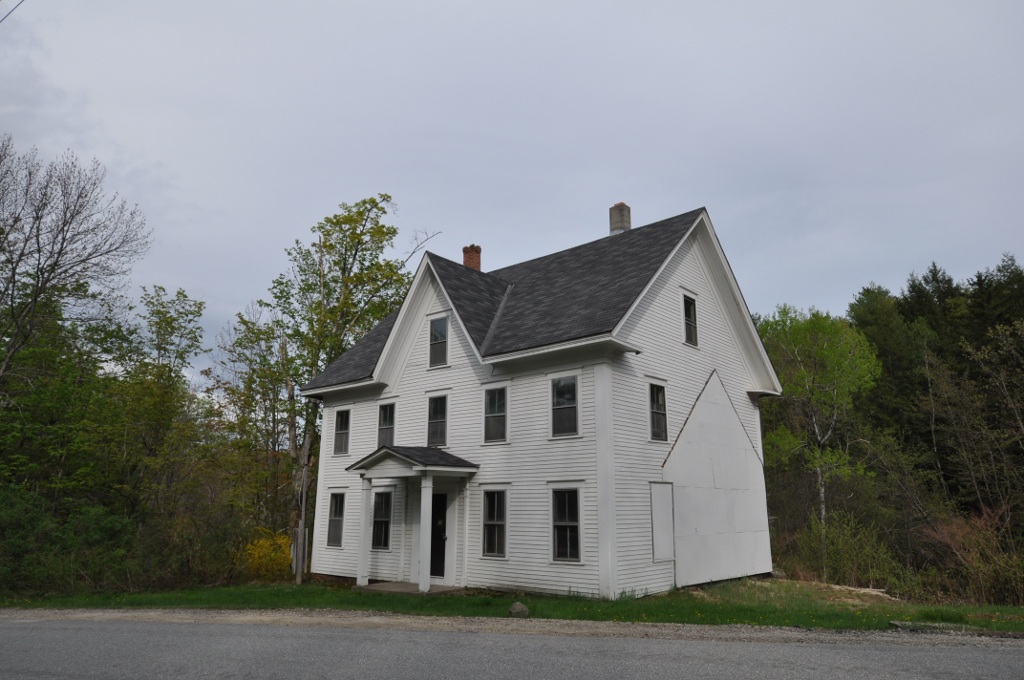

- Location within New Hampshire Location within the United States
- Location: S of lower Harrisville village at Main St. and Dublin Rd., Harrisville, New Hampshire
- Coordinates: 42°56′12″N 72°5′30″W
- Area: 0.4 acres (0.16 ha)
- Built: 1879
- Architect: Cheshire Mills Co.
- Architectural style: Greek Revival
- MPS: Harrisville MRA
- NRHP reference No.: 86003257
- Added to NRHP: January 14, 1988

The Acre is a historic house at the corner of Main Street and Dublin Road in Harrisville, New Hampshire. Built about 1880 by the Cheshire Mill Company, it is a good example of period worker housing constructed by the company for itinerant workers. The house was listed on the National Register of Historic Places in 1988.

== Description and history ==
The Acre is located south of the industrial village center of Harrisville, at the northeast corner of Main Street and Dublin Road. It is a 2 1/2-story wood-frame structure, with a gabled roof and clapboarded exterior. Its gable ends have short returns in the Greek Revival style, and there is an Italianate-style gabled wall dormer at the center of the main street-facing facade. That facade is five bays wide, with sash windows arranged symmetrically around the main entrance.

The entrance is sheltered by a portico with a low-pitch gabled roof, and is flanked by pilasters. The house was originally attached via a connecting ell to a barn; both of these structures have been removed, leaving a flushboard outline of the ell on the right wall.

The house was built in 1879 or 1880 by the Cheshire Mill Company, the major operator of Harrisville's mills, for itinerant construction workers. Its name is taken from a trend in mill communities to name the mundane areas where such quarters were located as "The Acre".

Local historical traditions state that the house was occupied by workers on the railroad link that brought the mill's products to market. The house is locally distinctive as an unusually late example of the Greek Revival, and for its unusual front gable.

== See also ==
- National Register of Historic Places listings in Cheshire County, New Hampshire
