= Capt. Thomas Morse Farm =

Historic house in New Hampshire, United States

- U.S. National Register of Historic Places
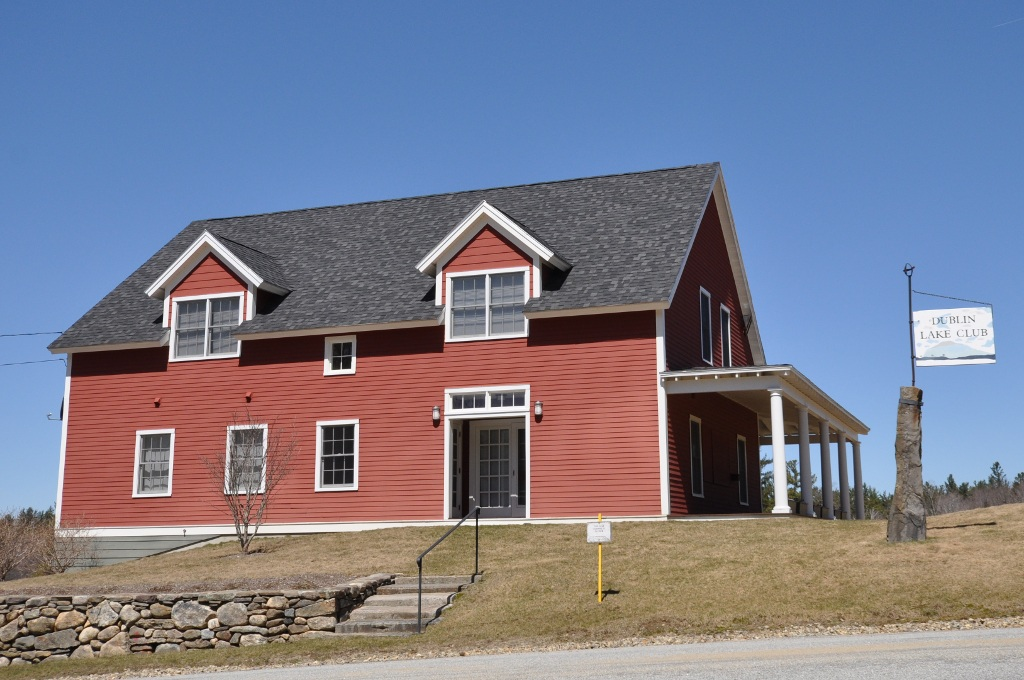
- Probably a replacement structure

- Location within New Hampshire Location within the United States
- Location: Old Marlborough Rd., Dublin, New Hampshire
- Coordinates: 42°54′1″N 72°6′22″W
- Area: 0.6 acres (0.24 ha)
- Architectural style: Colonial Cape
- MPS: Dublin MRA
- NRHP reference No.: 83004055
- Added to NRHP: December 15, 1983

The Capt. Thomas Morse Farm is (or was) a historic farmhouse on Old Marlborough Road in Dublin, New Hampshire. It is a small 1 1/2-story two-room cottage, similar to other early period Cape style farmhouses in the town and probably built in the late 18th century by one of the town's first settlers. Now a clubhouse for the Dublin Lake Golf Club, it is one of the few buildings from that period to survive. The house was listed on the National Register of Historic Places in 1983. It appears to have been torn down and replaced by a more modern structure.

== Description and history ==
The Capt. Thomas Morse Farm house is located in a rural setting west of Dublin Pond, on the north side of Old Marlborough Road near its junction with Old Troy Road. It is a 1 1/2-story wood-frame structure, with a gabled roof and clapboarded exterior. Its main facade, oriented north toward the road, is three bays wide, with a center entrance flanked by sash windows. The entry is topped by a four-light transom window, and the enter facade is sheltered by a shed-roof porch supported by Ionic columns. A two-story porch extends along the right (east) facade. It stands on the property of the Dublin Lake Golf Club, serving as a clubhouse.

The house is a surviving wing of a much larger house built by Dublin's first permanent English settler, Thomas Morse. That house was "a two-story mansion" according to a local historian, and was probably demolished sometime between 1865, when it was sold out of the Morse family, and 1909, when it was acquired for use by the golf club. The Morse owners of the property include several men active in civic affairs, and a veteran of the American Revolutionary War. In 1885 it was acquired by Livingston Stone, one of the pioneers of the summer colony movement in Dublin. He gave it to Louis Amory, who donated it to the Dublin Lake Club for establishment of the golf course.

== See also ==
- National Register of Historic Places listings in Cheshire County, New Hampshire
