= Fisk Barn =

- U.S. National Register of Historic Places
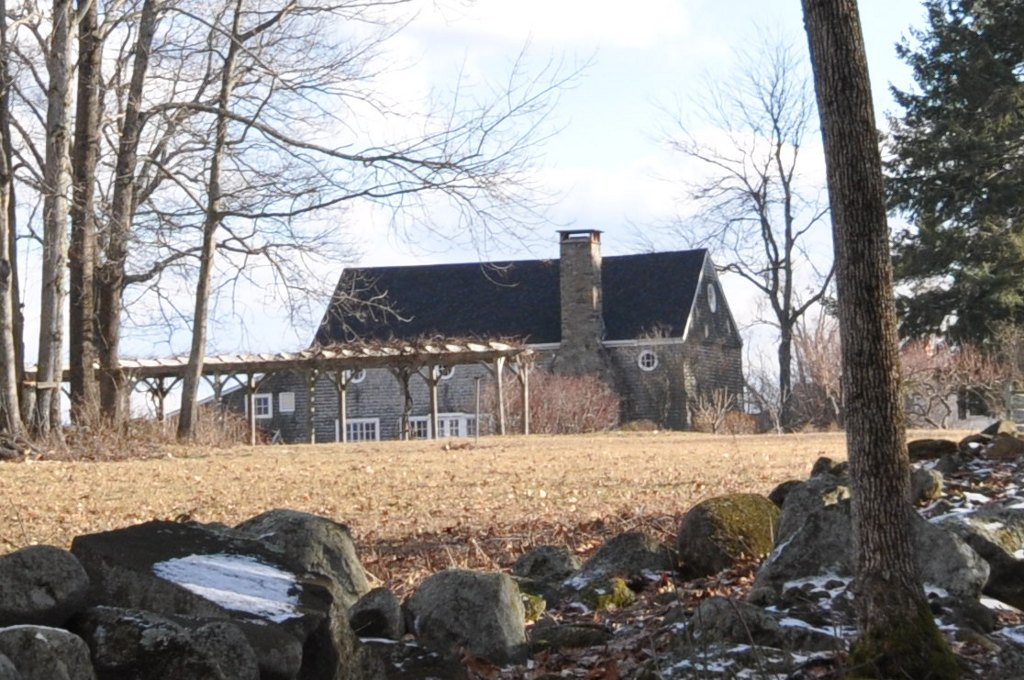

- Location within New Hampshire Location within the United States
- Location: Gerry Rd., Dublin, New Hampshire
- Coordinates: 42°53′38″N 72°1′42″W
- Area: 0.6 acres (0.24 ha)
- Built: 1795
- Built by: Samuel Fisk
- Architect: Albert Harkness (1929 remodel)
- MPS: Dublin MRA
- NRHP reference No.: 83004024
- Added to NRHP: December 18, 1983

The Fisk Barn is a historic barn on Gerry Road in Dublin, New Hampshire, United States. Built in the 1790s, it is a good local example of 18th-century farm architecture, made further notable by its conversion to an art studio in 1929, during Dublin's heyday as an artists' colony. The barn was listed on the National Register of Historic Places in 1983.

== Description and history ==
The Fisk Barn is located in eastern Dublin, in a small farm complex at the southern end of Gerry Road. It is a long rectangular two-story wooden structure, with a gabled roof and shingled exterior. A variety of window and door treatments appear on the sides, including a pair of full-height windowed doors on one side, and oculus windows on the second level. A Cape style farmhouse with large central chimney stands nearby, and the grounds are landscaped with walls resembling those of old foundations.

The barn was probably built in the 1790s by Samuel Fisk, who lived nearby and farmed the land. The barn remained in his family's hands until the late 19th century. In 1929 it was converted to an art studio under the guidance of Providence, Rhode Island, architect Albert Harkness. The building is thus representative of Dublin's early agricultural origins and its later period as an artists' colony.

== See also ==
- National Register of Historic Places listings in Cheshire County, New Hampshire
