= Dr. Daniel Adams House =

Historic house in New Hampshire, United States

- U.S. National Register of Historic Places
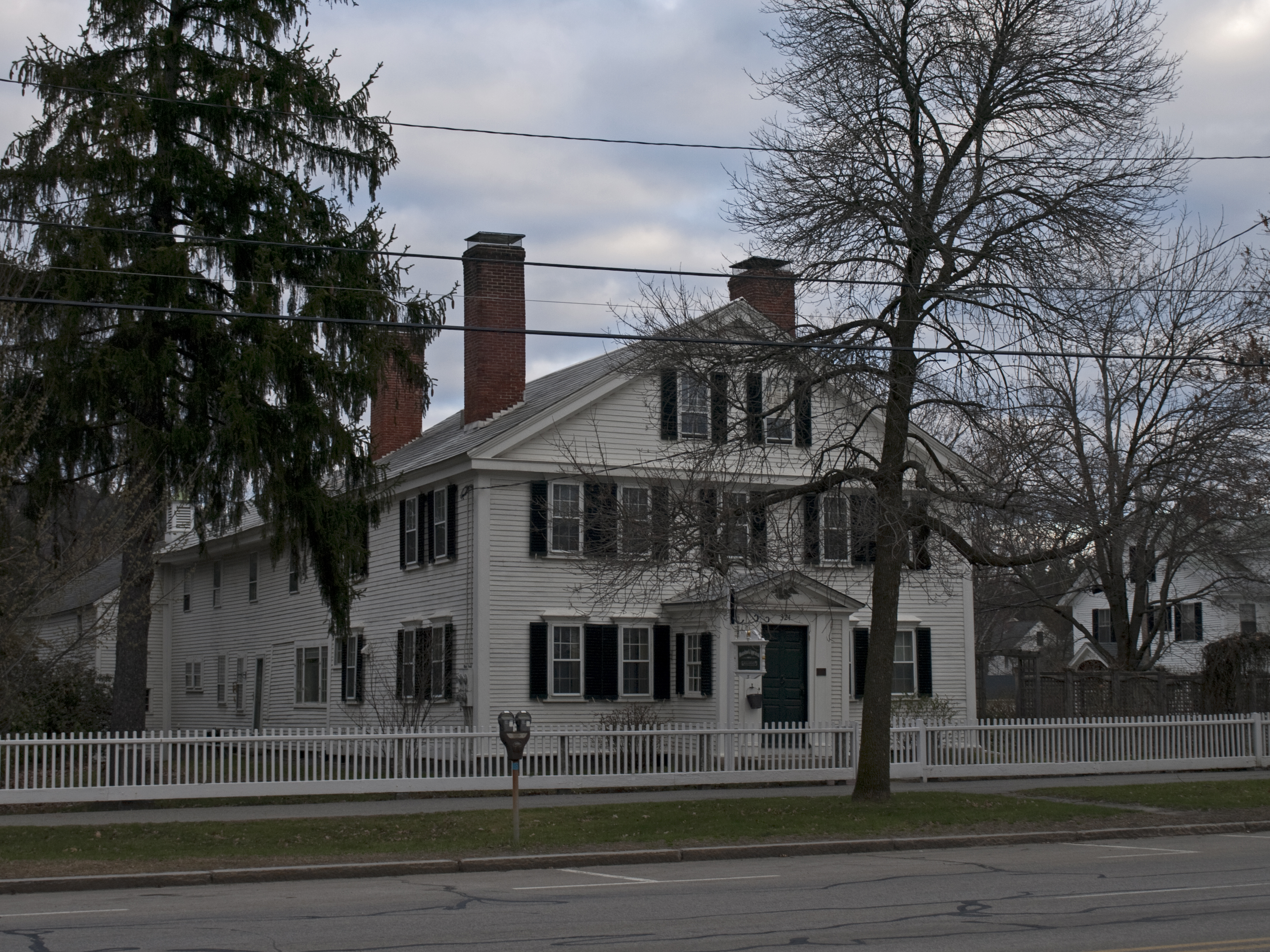

- Location within New Hampshire Location within the United States
- Location: 324 Main St., Keene, New Hampshire
- Coordinates: 42°55′30″N 72°16′38″W
- Area: 0.5 acres (0.20 ha)
- Built: 1795
- Architectural style: Greek Revival, Federal
- NRHP reference No.: 89000449
- Added to NRHP: June 8, 1989

The Dr. Daniel Adams House is a historic house at 324 Main Street in Keene, New Hampshire. Built about 1795, it is a good example of transitional Federal-Greek Revival architecture, with a well documented history of alterations by its first owner. The house was listed on the National Register of Historic Places in 1989.

== Description and history ==
The Dr. Daniel Adams House is located south of downtown Keene, on the east side of Main Street at its junction with Gates Road. It is a 2½-story wood-frame structure, with a front-facing gabled roof, four interior chimneys, and clapboarded exterior. It is predominantly Greek Revival in styling, with a five-bay front facade topped by a pedimented gable, in which there are two small sash windows. The front entry is sheltered by what was formerly a porch, but is now an enclosed vestibule with gabled roof. A two-story ell extends to the rear of the main block. There are significant surviving Federal-style details on the interior.

The house was built about 1795 by Doctor Daniel Adams, a prominent local physician who also served as the town postmaster for a time. Adams undertook a number of alterations, restylings, and enlargements of the house prior to his death in 1830. His son, also a doctor, is probably responsible for the conversion of its original hip roof to the gabled one seen today. Its only major alteration since then was the addition of a bay window on the north side during the Victorian period, and the enclosing of the entry porch in the 20th century.

== See also ==
- National Register of Historic Places listings in Cheshire County, New Hampshire
