= Jabez Townsend House =

Historic house in New Hampshire, United States

- U.S. National Register of Historic Places
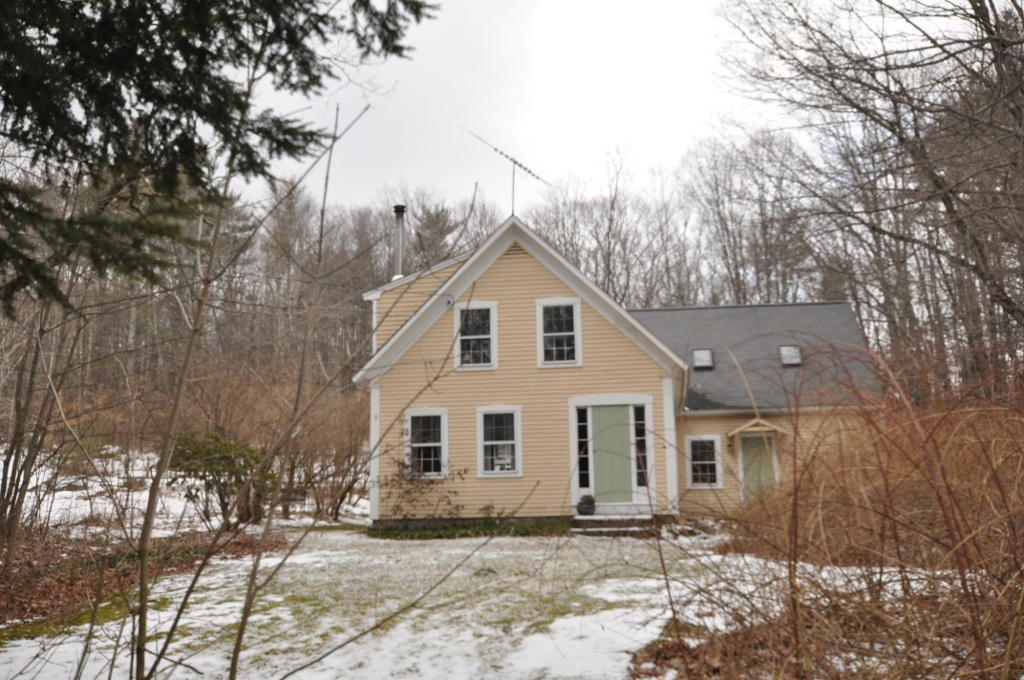

- Location within New Hampshire Location within the United States
- Location: Hancock and Cherry Hill Rds., Harrisville, New Hampshire
- Coordinates: 42°55′48″N 72°2′15″W
- Area: 1 acre (0.40 ha)
- Built: 1853
- Architectural style: Greek Revival
- MPS: Harrisville MRA
- NRHP reference No.: 86003107
- Added to NRHP: January 14, 1988

The Jabez Townsend House is a historic house at the southwest corner of Hancock and Cherry Hill Roads in Harrisville, New Hampshire. Built in 1853, it is a good local example of a rural Greek Revival farmhouse. The house was listed on the National Register of Historic Places in 1988.

== Description and history ==
The Jabez Townsend House is located in eastern Harrisville, on the west side of Cherry Hill Road just south of its junction with Hancock Road. It is a 1 1/2-story L-shaped wood-frame structure, with a gabled roof and clapboarded exterior. Its main block is rectangular, with single-story ells extending to the rear and right. Its main facade is three bays wide, with the entrance in the rightmost bay, flanked by sidelight windows and pilasters, and topped by a peaked architrave. The windows on the facade have similarly peaked lintels. A secondary entrance is set in an ell projecting to the right side from the rear of the main block; it is sheltered by a gabled hood.

The house was built in 1853 by Jabez Townsend, whose family had long owned property in the area. It was part of a once-flourishing community known as Eastview, and Lewis Farwell, the last postmaster of the village, lived here. It is notable as one of a relatively small number of houses built in Harrisville's more rural settings during a period of population decline in those areas.

== See also ==
- National Register of Historic Places listings in Cheshire County, New Hampshire
