= Zedekiah (name) =

- Pronunciation: /ˌzɛdɪˈkaɪə/ ZED-ih-KY-ə
- Gender: Male

Origin
- Origin: Hebrew
- Meaning: "God is my righteousness"
- Region of origin: Southern Levant

Zedekiah (Hebrew: צדקיהו, romanized: Ṣiḏqiyyāhû, lit. 'God is my righteousness') is a masculine given name of Hebrew origins. It is most commonly associated with Zedekiah (c. 618 BC–after 586 BC), a Biblical figure and the last monarch of the Kingdom of Judah. The name is also used by the following:

== People with the given name Zedekiah ==
- Zedekiah (High Priest), High Priest of Solomon's Temple
- Zedekiah Smith Barstow (1790–1873), American minister of the Congregational church.
- Zedekiah Belknap (1781–1858), American portraitist
- Zedekiah ben Abraham Anaw, 13th-century Italian author of Halakhic works
- Zedekiah Kidwell (1814–1872), 19th-century American politician, physician, lawyer, teacher and clerk
- Zedekiah Otieno (born 1968), Kenyan footballer
- Zedekiah Johnson Purnell (1813–1882), African-American activist, businessman, and literary editor.

== Other uses ==
- Zedekiah's Cave, an underground meleke limestone quarry, under the Muslim Quarter of the Old City of Jerusalem.
