= Wyman Tavern =

Historic tavern in New Hampshire, United States

- U.S. National Register of Historic Places
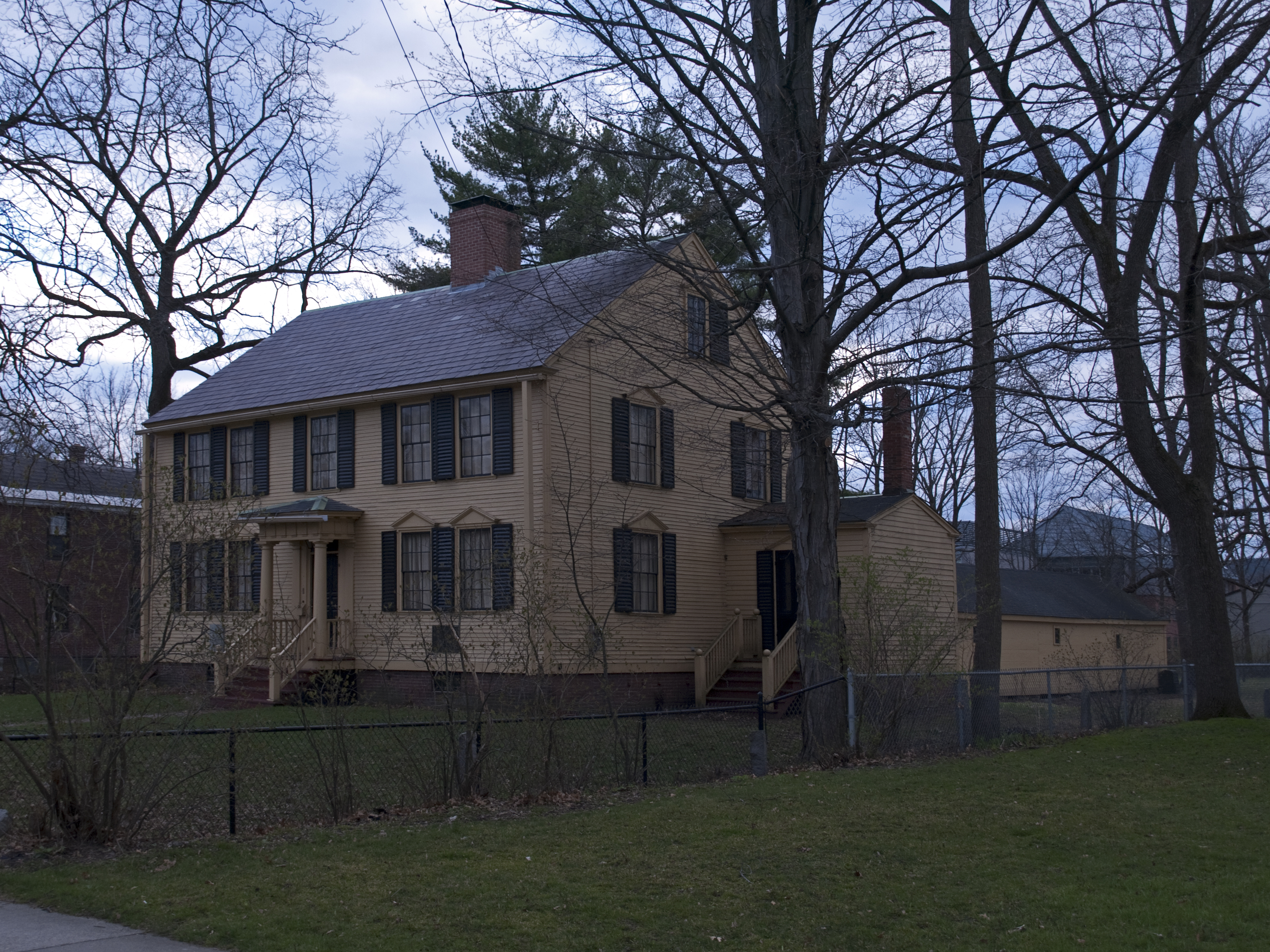

- Location within New Hampshire Location within the United States
- Location: 339 Main St., Keene, New Hampshire
- Coordinates: 42°55′30″N 72°16′42″W
- Area: 1 acre (0.40 ha)
- Built: 1762
- NRHP reference No.: 72000106
- Added to NRHP: April 3, 1972

The Wyman Tavern is a historic house, former tavern, and now a local history museum, at 339 Main Street in Keene, New Hampshire. Built in 1762 by Isaac Wyman, it also served as the muster ground for militia at the outbreak of the American Revolutionary War. In 1968 the property was acquired by a local non-profit, which leases it to the Cheshire County Historical Society for use as a museum. The building was listed on the National Register of Historic Places in 1972.

== Description and history ==
The Wyman Tavern is located south of downtown Keene, on the west side of Main Street nearly adjacent to the campus of Keene State College. It is a 2 1/2-story wood-frame structure, with a gabled roof, clapboarded exterior, and central brick chimney. Its main facade is five bays wide, with sash windows arranged symmetrically around the center entrance. Second-story windows butt against the eave, while those on the ground floor are topped by peaked lintels. The entry is sheltered by a hip-roofed portico supported by round columns. The interior follows a typical center-chimney plan, with a narrow entrance vestibule that has a tight winding staircase. The interior shows exposed hand-hewn timbers and Federal period paneling. There are two single-story ells, both apparently added in the early 19th century.

The house was built in 1762 by Isaac Wyman, a veteran of the French and Indian War, who operated a tavern on the premises for 30 years. In 1770 the first meeting of the trustees of Dartmouth College was held here, an event that was repeated in celebration of the school's bicentennial in 1970. For more than 50 years in the 19th century it was home to Reverend Zedekiah Barstow, the last town-funded minister in Keene. In addition to his role as minister, Barstow also held a private school here, which numbered Salmon P. Chase among its students. The building was acquired by a local non-profit and converted into a museum in 1968.

== See also ==
- National Register of Historic Places listings in Cheshire County, New Hampshire
