= New Hampshire State Hospital =

Psychiatric hospital in Concord, United States (1842–1989)

Coordinates: 43°11′56″N 71°32′43″W

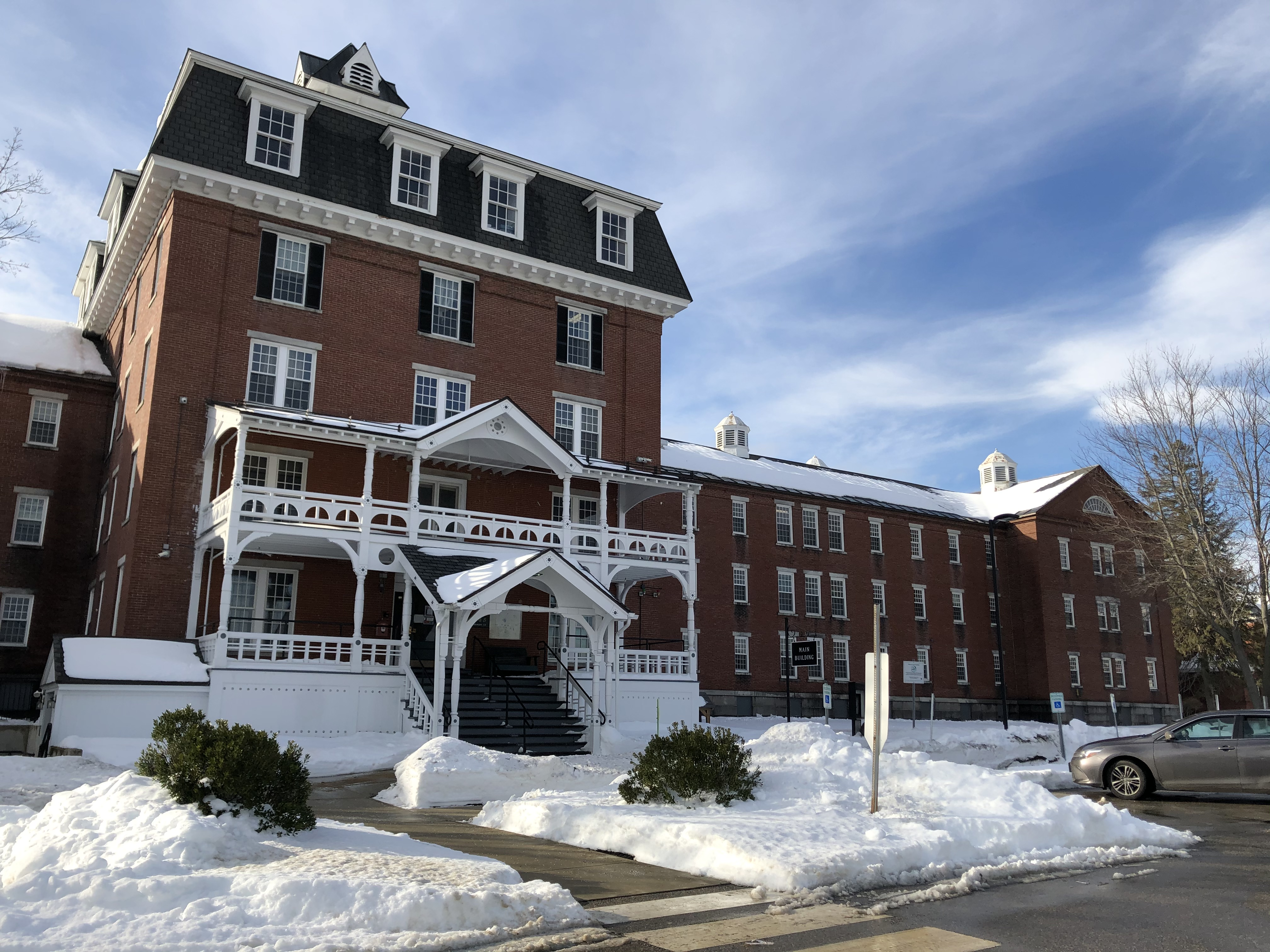
The Main Building, constructed in 1842

The New Hampshire State Hospital was originally constructed in 1842 in Concord, New Hampshire, as the seventeenth mental institution in the country and the seventh in New England to cater to the state's mentally ill population. Planning for the institution began in 1830, and later the New Hampshire Legislature chartered the New Hampshire Asylum for the Insane in 1838. The name of the institution later changed to the New Hampshire State Hospital.

== History ==
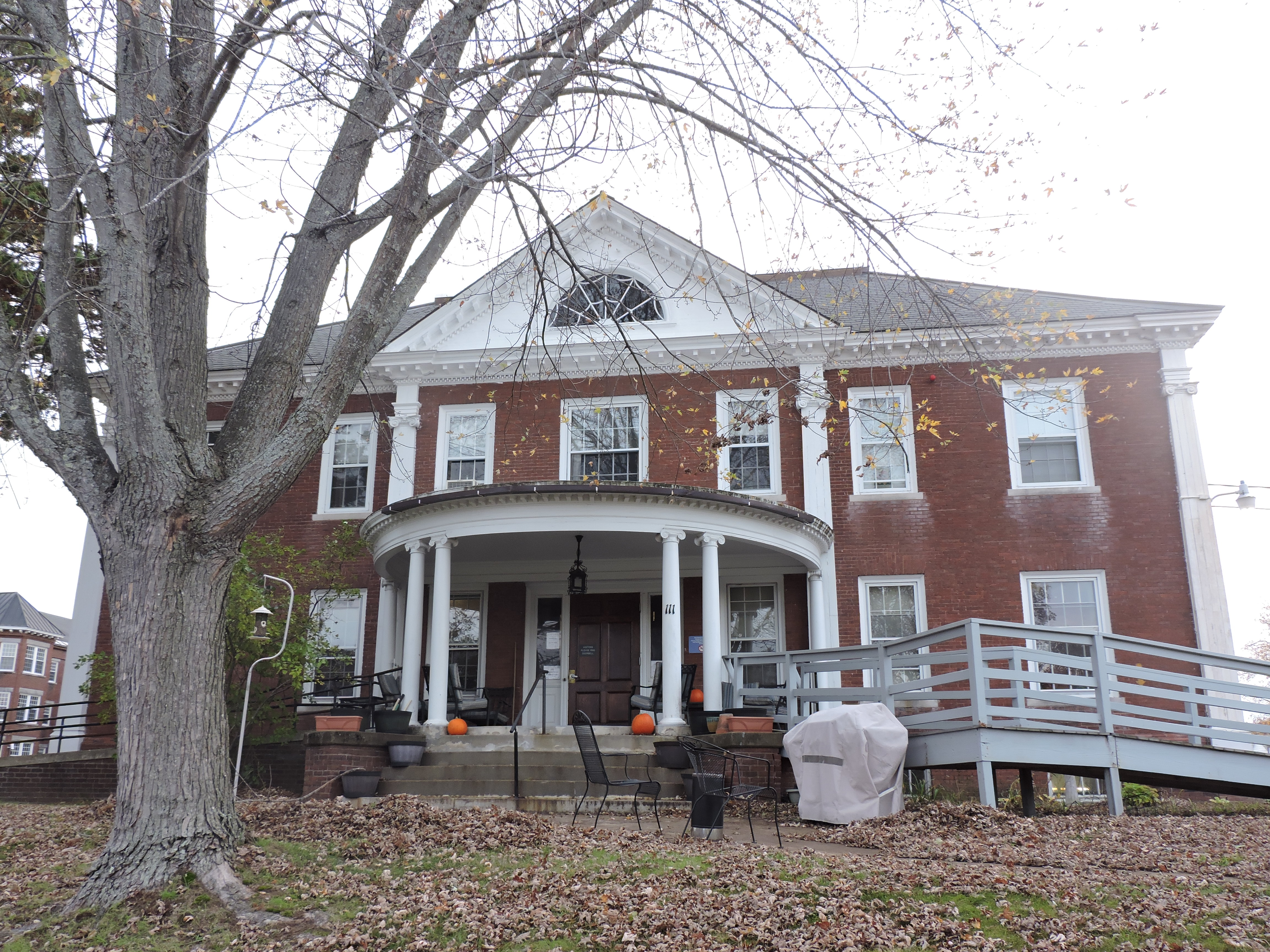
Twitchell House

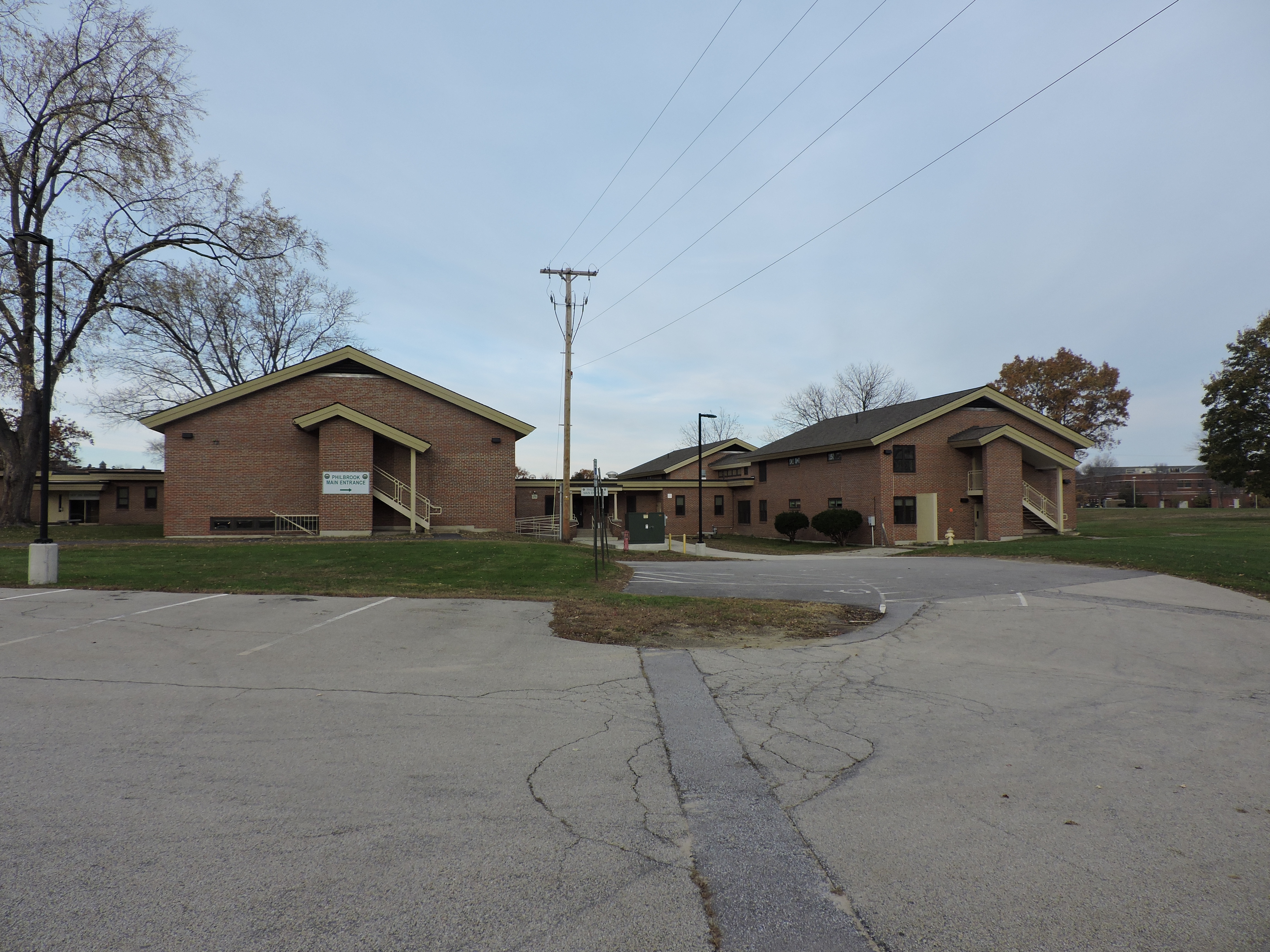
The Anna L. Philbrook Center (1960)

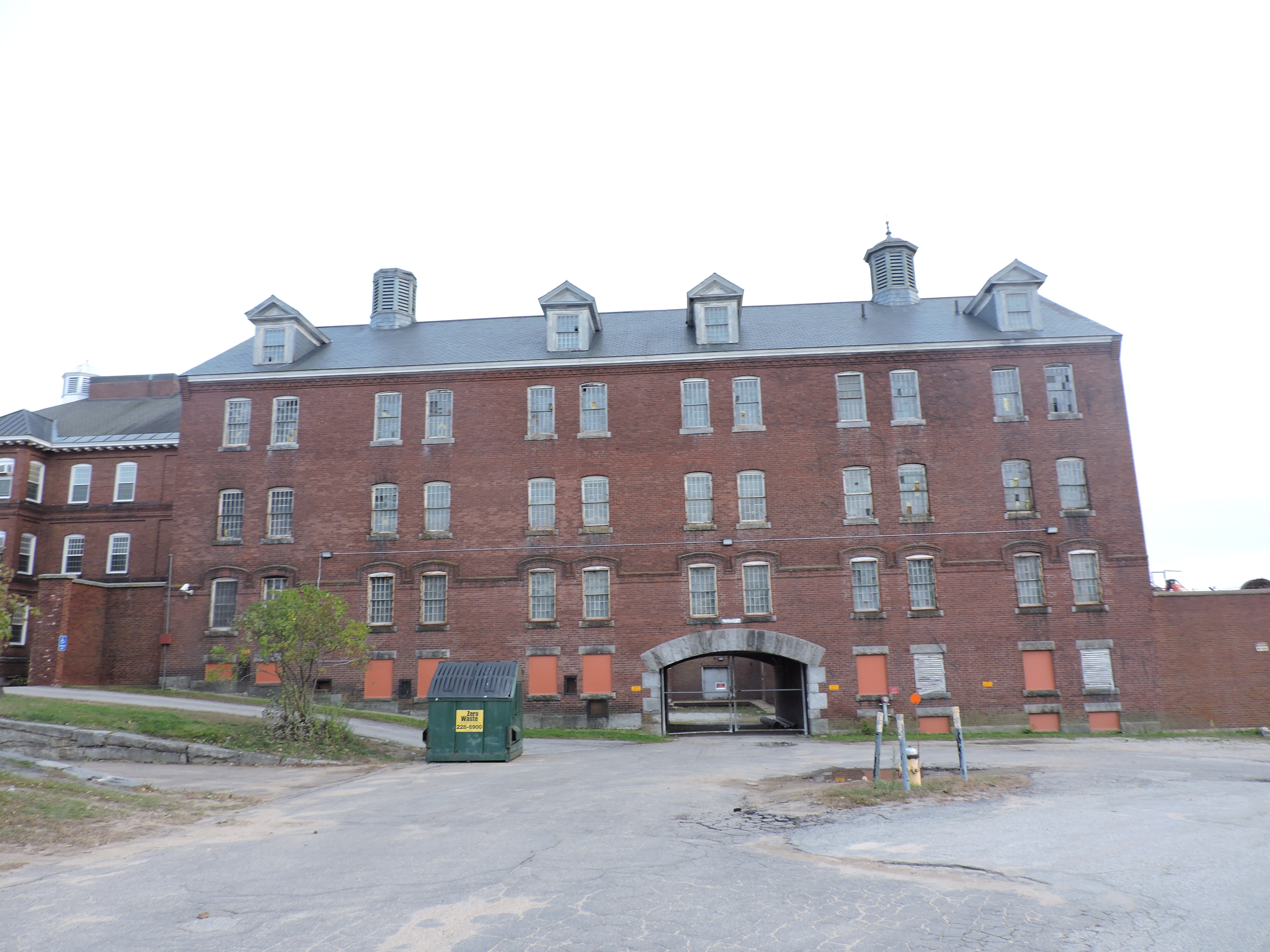
The Peaslee Annex for male patients

=== The Founding of the Hospital ===
In 1830, local and state officials in New Hampshire decided that the state should take initiative in adopting measures to confront and care for the insane. In June 1832, Governor Samuel Dinsmore remarked on the condition of the insane, stating, "I feel no apology need be made, in an age so distinguished for its public and private charities, for calling your attention to a subject which has so much reason and humanity on its side as a measure for the security and recovery of the lunatic or insane. The Legislature of the state has never yet recognized these unfortunate beings as entitled to any special favor from the government."

Dinsmore recommended the solution of an institution to house the insane: "To ascertain with as much exactness as practicable, the whole number of the insane within the state, distinguishing paupers from others, the number which have been committed to jail within a given time by authority of court, or by their friends or by others, without the order or sanction of judicial proceedings, and the length of their respective terms of confinement; and to ascertain, in like manner, the actual or probable amount of cost of court and jailers' fees, and expenses of their support and maintenance in cases of confinement."

Per the Governor's recommendation, the New Hampshire House of Representatives saw a bill "For the establishment of the New Hampshire Asylum for the Insane." On December 28 of 1832, the bill was indefinitely postponed by a vote of 139 to 78. In 1833, upon the assembly of the next Legislature, Governor Dinsmore brought the issue of an institution up again: "Although your predecessors did not feel prepared to sanction the measures recommended, I have never lost the hope of seeing at an early period zealous cooperation of the several branches of the government with the friends of suffering humanity in promoting a charity so plainly recommended by the principles of our religion and by every consideration of justice and philanthropy."

On June 20, 1833, a resolution was introduced in the House of Representatives that authorized the appointment of an agent to examine and inspect sundry asylums for the insane and to "report a plan for an asylum in this state." Passed, the resolution went to the Senate, and its further consideration was postponed until the next meeting of the Legislature.

At the beginning of the 1834 Legislature session, Governor William Badger urged the committee to take measures to help the insane. "A resolution for an appropriation by the state of the sum of $812,500 for the erection of an asylum for the insane" was postponed once again. A resolution was later passed requiring the selected men of several towns to give the Secretary of State the number and condition of the insane in their respective districts.

In 1835, a resolution was introduced appropriating 25 bank shares for the creation of the asylum but was defeated. In 1836, a committee was appointed to report on such portions of the governor's message as referred to as provision for the insane. Upon the occasion of a resolution appropriating bank shares for the erection of an asylum, a resolution passed that directed the Governor to take the sense of the qualified voters of the state upon the question, "Is it expedient for the state to grant an appropriation to build an insane hospital?" At the next session of the Legislature, it was found that less than one-half the voters of the state had expressed any opinion, and the bills as far as received indicated that there was no decided majority in favor of the step. For a year, no effort was made to agitate the question.

=== Construction History ===
It began simply with the main administration building with two symmetrical wings: the female ward to the left and the male ward to the right. In 1892, Dr. Charles Bancroft had the Bancroft Building constructed as a residential dormitory for female patients. The mansion used European-style architecture to create a more homelike feel for patients. The Twitchell House was built two years later in 1894 for the same reason but for male patients.

In 1899, a nurses' annex was built to accommodate the facilities' growing number of staff members. Before 1899, the nurses lived on patient wards during their shift intervals. This new nurses' home was connected to the Bancroft Building and the Main Administration Building via tunnel-esque hallways that allowed for easy travel.

In 1907, a new medical surgical building named the Thayer Building was constructed adjacent to the Main Administration Building. It provided the space for routine surgeries as well as sterilizations, which were commonplace during New Hampshire's eugenics movement.

More institutional buildings like the Walker Building (built between 1913 and 1917), the Brown Building (1924), and the Tobey Building (1930) provided compact housing as the hospital population spiked dramatically. The Brown Building was built to house female patients, while Tobey was constructed to house male patients. Brown continued to house patients until 1989, when they were transferred to the newly built facility on the same property, New Hampshire Hospital.

1941 brought about the construction of a new geriatric facility, the Dolloff Building, named for Dr. Charles Dolloff. The Thayer Building was converted into geriatric housing in the 1950s when the population of elderly increased/ In 1960, the Philbrook Center was brought to fruition in the name of Dr. Anna L. Philbrook. Philbrook pioneered adolescent psychiatry and championed the addition of a separate facility for the care of mentally disturbed youths.

== Modern use ==
The facility closed its doors in 1989 and all services were moved to the new, state-of-the-art hospital, named the New Hampshire Hospital. The former buildings became state offices, with a large number of organizations operating out of the former hospital campus. The Bancroft Building, however, remains abandoned, as well as the Kent Annex and Peaslee Annex wings of the Main Administration Building.

== November 2023 shooting ==
On November 17, 2023, a shooting occurred at the hospital resulting in the death of a security guard and the shooter. 33-year-old John Madore of Concord, who previously lived at a Seacoast Region hotel, was identified the following day by police as the shooter.

After parking a U-Haul truck, he allegedly entered the hospital’s lobby armed with a 9-mm pistol. At 3:40pm he shot a hospital security guard, 63-year-old Bradley Haas of Franklin, who was administered cardiopulmonary resuscitation on the scene but was later pronounced dead after being transferred to Concord Hospital. Many local politicians reacted to the shooting, including Governor Chris Sununu who said "He [Bradley Haas] will be remembered for his heroism and decades of public service."

The suspect, who was homeless, was shot and killed by Trooper Nathan Sleight who was assigned to an overtime shift at the hospital at the time. Although troopers were not routinely assigned to the hospital, the state office complex police, which falls under the New Hampshire Department of Safety was facing critical staffing issues due to low pay and poor benefits. There was also an alleged “suspicious vehicle” in the vicinity, which was investigated by the bomb squad, and found not to contain explosives. Officers found an assault-style rifle, body armor, and more ammunition in his rented truck.

== Notable people ==
- Catherine Fiske (1764-1837), benefactor
