= Cheshire County Courthouse =

- U.S. National Register of Historic Places
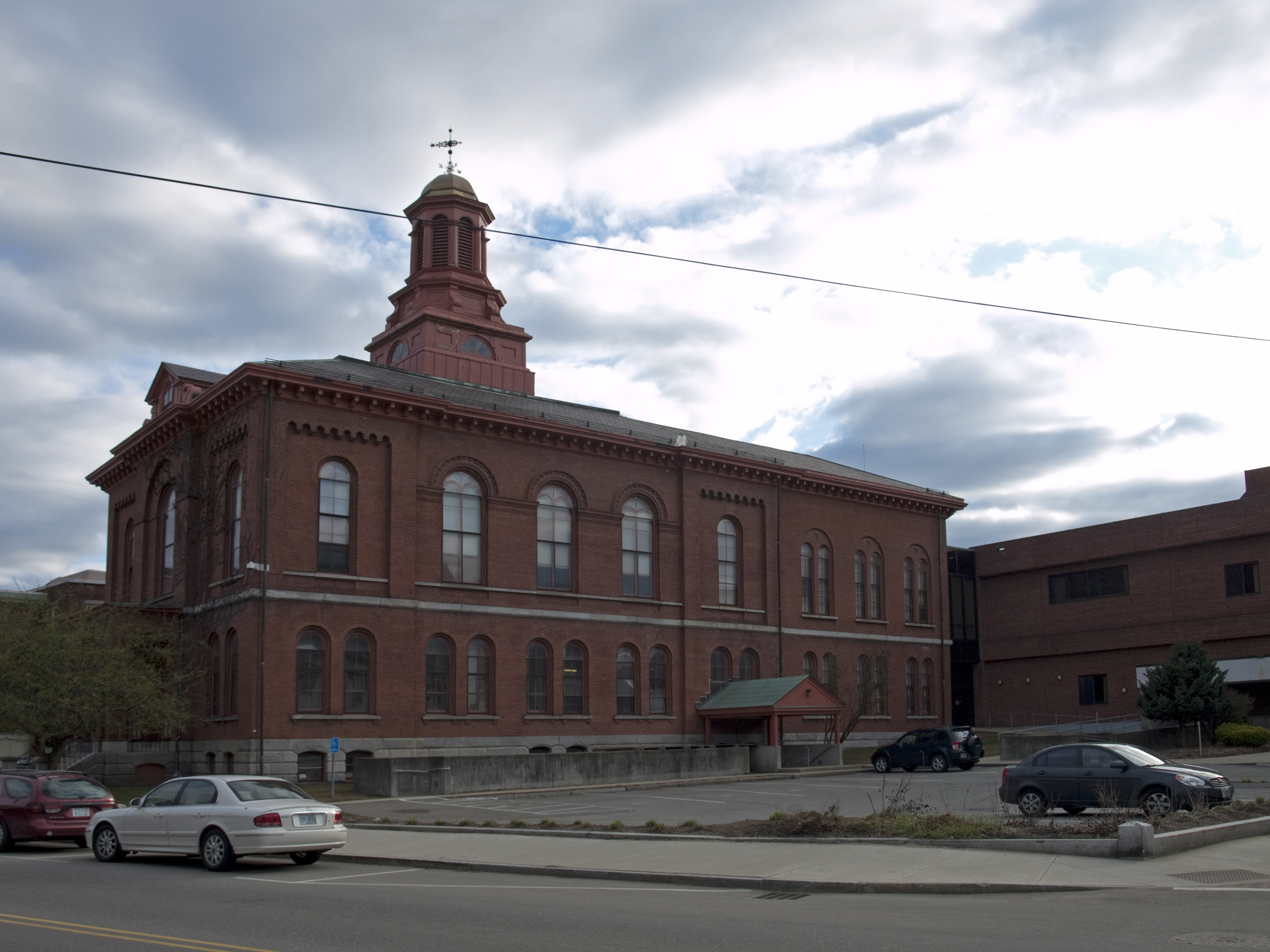

- Location within New Hampshire Location within the United States
- Interactive map showing the location of Cheshire County Courthouse
- Location: 12 Court St., Keene, New Hampshire
- Coordinates: 42°56′3″N 72°16′48″W
- Area: less than one acre
- Built: 1858–59
- Built by: Bullard, Joel
- Architect: Bryant, Gridley James Fox
- NRHP reference No.: 78000210
- Added to NRHP: December 13, 1978

The Cheshire County Courthouse, located at 12 Court Street in Keene, New Hampshire, is the center of government of Cheshire County, New Hampshire. Completed in 1859 to a design by Gridley James Fox Bryant, it is believed to be the oldest courthouse in regular use in the state. It was added to the National Register of Historic Places on December 13, 1978.

== Description and history ==
The Cheshire County Courthouse occupies a prominent position just off downtown Keene's Central Square, at the northwest corner of Court and Winter streets. It is a two-story masonry structure, built out of red brick and set on a rusticated granite foundation. The main facade is five bays wide on the ground floor and three on the second, with round-arch windows set in each bay except where the main entrance is located. The entrance is at the center of the facade, fronted by a hip-roof portico supported by paired square columns on either side of a round-arch entry. The upper floor corners are pilastered, and the central bay projects slightly, housing a large window set in a paneled recess. The main roof features a bracketed cornice, and is topped by an octagonal belfry with a weather vane.

Construction on the courthouse began in 1858, and it was first used in 1859. It was built on the site of an early records storage building, whose stone foundation may have been partly reused in construction of this building. The building was designed by Gridley James Fox Bryant, an architect from Boston, Massachusetts, who was well known for his many civic designs. The exterior of the building is virtually unaltered, and the interior is also little altered, mainly to provide modern amenities such as plumbing and electricity.

== See also ==
- National Register of Historic Places listings in Cheshire County, New Hampshire
