= United Church of Christ in Keene =

Historic church in New Hampshire, United States

- U.S. National Register of Historic Places
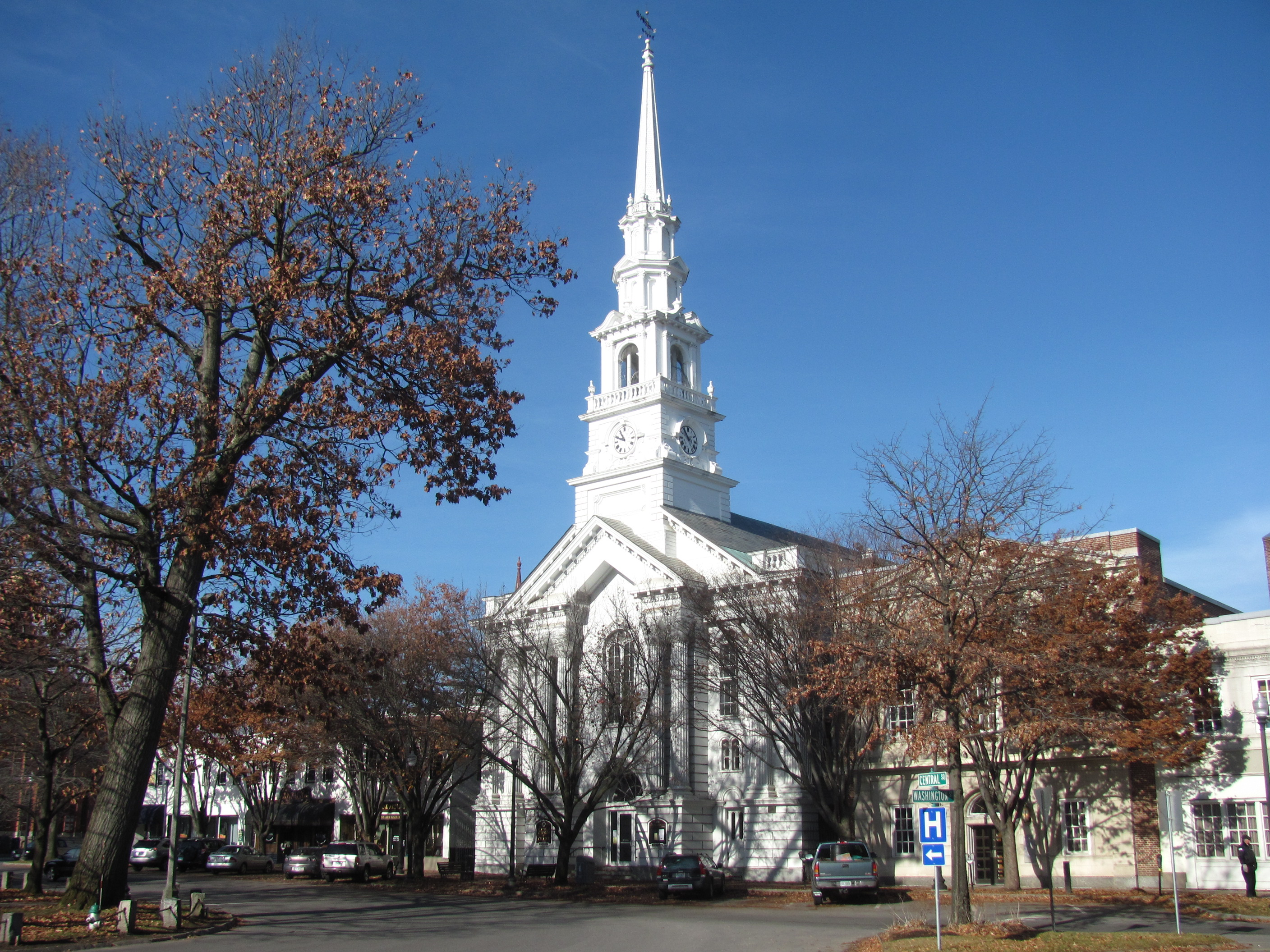
- United Church of Christ in Keene

- Location within New Hampshire Location within the United States
- Location: 23 Central Sq., Keene, New Hampshire
- Coordinates: 42°56′4″N 72°16′43″W
- Area: less than one acre
- Built: 1786
- Architect: Multiple
- NRHP reference No.: 82001671
- Added to NRHP: March 09, 1982

The United Church of Christ in Keene (also known as The First Church or Church at the Head of the Square) is a historic Congregational church at 23 Central Square in Keene, New Hampshire, United States. First built in 1786, and then moved and restyled in the 19th century, it is a prominent visual and architectural landmark in downtown Keene. The church and its adjacent parish house were listed on the National Register of Historic Places in 1982.

== Description and history ==
The United Church of Christ in Keene is sited prominently in downtown Keene, on the northern side of its Central Square. It has an elaborately decorated front facade, with the main entrance at the center in a rounded arch set in a projecting pavilion. The pavilion is fronted by fluted Corinthian columns, with paired pilasters on the facade on either side of the pavilion. The columns and pilasters rise to an entablature and modillioned cornice. A tower 130 feet (40 m) in height rises through five stages to a spire and cross.

The oldest portion of this church is its timber frame, a 50-by-70-foot (15 by 21 m) structure that was built in 1786 as the town's fourth meeting house. In 1828 the meeting house was rotated and moved, nearly to its present location, and the Greek Revival temple front with Doric columns was added, as was the tower and steeple. These alterations were supposedly inspired by the recent (1817–18) construction of the Third Fitzwilliam Meetinghouse. In 1859-60 the church was again moved, this time a short distance to make room for an enlarged sanctuary, as designed by the Worcester firm of Boyden & Ball. The building exterior has been little altered since; the steeple was recreated from photographs after the original was toppled by the New England Hurricane of 1938. In 1924 a two-story brick parish house was built next to the church.

== See also ==
- National Register of Historic Places listings in Cheshire County, New Hampshire
