= Terry Pindell =

Terry Pindell (born) is an American travel writer known primarily for three North American 'rail odysseys', through the US, Canada and Mexico, each of which became the subject of a travel book. He has also written a book on migration within the United States. The Toledo Blade said of his first book, Making Tracks: "Not since John Steinbeck's Travels with Charley has anyone put together a better story about America on the road."

A New Hampshire resident, Pindell is a former English teacher and mayoral candidate in Keene, NH. He is the grandson of a railroad engineer.

== Works ==
- Pindell, Terry (1990). Making Tracks: An American Rail Odyssey. New York: Grove Weidenfeld. ISBN 080211279X.
- Pindell, Terry (1992). Last Train to Toronto: A Canadian Rail Odyssey. New York: Henry Holt. ISBN 0805015744.
- Pindell, Terry (1995). A Good Place to Live: America's Last Migration. New York: Henry Holt. ISBN 9780805023527.
- Pindell, Terry; Mallis, Lourdes Ramirez (1997). Yesterday's Train: A Rail Odyssey Through Mexican History. New York: Henry Holt. ISBN 0805037918.
