= Miss Catherine Fiske's Young Ladies Seminary =

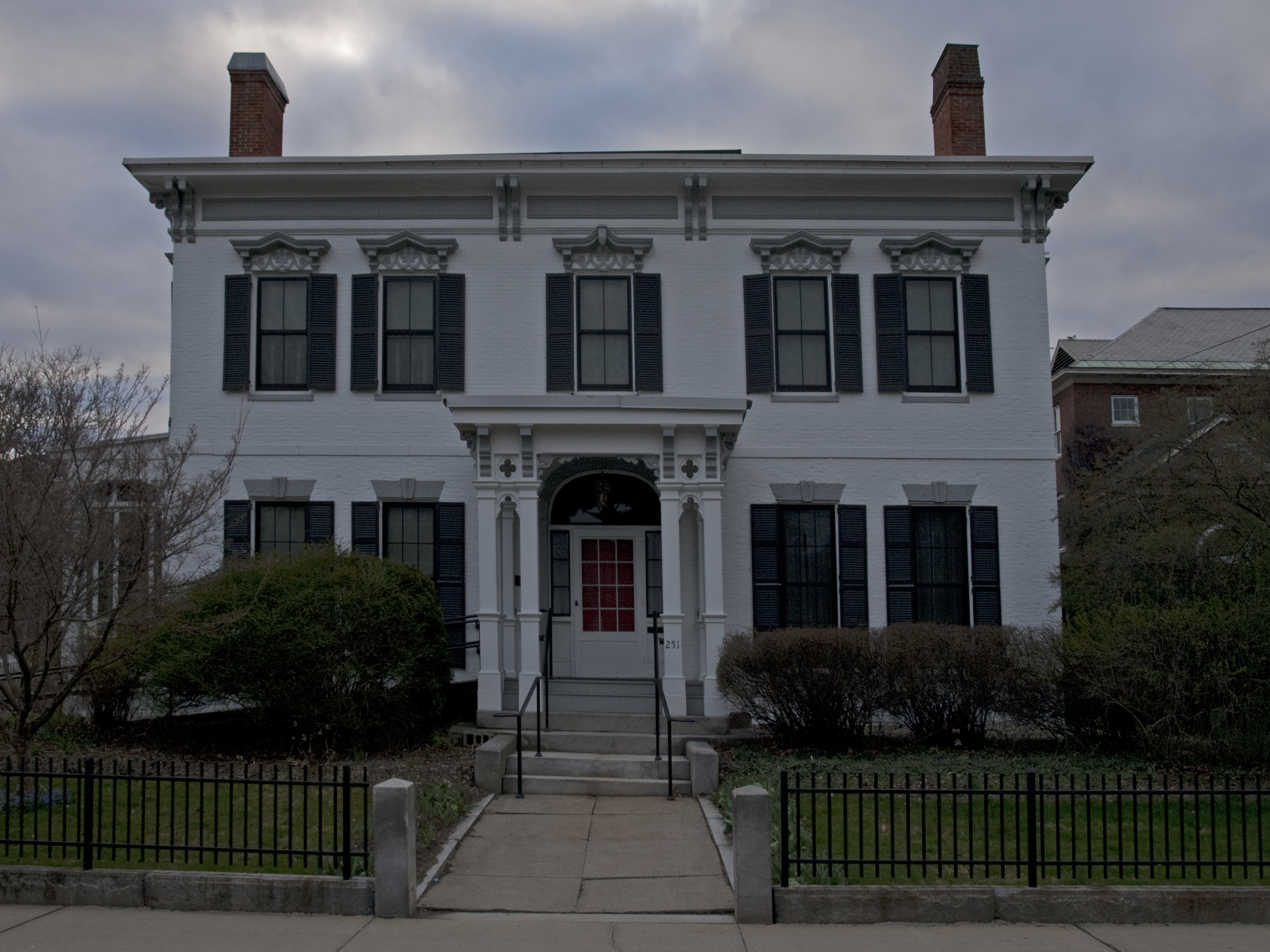
- Formerly Miss Fiske's seminary; presently, President's House at Keene State College
- Keene, New Hampshire; United States

Information
- Other name: Keene Female Seminary
- Established: 1814
- Founder: Catherine Fiske
- Closed: 1840s
- Principal: Catherine Fiske
- Principal: Eliza P. (Withington) Hastings
- Gender: girls

Miss Catherine Fiske's Young Ladies Seminary was a boarding and day school for young ladies, located in Keene, New Hampshire. Established in 1814, it achieved a national reputation. After the 1837 death of Catherine Fiske, the school's founder, the seminary continued to operate until the early 1840s. The property went through various changes but currently serves as the President's House at Keene State College.

== History ==
Fiske's school was a boarding establishment where she had the oversight of the culinary concerns and arrangements. She taught her pupils the same useful employments of the household in which she herself took not only a deep but a scientific interest. It was the first of its kind in New Hampshire and the second school of its kind in the country, Bradford Academy (Massachusetts) being the first. Miss Fiske's Seminary antedated Robinson's Female Seminary at Exeter, New Hampshire, which was founded in 1859, by 55 years, and Mary Lyon's Mount Holyoke Female Seminary at South Hadley, Massachusetts, by 36 years.

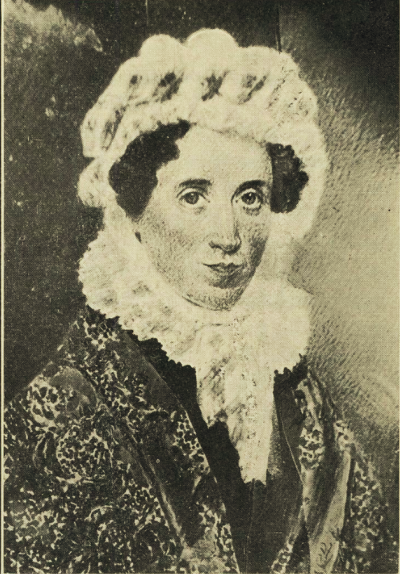
Catherine Fiske, school founder

Fiske taught the chemistry of making bread, demonstrated the astronomical and mathematical calculations of Isaac Newton and Pierre-Simon Laplace, and pointed out from the wildflowers of the valley of the Ashuelot River the principles to which Carl Linnaeus devoted himself. She enforced with appropriate remarks the syllogisms of Levi Hedge and the mental and moral sentiments of Isaac Watts on The Improvement of the Mind, and gave remarks appropriate to the youngest girl to initiate her into the mysteries of language.

In 1814, Fiske and Mrs. Newcomb provided instruction in reading, writing, English grammar, composition, arithmetic, history, geography, with the use of maps and globes, drawing and painting in the various branches, and plain and ornamental needle work. Strict attention was also paid to the improvement of the young ladies' morals and manners.

In 1817, when the seminary was referred to as the "School for Young Ladies and Misses", Fiske and Miss Sprague advertised that they would "pay all possible attention to the improvement of the manners, morals and minds of their pupils."

In 1823, 84 pupils were enrolled. Fiske served as principal, while the teachers included Mary B. Ware and Eliza P. Withington. In 1836, Fiske was the principal; Abigail Barnes and Charlotte Foxcroft were associate teachers; Eliza P. Withington was teacher in music.

In 1837, the instruction at the seminary was divided into four courses. First: spelling, reading, arithmetic, plain sewing, first books of geography and history. Second: reading English grammar, geography with use of maps and globes, arithmetic, writing, bookkeeping and composition, and what the law required to qualify a young women to instruct a district school. Third: the same, with political class, book rhetoric, natural philosophy and astronomy, geology, chemistry, botany, philosophy of natural history, algebra and geometry. Fourth: logic, moral and intellectual philosophy, natural theology and evidences of Christianity. The Latin and modern languages.

== Later years ==
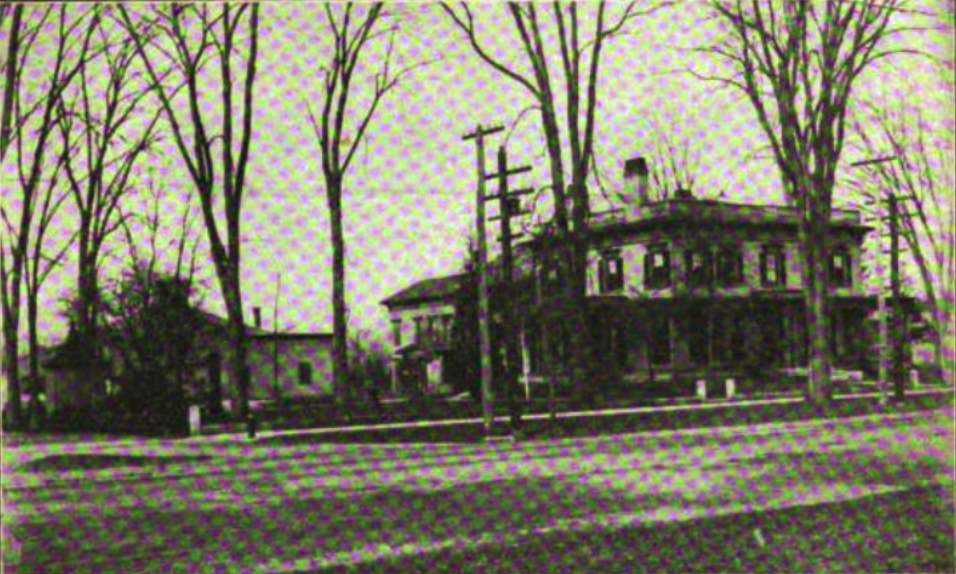
"Thayer House" (1907); formerly Miss Fiske's seminary

After the Keene Academy was established in 1836, the day pupils of Keene who had attended the Fiske seminary gradually left for the academy. Also, other academies soon after were established in the county, which reduced the student population. Fiske died the following year. The prospectus of 1838 stated that the school would continue under the case of those teachers who were associated with Fiske. Eliza P. (Withington) Hastings, became the principal, while Abigail (Barnes) Leverett, S. C. G. Swasey, and L. H. P. Withington were associate teachers. The school closed in the early 1840s, after 30 years of prosperity.

== Notable alumni ==
- Martha Reed Mitchell (1818–1902), philanthropist and socialite
- Jane Means Pierce (1806–1863), wife of Franklin Pierce and the first lady of the United States from 1853 to 1857
