= Whitney Brothers company history =

The original Whitney Bros. Co. factory was located in a water-powered mill building located on the Minnewawa River in the town of Marlborough, New Hampshire, during the American Industrial Revolution. Water power was important to Whitney Bros. Co. in its early days.

== The industrial revolution and water power in Marlborough ==
Although the Minnewawa River (now known as "Minnewawa Brook"; a tributary of the Ashuelot River) dropped sharply into the valley of Marlborough, the stream could not be depended upon as a reliable source of water power in the dry summer months. To mitigate this problem, enterprising businessmen representing several Monadnock Region manufacturers formed the Breed Pond Company in 1851 to obtain water flow and dam building rights to five principal bodies of water: Childs Reservoir, Silver Lake, Chesham Reservoir, Howe Reservoir and Marlborough Glen Reservoir. Shareholder companies in the Breed Pond Company shared the costs and labor of maintaining the dams that provided a reliably stable flow of water in the Minnewawa River.

By 1925, the only remaining shareholder companies in the Breed Pond Company were Valley Woolen Mills, Monadnock Blanket Mills and Whitney Bros. Co. Every morning during this period, Whitney Bros. Co. employee David P. Woods went to the Glen Reservoir dam on his way to work and opened the gate to allow water to flow into the factory ponds in Marlborough; at the end of the day, he closed the gate on his way home.

In 1927, Public Service Company of New Hampshire (now Eversource) obtained shares in the Breed Pond Co. after it funded construction of a much higher dam located on Howe Reservoir to provide increased water supply for its newly constructed hydroelectric power station on Roxbury Street in Marlborough. A few years later, Monadnock Blanket Mills and Valley Woolen Mills ended their participation in the Breed Pond Co., rendering it economically impractical for Whitney Bros. Co. to shoulder half the expenses of maintaining the reservoirs that produced only an 11-foot (3.4 m) bed of water at its factory. Whitney Bros. Co. sold its shares in the Breed Pond Co. to PSNH and converted its manufacturing operations into a completely motorized mechanical process.

== The original water-powered mill ==
The original building was a two-story wooden structure built in 1840 by Joseph Collins that featured a first floor located partially below street level to generate maximum water power capability. For many of its earliest years, the building was operated by Stillman Buss as a successful flour grist mill. From 1892 to 1900, the D J Hart Box Company produced lock-corner boxes in the mill before relocating, followed by the Marlboro Box Co., manufacturer of octagon-shaped wooden pails that employed unique dove-tailing joinery. In 1903, Charles A. Whitney in partnership with C. F. Pierce established a wooden toy manufacturing business in the mill. In autumn of 1903, Charles bought his partner's share in the business and then persuaded his brothers Fred O. and Mark A. Whitney to join him in the venture, producing the namesake company. On January 15, 1908, Whitney Bros. Co. officially incorporated.

On March 29, 1909, Fred was killed in an industrial accident when a drive belt wound errantly onto a revolving shaft and ripped it violently out of the factory ceiling onto his chest, crushing him. Following Fred's death, Charles and Mark continued to operate the business. In 1925, Mark's son Roland A. Whitney graduated from Dartmouth College and joined his father and uncle at the company.

== The early years ==
As its toy business increased in the early 1900s, the company constructed two additional floors on the main part of the factory building to provide sufficient workspace and storage. In 1914, a separate warehouse was constructed on Roxbury Street. From 1904 until World War II, the company primarily used native pine lumber to construct its line of toy products, including hay carts, small "express" wagons, wheelbarrows, laundry tub stands, clothes drying racks, wooden snow shovels and even adult sewing stands. All the toys were packed for shipment to customers in wooden crates with newspaper padding.

In June 1933 amid the Great Depression, Congress passed the National Industrial Recovery Act as part of President Roosevelt's New Deal legislative action to regulate industry and stimulate economic recovery. When the U.S. entered World War II on December 7, 1941, the National Industrial Recovery Act was modified to declare pine lumber a strategic war material and thus prohibited its use in certain commercial products, including toys. This impacted the company profoundly, forcing a switch to hardwood as the primary construction material. The company never again used pine wood in its manufacturing processes.

Over time, the company's products evolved from old hay carts, laundry sets, and shovels into small toy wagons that grew in popularity and sophistication. Spoke and tin-rimmed wheels were replaced by stronger hardwood disc wheels, and finishes changed from wood dyes to colorful red enamels and glossy varnish. Over time, wheeled toys faded away and the product line was dominated by children's doll furniture that was originally finished in ivory and light green enamel, then later evolved to natural wood, maple and walnut finishes.

== The challenging years ==
On November 7, 1933, a fire completely destroyed the four-story factory building, but all the business records were saved, including accounts receivables at their highest levels of the year.

The day after the fire, the only remaining structures were the warehouse on Roxbury Street, the small warehouse next to the factory building, the brick heating plant, and the fully stocked lumber yard. How these structures survived was a marvel: Until the brick heating plant was built across the river, the wooden factory building had been heated solely by burning waste wood, shavings and sawdust in box stoves. In the aftermath of the fire, it appeared to be a total loss. Water that was poured on the fire had frozen all the smoke-blackened machines, and not a single wheel would turn. But closer inspection revealed the machines were indeed fully intact and simply frozen solid in ice, including the water wheel that powered the entire manufacturing process.

The remains of the burned-out factory building were removed right down to the cement ground floor. Next, workers piped in steam from the heating plant to melt the ice in the water wheel, and power created by the water wheel was transferred to a shaft attached to the cement floor that operated a straight-line rip saw, planer and a few other machines. With manufacturing capability partially restored, workers re-sawed and planed spruce lumber from the company's lumberyard to build a new factory building around the machinery in place. At night, the machines were protected by removable wooden covers that resembled small chicken coops.

Although insurance covered the total loss of the factory building, funds were not sufficient to construct a new two-story factory, as the economy was still in the grips of the Great Depression. In a remarkable gesture of neighbor-helping-neighbor, prominent Keene general contractor Glenroy W. Scott offered to build the new factory for only the cost of his labor and materials simply to keep his idle construction crew busy during the winter of 1933 until their next project, the construction of Vilas High School in spring 1934. The result was a new two-story factory building. Again because of the Depression, the company was able to procure necessary replacement machines at favorable prices.

== Management transition and company expansion ==
Mark A. Whitney retired from the company and moved to Springfield, Vermont, then returned to Keene until his death in 1968 at the age of 94. Roland A. Whitney continued to operate the business after his brother Mark retired and assumed the role of president, treasurer and sole owner. As sales increased and the business grew, he took on a partner, Griffin M. Stabler, a former executive of the Carpenter Steel Company of Elizabeth, New Jersey, who invested in Whitney Brothers and became its vice president in 1962.

A few years after World War II ended, storied firearms manufacturer Firearms Harrington & Richardson of Worcester, Massachusetts, lost its government contract and sold its box manufacturing facility located in Marlborough to the Whitney Bros. Co. The production facility had been previously occupied by the D.J. Box Co., followed by the Marlboro Box Co., then it was acquired by Harrington & Richardson at the end of World War II. The much larger facility enabled the Whitney Bros. Co. to increase its production capacity and expand its toys and doll furniture product lines to include combination easel / blackboards and other educational play-value products for children. Sales channels grew through major mail-order catalogs, national department stores, trading stamp retailers, and various other national and regional chain store merchants.

In 1964, Whitney Bros. Co. began subcontract manufacturing work for Creative Playthings of Princeton, New Jersey, and became the primary supplier of wood toys to that company for several years afterward. In 1969, Bernard M. Barenholtz, founding partner of Creative Playthings, sold his interest in that company to CBS (Columbia Broadcasting Company) and subsequently purchased Roland's partnership interest in Whitney Bros. Later that same year, Roland retired from the company.

Production of doll furniture continued until 1980, when the company moved to its current Railroad Street location in Keene in a three-story Civil War-era brick complex comprising 120,000 square feet (11,000 m^{2}) of manufacturing and warehouse space.

In 2009, the company changed its operating name to Whitney Brothers.

Hillary Clinton visited the company factory in 2015 as part of her candidacy tour.

In 2019 the company recorded highest profits in its history, was employing 50 people and had plans to expand.

In 2025, the company was acquired by Empowered Ventures.

== Awards ==
- 2020 Teachers Choice Award
- 2025 - Spaces4Learning Product Award
