= Michael Dubruiel =

Michael Dubruiel (November 16, 1958 – February 3, 2009) was a Roman Catholic author and speaker. Born in Keene, New Hampshire, Dubruiel served for four years in the U.S. Army before studying for a BA in philosophy from the now-closed St. Meinrad College and an MA in Christian Spirituality from Creighton University. Like his wife, Amy Welborn, Dubruiel became a widely read Catholic blogger while also writing several books.

Works written by Dubruiel include:

- How To Get The Most Out Of The Eucharist
- The How-To Book of the Mass
- The Church's Most Powerful Novenas
- The Power of the Cross
- Praying in the Presence of Our Lord with Fulton J. Sheen
- Praying the Rosary
- A Pocket Guide to the Mass
- A Pocket Guide to Confession
- Pope John Paul's Biblical Way of the Cross
