= President's House (Keene State College) =

Historic house in New Hampshire, United States

- Catherine Fiske Seminary For Young Ladies
- U.S. National Register of Historic Places
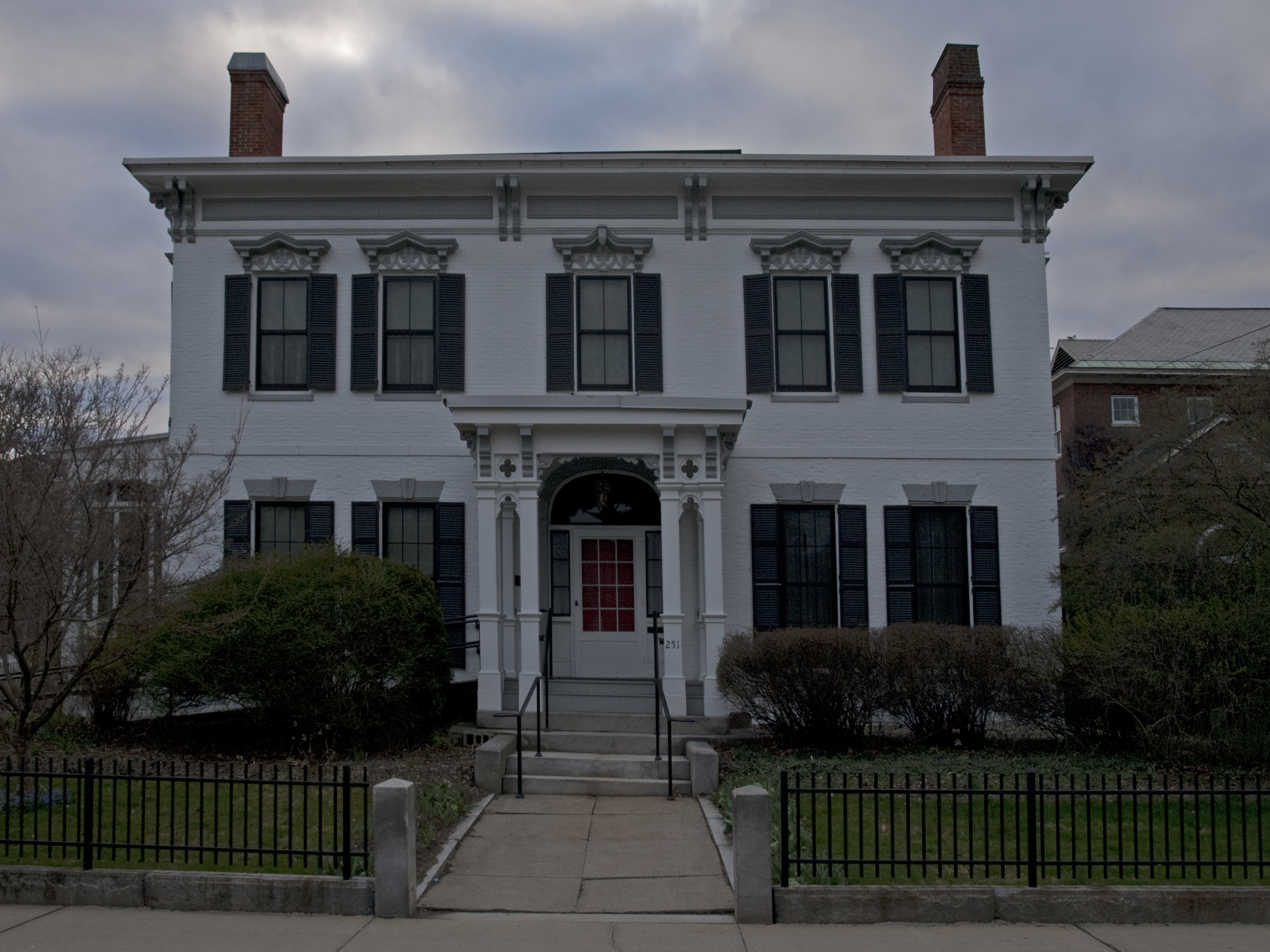

- Location within New Hampshire Location within the United States
- Location: 251 Main St., Keene, New Hampshire
- Coordinates: 42°55′37″N 72°16′40″W
- Area: 0.8 acres (0.32 ha)
- Built: 1805
- Architectural style: Federal
- NRHP reference No.: 76000196
- Added to NRHP: May 3, 1976

The President's House of Keene State College, formerly the Catherine Fiske Seminary For Young Ladies, is a historic house at 251 Main Street in Keene, New Hampshire. Built in 1805 and restyled in the late 19th century, it is one of Keene's oldest brick residences, and now serves as the official residence of its president. The house was listed on the National Register of Historic Places in 1976.

== Description and history ==
The Keene State President's House is located on the east side of the college campus, on the west side of Main Street at its junction with Appian Way. It is a two-story brick structure, with a low-pitch hip roof. Its exterior is Italianate in style, with a symmetrical five-bay facade adorned with elaborate window lintels and a cornice with paired brackets. An Italianate porch shelters the main entrance, supported by clustered square columns.

The house was built in 1805 by John Bond, the local postmaster and a shopkeeper, and was one of the first brick houses in the town. Originally Federal in its styling, it was extensively redesigned later in the 19th century. The house served as a girls' school from 1824 to 1844 under the oversight of Catherine Fiske. The house was acquired by the state for use in a normal school, now Keene State College. Its associated carriage barn, used for vocational automotive training, burned in 1925, and its basement hole was converted into a sunken garden.

== See also ==
- National Register of Historic Places listings in Cheshire County, New Hampshire
