= Isaac Wyman =

Continental Army colonel (1724–1792)

- Born: January 18, 1724
- Died: March 31, 1792 (aged 68)
- Military career
- Allegiance: Kingdom of Great Britain; United States
- Branch: British Army; United States Army
- Units: New Hampshire Provincial Regiment; 1st New Hampshire Regiment
- Commands: New Hampshire militia
- Conflicts: French and Indian War: Siege of Fort William Henry; Battle of Carillon; American Revolutionary War: Siege of Boston; Battle of Bunker Hill; Invasion of Quebec

Isaac Wyman (1724–1792) was born January 18, 1724, in Woburn, Massachusetts, to Joshua Wyman and his wife Mary Pollard. In 1747 he married Sarah Wells of Franklin, Massachusetts. They had nine children altogether.

As a young man, Wyman moved to Keene, New Hampshire, and served in the New Hampshire Provincial Regiment during the French and Indian War at the Battle of Fort William Henry and the Battle of Carillon in 1757 and 1758 respectively. In 1762 he opened a tavern on Main Street in Keene, this building is now a museum. Wyman was chosen to represent Keene at the New Hampshire General Assembly in January and February 1775.

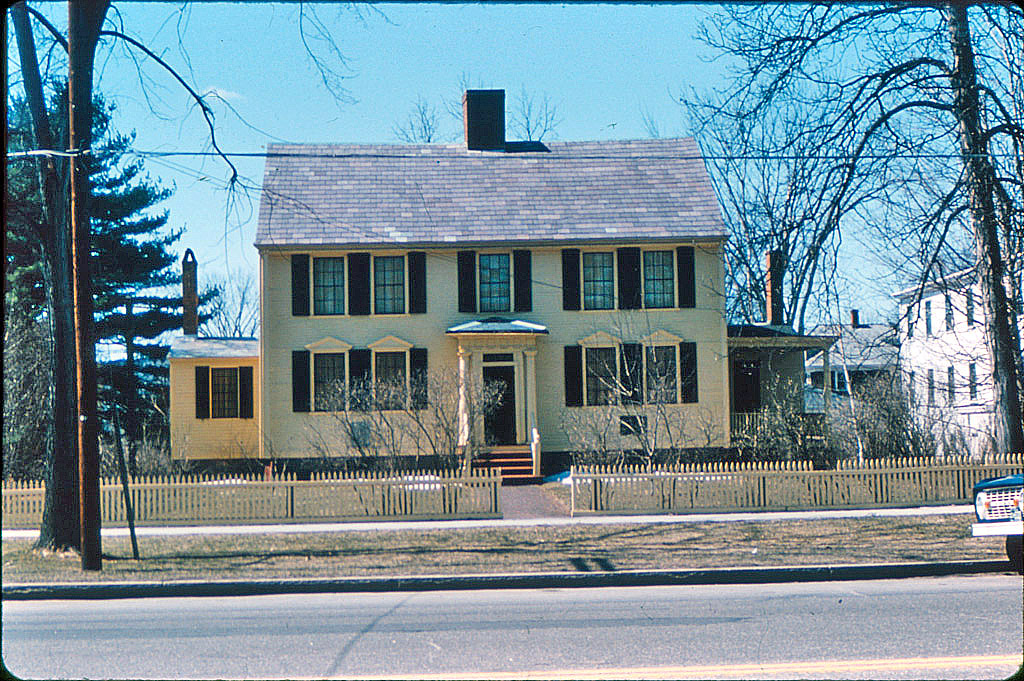
The Wyman Tavern, at 339 Main Street, Keene, New Hampshire.

At the outbreak of the American Revolutionary War in April 1775 Wyman, as a captain of the local militia, led a company from Keene to the Siege of Boston and joined John Stark's 1st New Hampshire Regiment in the Battle of Bunker Hill. In 1776 he was appointed as colonel of a New Hampshire militia regiment sent to reinforce the Continental Army in its retreat from Canada. His regiment mustered at Keene July 16, 1776, and marched to Fort at Number 4 and then on to Fort Ticonderoga where it stayed until December of that year, when the regiment returned to New Hampshire for winter quarters. This was Col. Wyman's last military campaign; after this time his advancing years kept him from any more military service. He would go on to become a justice of the peace in his home town of Keene, New Hampshire, until his death on March 31, 1792.
