= Catherine Fiske =

American school founder, teacher (1784–1837)

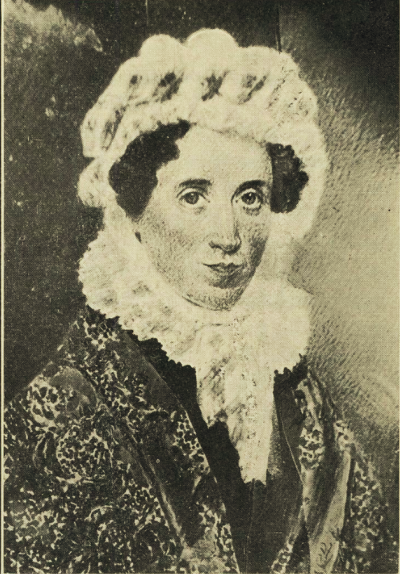
- Born: July 30, 1784; Worcester, Massachusetts
- Died: May 20, 1837 (aged 52)
- Other names: Catharine Fiske
- Occupations: teacher; principal; school founder; benefactor
- Known for: Miss Catherine Fiske's Young Ladies Seminary

Catherine Fiske (July 30, 1784 – May 20, 1837) was an American teacher and principal who founded a girls' boarding school, Miss Catherine Fiske's Young Ladies Seminary. Located in Keene, New Hampshire, it was in operation from 1814 until the 1840s. Presently, the seminary's building serves as President's House, Keene State College. Fiske was also a benefactor for the New Hampshire State Hospital.

== Early life and education ==
Catherine (or Catharine) Fiske was born in Worcester, Massachusetts, July 30, 1784. Her father died after she was born so her education depended on her mother. Her mother married a second husband and they lived for a time in rural Vermont.

She attended the public schools, more or less, at Worcester. At the age of twelve, she moved to Vermont. She was uncommonly attached to books, and read a great many hours and days when other children were at play. When she did not understand the author, someone had to explain it to her satisfaction, or she could not very willingly lay her book aside; and, when once made to understand, it was never forgotten.

== Career ==
She began her career as a teacher at the age of 15. She was an instructor in the public or district schools, and taught in various places, in New Hampshire and Vermont, especially at Athol, Massachusetts, Phillipsburg, and Keene. At the latter place, she became, at length a permanent teacher; but not till she had become very much distinguished for her skill and good management, in the common schools of more rural country places.

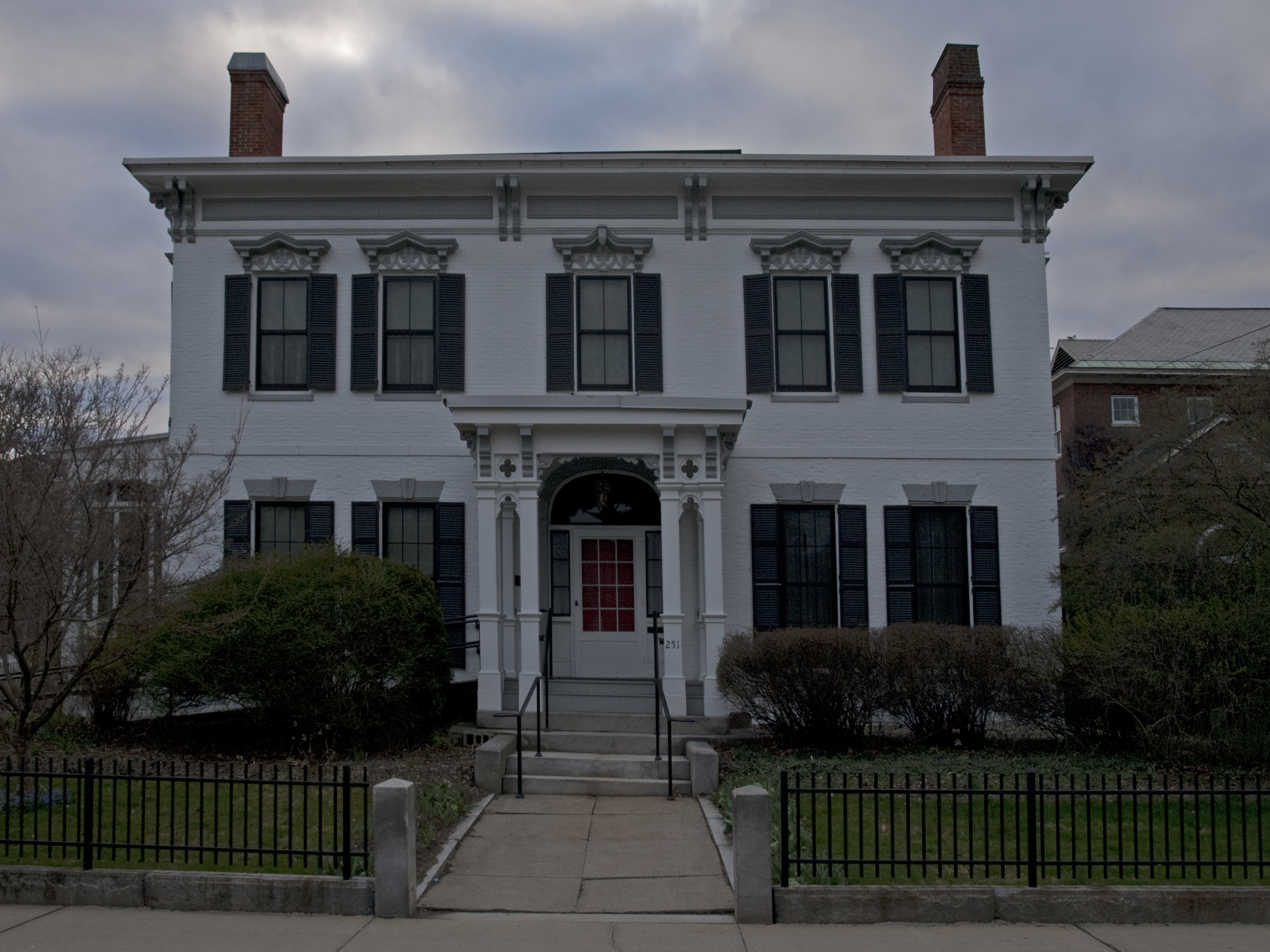
Miss Fiske's Seminary

Fiske had been engaged in teaching for 15 years, before coming to Keene in 1811. She began teaching in the town, but did not open Fiske's Young Ladies Seminary until May 1814. She purchased a building with a large farm, later known as the "Thayer" property. The school received both boarding and day scholars. At one time, a class of boys was also admitted as day scholars.

Fiske made provision for a large household, and superintended all its culinary and economical concerns, while she was giving directions how to manage her farm. Both school and farm were managed exclusively by herself, but with numerous helpers, loyal, well-chosen and well-trained. Her vigilance was never relaxed and no detail, whether educational or domestic, was overlooked in her daily routine. She performed her duties while frequently a sufferer from pain, her health being always delicate, and often feeble. Fiske operated the seminary till her death in 1837. During the 38 years in which she was employed as a teacher, it is estimated she had under her care more than 2,500 pupils.

== Death and legacy ==
Fiske died May 20, 1837.

After Fiske's death, Eliza P. Withington was promoted to the Principal position at the seminary. Fiske left the income of her property, about US$10,000, to Withington, as long as she was connected with the school, after which it went to the New Hampshire Insane Asylum, the state paying Withington a US$275 annuity during her lifetime.

In 1837, before the opening of the New Hampshire State Hospital, Fiske demonstrated her benevolent impulses by bequeathing to it a legacy of nearly US$6,000, charged with certain temporary annuities. By the terms of her will, this bequest was not to be paid to the asylum until the expiration of 50 years from the time of her decease. It became payable in 1887 and amounted at that time to over US$23,000.

In God's Acre, on Washington Street, a monument was erected to her memory, with the following epitaph: "Catherine Fiske, Founder and Principal of the Female Seminary in Kenne, N. H., and for thirty-eight years a teacher of youth, died May 20, 1837, aged 53."
