= Zedekiah Smith Barstow =

American minister

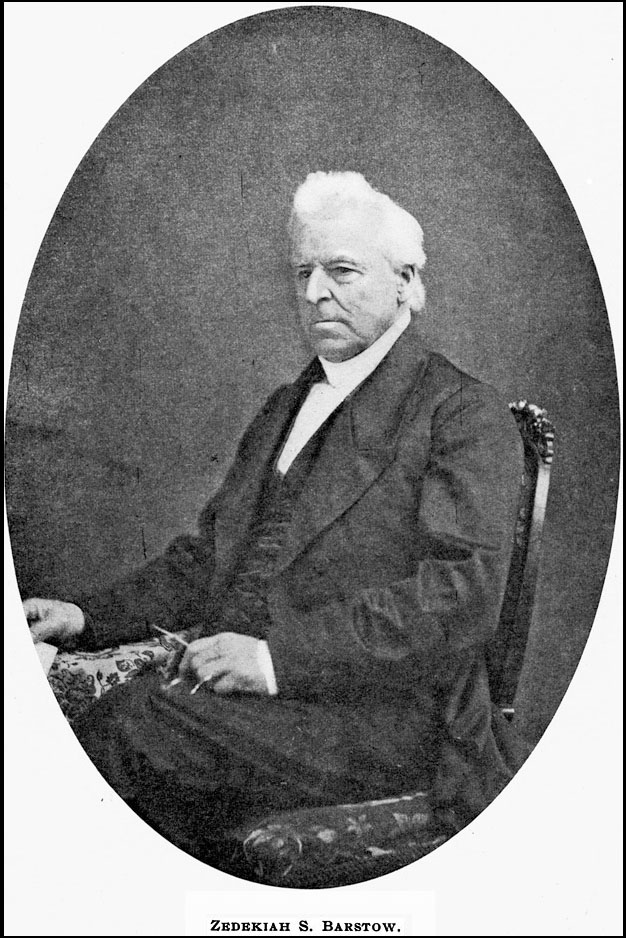
- Born: October 4, 1790; Canterbury, Connecticut, U.S.
- Died: March 1, 1873 (aged 82); Keene, New Hampshire, U.S.
- Occupation(s): Minister, educator, college trustee

Zedekiah Smith Barstow (October 4, 1790 – March 1, 1873) was an American Congregational minister and educator, based in Keene, New Hampshire. He served as a trustee for Dartmouth College.

== Early life and education ==
Barstow, the youngest child of Deacon John and Susannah (Smith) Barstow, was born in Canterbury, Connecticut, October 4, 1790. Having previously prepared himself in the mathematics and the higher English branches, while working on his father's farm, he commenced the study of the classics at the age of 19, with Rev. Erastus Learned, of Canterbury, and after six months of persevering study, was admitted to Yale College in 1811, where he graduated in 1813. He received the degree of Doctor in Divinity from Dartmouth College in 1849.

== Career ==
After graduation Barstow pursued his theological studies under the direction of President Dwight, and was licensed to preach in New Haven in 1814. For two years he was tutor and college chaplain in Hamilton College, where he received the degree of A.M. (ad eundem) 1816, and was invited to accept a professorship, but declined, preferring to devote his life to pastoral work. He was settled over the Congregational Church in Keene, New Hampshire, July 1, 1818. On July 1, 1868, he resigned his charge, after 50 years of pastoral service, during which long period he had failed to preach but eight Sabbaths.

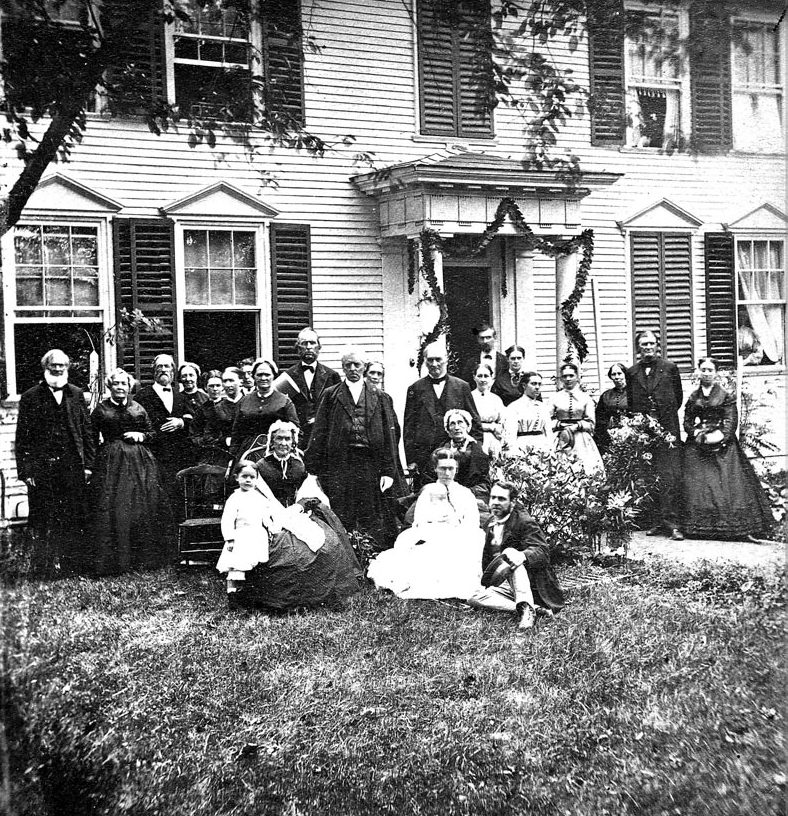
Photograph of the Golden Wedding Anniversary of Zedekiah Smith Barstow and Elizabeth Fay Blake Barstow of Keene, New Hampshire. The photo was taken on 8/19/1868 in front of the Wyman Tavern at 339 Main Street.

For 37 years he served as trustee of Dartmouth College (never missing attendance on a single meeting of the Board during his term of service); he was secretary for many years of the General Association of New Hampshire, a corporate member of the A. B. C. F. M., trustee of Kimball Union Academy, trustee and secretary of Keene Academy until his death, and prominent in all the educational and religious movements of the day. He was also member of the New Hampshire Legislature, and chaplain of that body in 1868 and 1869.

After his resignation he still continued to preach for destitute parishes in the vicinity. Barstow's influence as a pastor, a scholar, and a public man will long be felt not only in the town where he lived, but throughout the State.

== Personal life and legacy ==
In August 1818, Barstow married Elizabeth Fay Blake, eldest daughter of Elihu Blake, of Westborough, Massachusetts. They had five children. His wife died in 1869, and Barstow died in 1873, at the age of 82, in Keene. Two sons survived him, including Josiah Whitney Barstow, a prominent physician. The New Hampshire Historical Society has the Barstow Family Papers. Dartmouth has other Barstow papers. In 2023, to mark its 285th anniversary, the United Church of Christ in Keene restored the Barstows' gravesite in Washington Cemetery.
