= Keene, New Hampshire =

- City
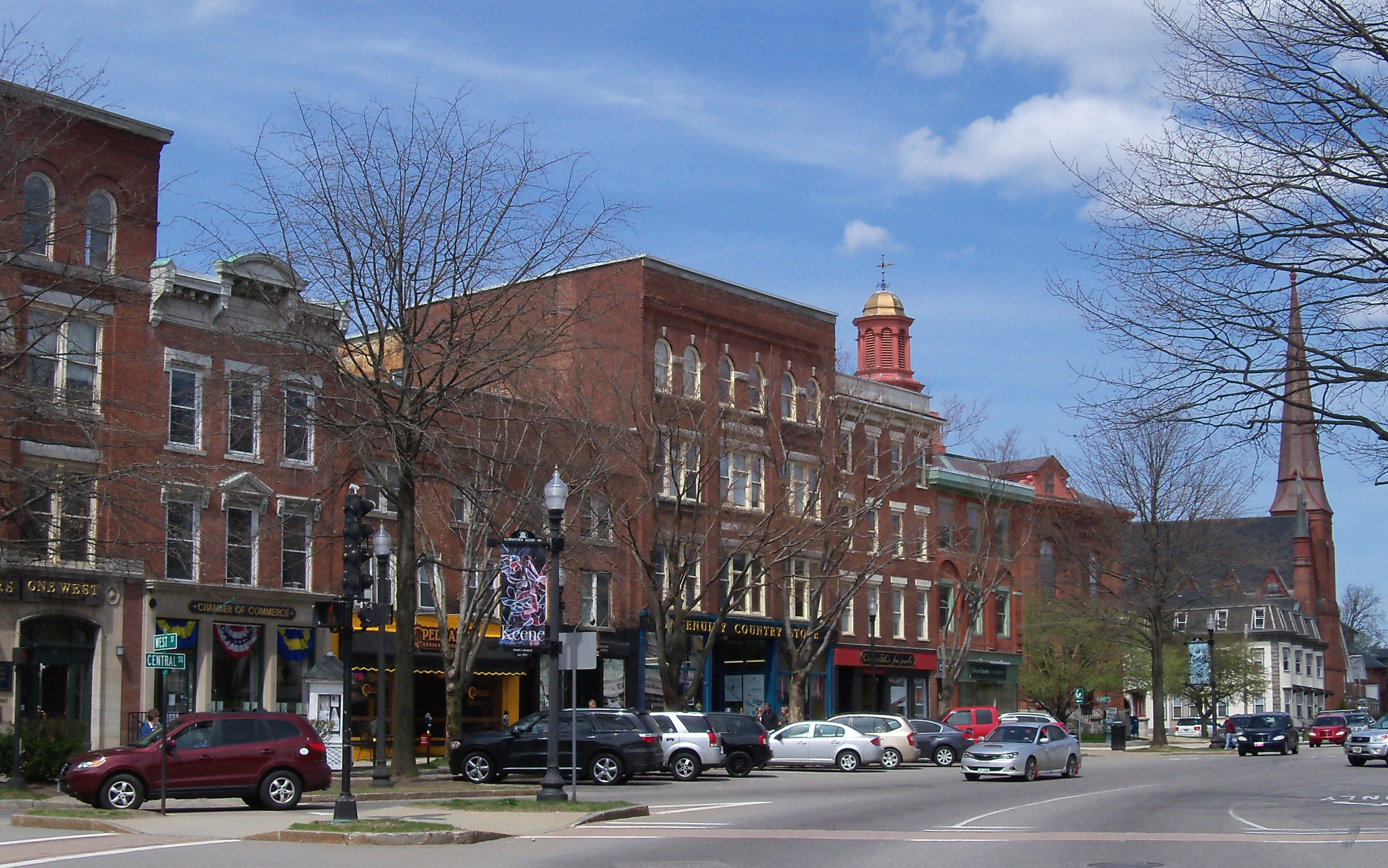
- Central Square in downtown Keene

- Flag Seal
- Nickname: Elm City
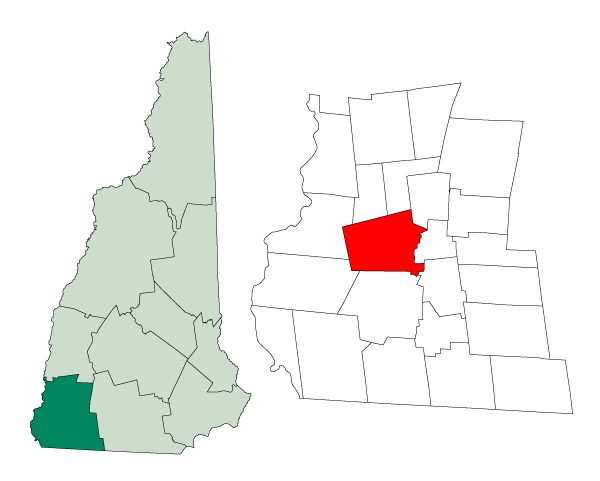
- Location in Cheshire County, New Hampshire
- Coordinates: 42°56′58″N 72°17′59″W
- Country: United States
- State: New Hampshire
- County: Cheshire
- Settled: 1736
- Incorporated: 1753 (town)
- Incorporated: 1874 (city)
- Named for: Benjamin Keene

Government
  - Mayor: Jay Kahn

Area
  - Total: 37.35 sq mi (96.74 km^{2})
  - Land: 37.09 sq mi (96.07 km^{2})
  - Water: 0.26 sq mi (0.67 km^{2})
- Elevation: 479 ft (146 m)

Population (2020)
  - Total: 23,047
  - Density: 621/sq mi (239.9/km^{2})
- Time zone: UTC−5 (EST)
  - Summer (DST): UTC−4 (EDT)
- ZIP Codes: 03431, 03435
- Area code: 603
- FIPS code: 39300
- GNIS feature ID: 873635
- Website: keenenh.gov

Keene is a city in Cheshire County, New Hampshire, United States. Its population was 23,047 at the 2020 census, down from 23,409 at the 2010 census, and an estimated 23,072 in 2025. It is the county seat and the only city in Cheshire County.

Keene is home to Keene State College and Antioch University New England. It hosted the state's annual pumpkin festival from 1991 to 2014, several times setting a world record for most jack-o'-lanterns on display.

== History ==
In 1735, colonial Governor Jonathan Belcher granted lots in the township of "Upper Ashuelot" to 63 settlers who paid £5 each (equivalent to US$1,282.19 in 2025). It was settled after 1736 on Equivalent Lands.

In 1747, during King George's War, the village was attacked and burned by Natives. Colonists fled to safety, but would return to rebuild in 1749. It was regranted to its inhabitants in 1753 by Governor Benning Wentworth, who renamed it "Keene" after Sir Benjamin Keene, a principal of the South Sea Trading Company, whose primary business was slave trading.

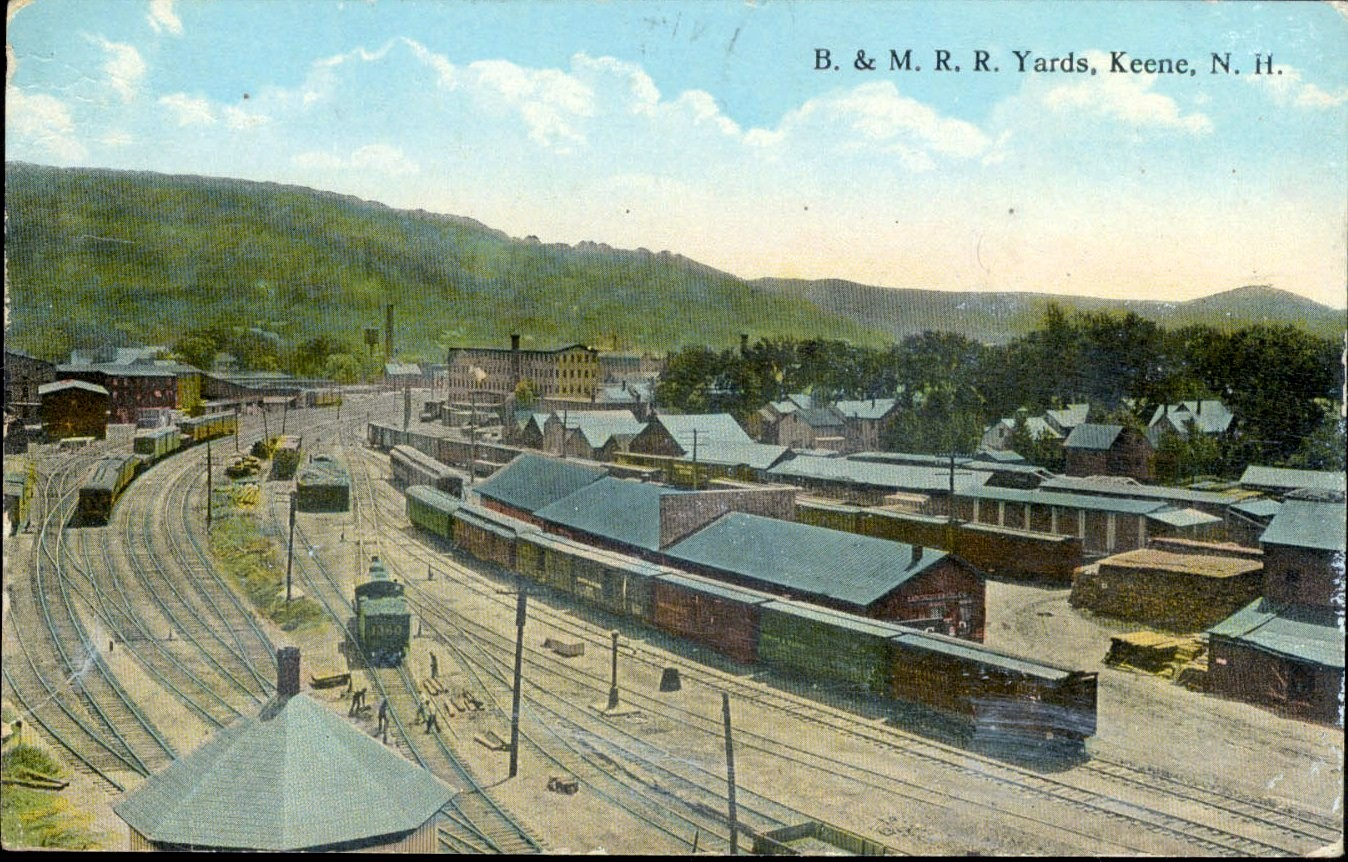
Boston and Maine Railroad yard in Keene, c. 1916

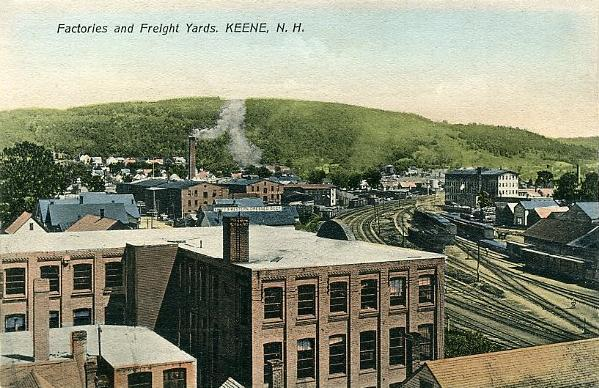
Freight yards in 1907

=== 19th century to 20th century ===
Railroad development in Keene began with unsuccessful proposals in 1829 and 1835, before the Cheshire Railroad was chartered in 1844. A depot was constructed near lower Marlboro Street in 1847, along with the laying of the track and the building of the Stone Arch Bridge at West Keene. The railroad formally opened to Keene on May 16, 1848, when a decorated train from Boston arrived before a crowd reported to number more than 5,000 people. Regular passenger and freight service between Keene and Bellows Falls, Vermont began in January 1849. The Ashuelot Railroad ran its first trains in December 1850, while the Manchester and Keene Railroad reached the city in 1878. The resulting connections to Massachusetts, Vermont and New York contributed to industrial growth, and by 1890 Keene had become a regional railroad center.

Keene's railroads were subsequently incorporated into larger regional railways. The Cheshire Railroad consolidated with the Fitchburg Railroad in 1890, while the Ashuelot Railroad consolidated with the Connecticut River Railroad that year and was taken over by the Boston and Maine Railroad in 1893.

The city's own electric street railway began regular service in 1900, and eventually operated lines connecting central Keene with West Keene, Marlborough and Swanzey Factory. The Keene Electric Railway was authorized to replace its rail lines with motor buses in 1926 and continued operating until 1929. Passenger rail service declined during the mid-20th century, with the last passenger train departing Keene for Bellows Falls on May 31, 1958, ending 110 years of passenger service in the city.

In 1920, Keene's population stood at 11,210 and increased as the city's industrial and commercial economy grew, with the town becoming a regional institutional center of southwestern New Hampshire. During the Great Depression, Keene's banks closed temporarily and federal assistance subsequently supported highway, water, sewer and park-improvement projects in the town. In 1936, there was serious flooding and the 1938 New England hurricane affected the city, damaged homes and factories and destroyed nearly 1,000 elm trees; the resulting flood-control program included Surry Dam, which was completed in 1942.

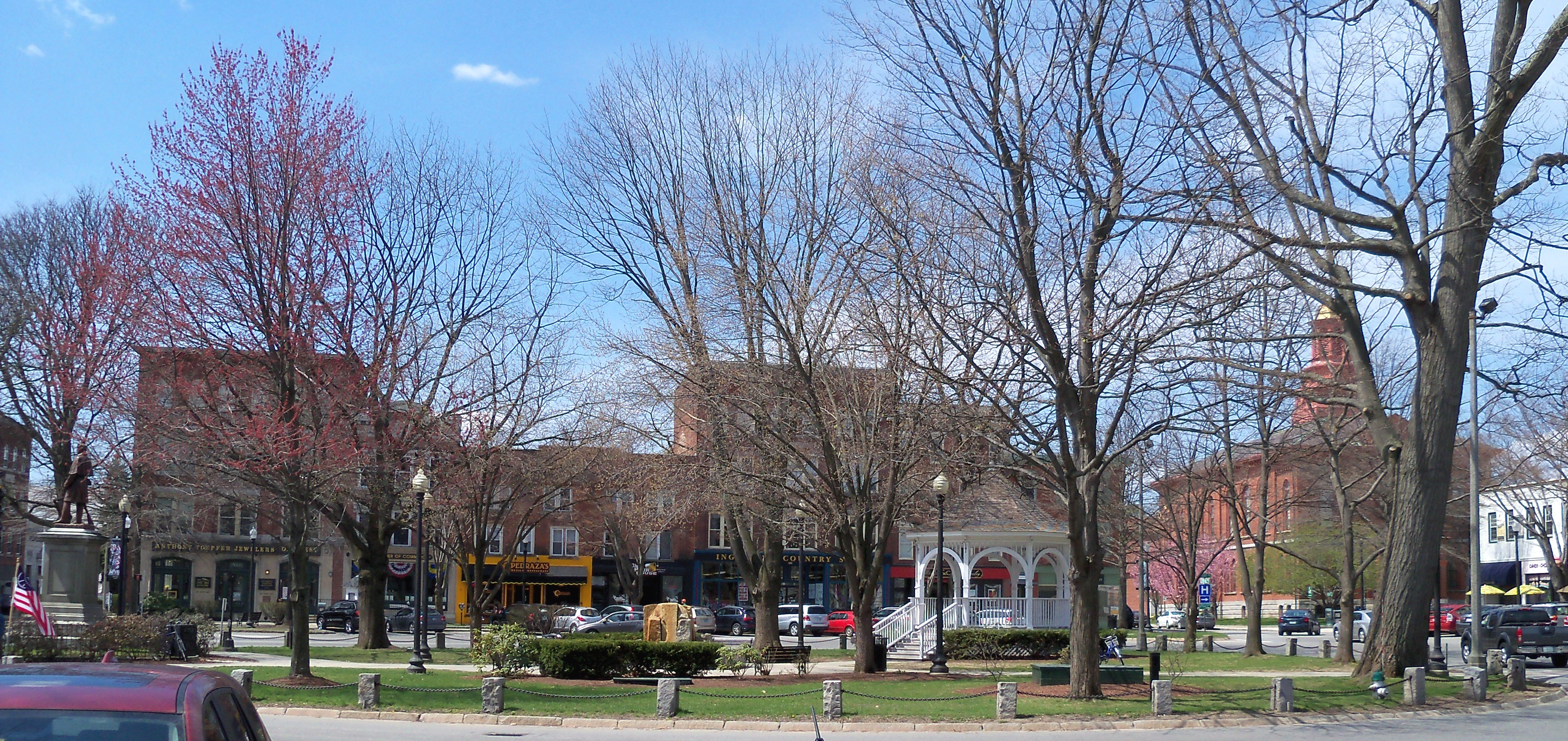
Downtown Keene

In the postwar period, Keene's educational and service functions expanded with Keene Teachers College, which became Keene State College in 1963. In 1987, the city spent approximately $2 million improving Main Street and Central Square to create a more pedestrian-oriented downtown.

=== 21st century to present ===
Beginning in 2000, Keene inventoried nearly 200 historic properties and then set up a municipal heritage and downtown historic-district body to support the restoration and reuse of prominent historic buildings.

In the 2020 United States census, the city's population was 23,047.

In 2011, Massachusetts man Thomas Ball immolated himself on the steps of a courthouse in Keene to protest what he considered the court system's abuse of divorced fathers' rights.

== Geography ==
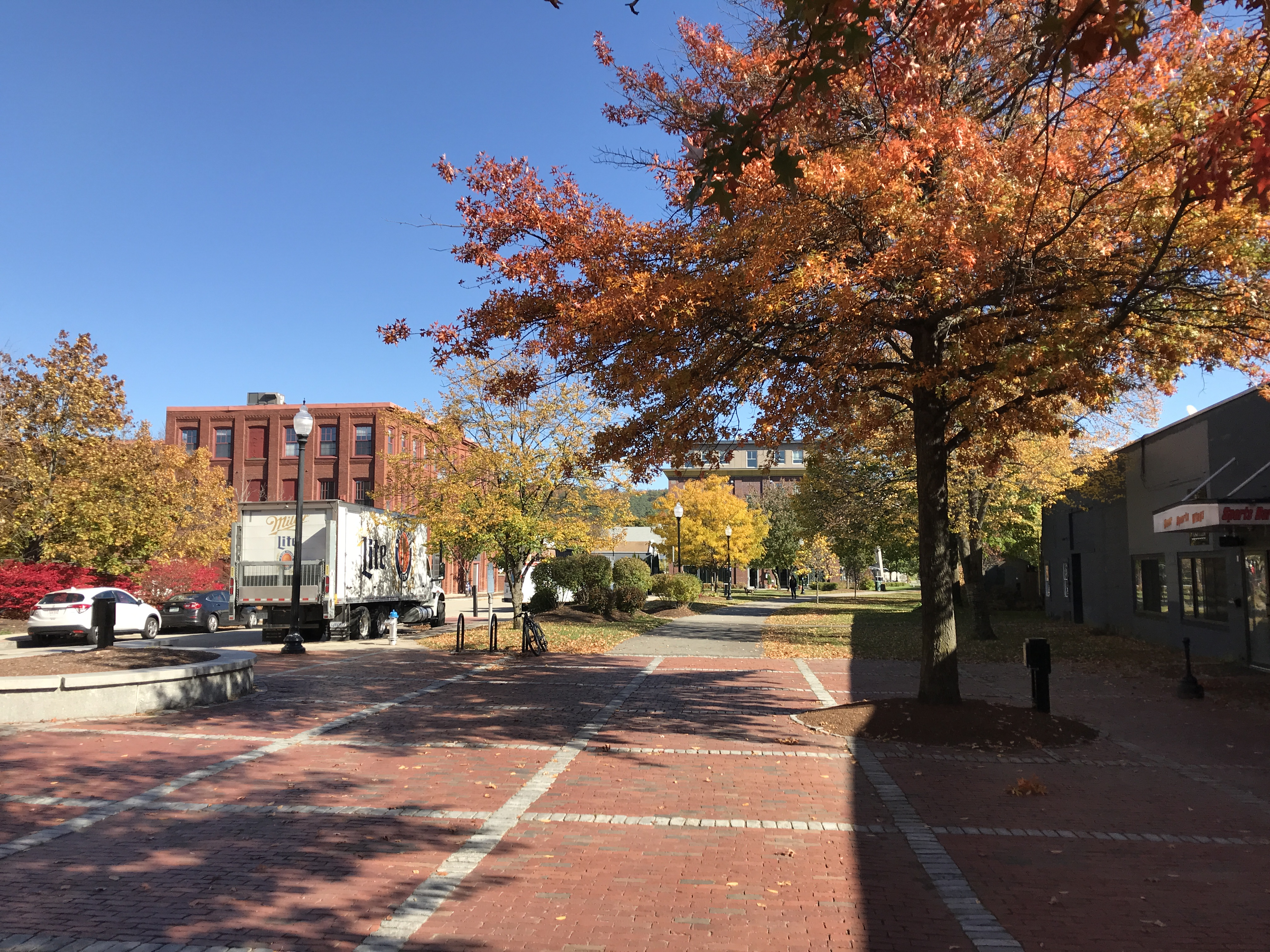
Industrial Heritage Trail downtown

According to the United States Census Bureau, the city has a total area of 37.3 square miles (96.7 km^{2}), of which 37.1 square miles (96.1 km^{2}) are land and 0.3 square miles (0.7 km^{2}) (0.69%) is covered by water. Keene is drained by the Ashuelot River. The highest point in Keene is the summit of Grays Hill in the city's northwestern corner, at 1,388 feet (423 m) above sea level. Keene is entirely within the Connecticut River watershed, with all of the city except for the northwestern corner draining to the Connecticut via the Ashuelot.

State highways converge on Keene from nine directions. New Hampshire Route 9 leads northeast to Concord, the state capital, and west to Brattleboro, Vermont. Route 10 leads north to Newport and southwest to Northfield, Massachusetts. Route 12 leads northwest to Walpole and Charlestown and southeast to Winchendon, Massachusetts. Route 101 leads east to Peterborough and Manchester, Route 32 leads south to Swanzey, then to Athol, Massachusetts, and Route 12A leads north to Surry and Alstead. A limited-access bypass used variously by Routes 9, 10, 12, and 101 passes around the north, west, and south sides of downtown.

Keene is served by Dillant–Hopkins Airport, located just south of the city in Swanzey.

=== Climate ===
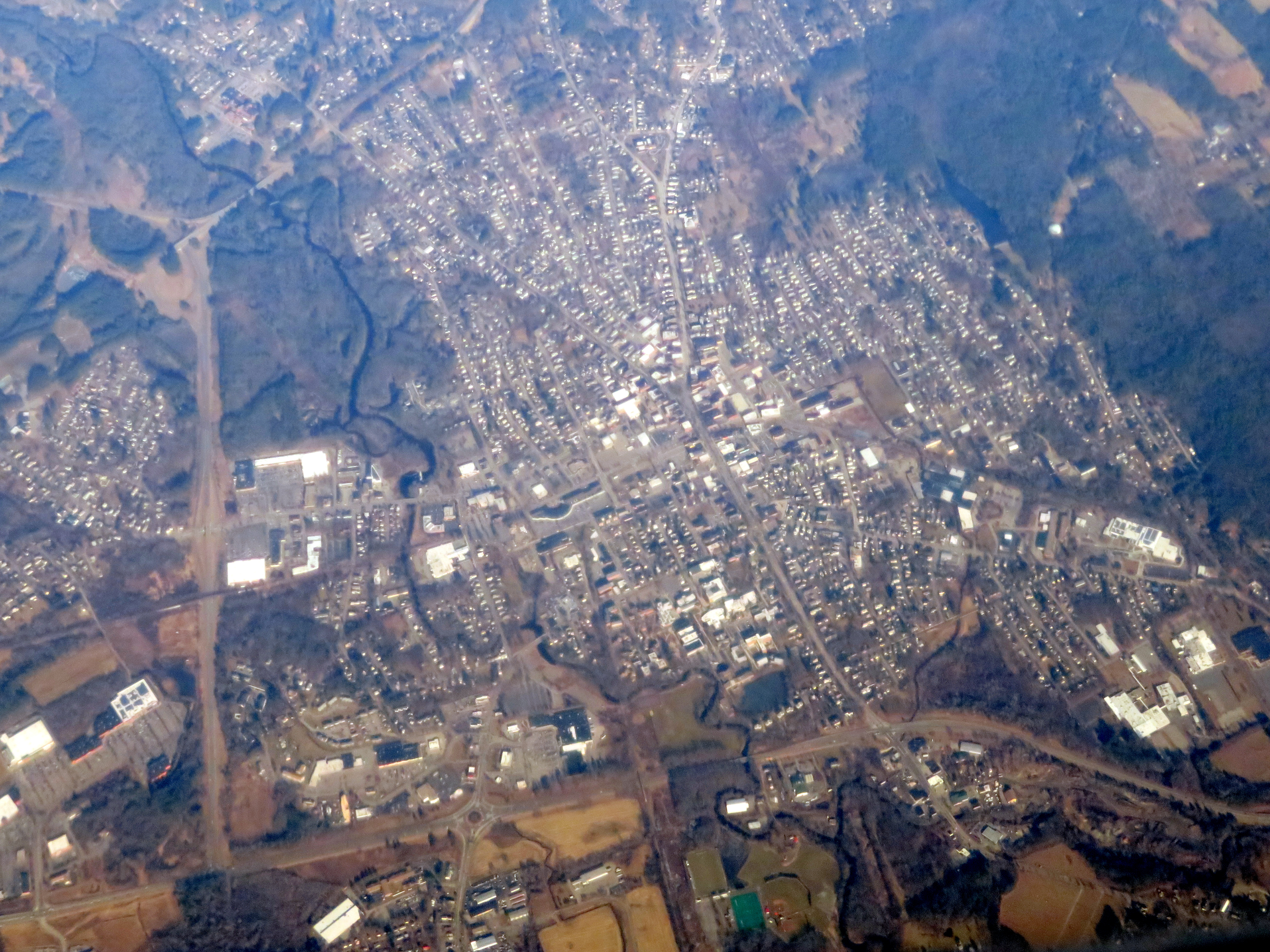
Keene, aerial view, 2018

Keene is located in a humid continental climate zone. It experiences all four seasons quite distinctly. The average high temperature in July is 82 °F (28 °C), and the record high for Keene is 102 °F (39 °C). Extended periods of high humidity can raise heat indices to near 110 °F (43 °C). During the summer, Keene gets hit by thunderstorms coming from the west or northwest. Severe storms are not uncommon. Large hail occurs to the east and northeast of Keene. Tornadoes are also not uncommon. Long-tracked tornadoes touched down on the east side of Keene in 2023 and 2024.

The winters in Keene can be harsh. The most recent such winter was 2002–2003, when Keene received 112.5 inches (2,860 mm) of snow. The majority of the snowfall in Keene comes from nor'easters, areas of low pressure that move up the Atlantic Coast and strengthen. Many times, these storms can produce blizzard conditions across southern New England. Recent examples are the blizzards of 2005 and 2006. Keene is situated in an area where cold air meets the moisture from the south, so often Keene gets the jackpot with winter storms. Aside from snow, winters can be very cold. Even in the warmest of winters, Keene typically experiences at least one night below 0 °F (−18 °C). During January 2004, Keene saw highs below freezing on 25 of the days, including five days in the single digits and one day with a high of zero. Overnight lows dropped below zero 12 times, including seven nights below −10 °F (−23 °C). The record low in Keene is −31 °F (−35 °C). In addition to the cold temperatures, Keene can receive biting winds that drive the wind chill down below −30 °F (−34 °C).

The last significant snowfall typically occurs in early March. At the same time, 80 °F (27 °C) days can begin in late March. Autumn weather is similar. Keene's first snowfall usually occurs in mid-November, though the city can also have 60 °F (16 °C) through November. Significant rain events can occur in the spring and fall. For example, record rainfall and flooding with the axis of heaviest rain (around 12 inches (300 mm)) near Keene occurred in October 2005. Another significant flood event occurred in May of the following year.

Climate data for Keene, New Hampshire (1991–2020 normals, extremes 1893–present)
Month	Jan	Feb	Mar	Apr	May	Jun	Jul	Aug	Sep	Oct	Nov	Dec	Year
Record high °F (°C)	66 (19)	71 (22)	87 (31)	93 (34)	98 (37)	98 (37)	104 (40)	102 (39)	101 (38)	90 (32)	80 (27)	70 (21)	104 (40)
Mean maximum °F (°C)	51.9 (11.1)	54.7 (12.6)	65.9 (18.8)	80.7 (27.1)	87.9 (31.1)	91.5 (33.1)	92.9 (33.8)	91.1 (32.8)	87.9 (31.1)	78.1 (25.6)	66.4 (19.1)	55.3 (12.9)	94.6 (34.8)
Mean daily maximum °F (°C)	30.4 (−0.9)	34.3 (1.3)	43.0 (6.1)	56.6 (13.7)	68.6 (20.3)	76.9 (24.9)	81.9 (27.7)	80.5 (26.9)	73.2 (22.9)	59.8 (15.4)	46.7 (8.2)	35.6 (2.0)	57.3 (14.1)
Daily mean °F (°C)	20.4 (−6.4)	22.8 (−5.1)	31.3 (−0.4)	43.3 (6.3)	54.8 (12.7)	63.8 (17.7)	69.0 (20.6)	67.5 (19.7)	60.1 (15.6)	47.8 (8.8)	36.7 (2.6)	26.7 (−2.9)	45.4 (7.4)
Mean daily minimum °F (°C)	10.4 (−12.0)	11.4 (−11.4)	19.7 (−6.8)	30.1 (−1.1)	41.0 (5.0)	50.7 (10.4)	56.0 (13.3)	54.4 (12.4)	47.0 (8.3)	35.7 (2.1)	26.8 (−2.9)	17.8 (−7.9)	33.4 (0.8)
Mean minimum °F (°C)	−10.2 (−23.4)	−7.9 (−22.2)	0.4 (−17.6)	19.6 (−6.9)	28.4 (−2.0)	38.6 (3.7)	46.7 (8.2)	43.6 (6.4)	33.0 (0.6)	22.6 (−5.2)	12.2 (−11.0)	−1.5 (−18.6)	−13.2 (−25.1)
Record low °F (°C)	−32 (−36)	−35 (−37)	−21 (−29)	1 (−17)	19 (−7)	27 (−3)	34 (1)	27 (−3)	19 (−7)	10 (−12)	−15 (−26)	−29 (−34)	−35 (−37)
Average precipitation inches (mm)	3.12 (79)	2.77 (70)	3.35 (85)	3.39 (86)	3.77 (96)	4.41 (112)	4.49 (114)	4.28 (109)	4.26 (108)	4.86 (123)	3.49 (89)	3.92 (100)	46.11 (1,171)
Average snowfall inches (cm)	15.2 (39)	14.4 (37)	11.0 (28)	2.2 (5.6)	0.0 (0.0)	0.0 (0.0)	0.0 (0.0)	0.0 (0.0)	0.0 (0.0)	0.2 (0.51)	2.4 (6.1)	14.4 (37)	59.8 (152)
Average extreme snow depth inches (cm)	11.1 (28)	14.1 (36)	11.4 (29)	2.1 (5.3)	0.0 (0.0)	0.0 (0.0)	0.0 (0.0)	0.0 (0.0)	0.0 (0.0)	0.6 (1.5)	1.8 (4.6)	7.8 (20)	17.1 (43)
Average precipitation days (≥ 0.01 in)	11.5	9.8	10.6	11.3	13.0	12.0	11.7	10.2	9.5	11.7	11.0	11.7	134.0
Average snowy days (≥ 0.1 in)	7.5	6.8	4.8	1.2	0.0	0.0	0.0	0.0	0.0	0.2	1.7	6.4	28.6
Source: NOAA

== Demographics ==
Historical population
Census	Pop.	Note	%±
1790	1,314		—
1800	1,645		25.2%
1810	1,646		0.1%
1820	1,895		15.1%
1830	2,374		25.3%
1840	2,610		9.9%
1850	3,392		30.0%
1860	4,320		27.4%
1870	5,971		38.2%
1880	6,784		13.6%
1890	7,446		9.8%
1900	9,165		23.1%
1910	10,068		9.9%
1920	11,210		11.3%
1930	13,794		23.1%
1940	13,832		0.3%
1950	15,638		13.1%
1960	17,562		12.3%
1970	20,467		16.5%
1980	21,449		4.8%
1990	22,430		4.6%
2000	22,955		2.3%
2010	23,409		2.0%
2020	23,047		−1.5%
2024 (est.)	23,036		0.0%
U.S. Decennial Census

=== 2020 census ===
As of the 2020 census, Keene had a population of 23,047. The median age was 37.8 years. 16.7% of residents were under the age of 18 and 19.6% of residents were 65 years of age or older. For every 100 females there were 92.8 males, and for every 100 females age 18 and over there were 90.6 males age 18 and over.

89.7% of residents lived in urban areas, while 10.3% lived in rural areas.

There were 9,433 households in Keene, of which 22.8% had children under the age of 18 living in them. Of all households, 37.0% were married-couple households, 21.9% were households with a male householder and no spouse or partner present, and 32.2% were households with a female householder and no spouse or partner present. About 36.1% of all households were made up of individuals and 14.5% had someone living alone who was 65 years of age or older.

There were 10,297 housing units, of which 8.4% were vacant. The homeowner vacancy rate was 1.5% and the rental vacancy rate was 8.6%.

Racial composition as of the 2020 census
Race	Number	Percent
White	20,760	90.1%
Black or African American	302	1.3%
American Indian and Alaska Native	34	0.1%
Asian	529	2.3%
Native Hawaiian and Other Pacific Islander	8	0.0%
Some other race	248	1.1%
Two or more races	1,166	5.1%
Hispanic or Latino (of any race)	673	2.9%

=== 2010 census ===
As of the census of 2010, 23,409 people, 9,052 households, and 4,843 families were residing in the city. The population density was 627.6 inhabitants per square mile (242.3/km^{2}). The 9,719 housing units had an average density of 260.6 per square mile (100.6/km^{2}). The racial makeup of the city was 95.3% White, 0.6% African American, 0.2% Native American, 2.0% Asian, 0.5% some other race, and 1.4% from two or more races. Hispanics or Latinos of any race were 1.6% of the population.

Of the 9,052 households, 23.0% had children under 18 living with them, 39.1% were married couples living together, 10.6% had a female householder with no husband present, and 46.5% were not families. About 31.8% of all households were made up of individuals, and 12.6% were individuals who were 65 or older. The average household size was 2.26, and the average family size was 2.83.

In the city, the age distribution was 16.6% under 18, 24.1% from 18 to 24, 20.6% from 25 to 44, 24.0% from 45 to 64, and 14.7% who were 65 or older. The median age was 34.0 years. For every 100 females, there were 88.3 males. For every 100 females 18 and over, there were 85.8 males.

=== 2010–2014 American Community Survey ===
For the period of 2010 through 2014, the estimated median income for a household in the city was $52,327 and for a family was $75,057. Male full-time workers had a median income of $50,025 versus $39,818 for females. The per capita income for the city was $29,366. About 6.7% of families and 16.5% of the population were below the poverty line, including 16.5% of those under 18 and 11.5% of those 65 or over.

== Government ==
Keene city vote by party in presidential elections
Year	GOP	DEM	Others
2024	32.3% 4,183	65.9% 8,541	1.8% 231
2020	29.1% 3,764	69.2% 8,966	1.7% 222
2016	30.4% 3,831	62.9% 7,932	6.8% 854
2012	28.7% 3,613	69.3% 8,718	2.0% 248
2008	27.6% 3,641	71.5% 9,427	1.0% 126
2004	32.1% 4,004	67.1% 8,378	0.8% 101
2000	36.3% 3,704	57.4% 5,856	6.3% 647
1996	32.1% 2,910	59.7% 5,401	8.2% 742
1992	31.8% 3,257	50.9% 5,210	17.4% 1,779

Keene's government consists of a mayor and a city council, which has 15 members. Two are elected from each of the city's five wards, and five councilors are elected at-large.

In the New Hampshire Senate, Keene is included in the 10th District and is represented by Democrat Donovan Fenton. On the New Hampshire Executive Council, Keene is in the 2nd District and is represented by Democrat Karen Liot Hill. In the United States House of Representatives, Keene is a part of New Hampshire's 2nd Congressional District and is currently represented by Democrat Maggie Goodlander.

Keene is a strongly Democratic-leaning city at the presidential level, as no Republican presidential nominee has carried the city in over two decades.

== Media ==
Several media sources are located in Keene:

=== Print ===
- The Keene Sentinel
- The Monadnock Shopper News
- The Equinox, student newspaper of Keene State College

=== Radio ===
The city has several radio stations licensed by the FCC to Keene:

AM

- WZBK 1220 (Classic Hits, Simulcast of WKVT-FM, Boston Red Sox Radio Affialiate)
- WKBK 1290 (News/Talk), formerly WKNE. Simulcast on W231DV (94.1 FM) and W298BT (107.5 FM).

FM

- WEVN 90.7, operated by New Hampshire Public Radio
- WKNH 91.3, operated by Keene State College
- WSNI 97.7 (Adult Contemporary, Sunny 97). WSNI changed its city of license from Swanzey to Keene in September 2009.
- W256BJ 99.1, (Adult Album Alternative, "The River", // WSNI-HD2, Simulcast of WRSI & WRSY)
- W272DZ 102.3, (Classic Hits, Rewind 92.7 & 102.3, WKVT-FM Simulcast)
- W276CB 103.1, (Classic Country, "WINK Country Classics 103.1", // WINQ-HD2)
- WKNE 103.7 (Hot Adult Contemporary, 103.7 KNE FM)
- W281AU 104.1 (Oldies, Pure Oldies 104.1, WKNE-HD3)
- W288BN 105.5 (Country, Translator of WYRY)
- W293AB 106.5 (News, "All News Radio 106.5 & 99.5", Translator of WTSA-AM) (Former WFYX translator)
- W298BT 107.5 (Simulcast of WKBK / WKNE-HD2) (Formerly EZ FM)

Syndicated programming

- Free Talk Live, a nationally syndicated radio talk show, is based in Keene.

=== Television ===
- Cheshire TV, local cable programming
- WEKW-TV (Digital 18/Virtual 11), New Hampshire Public Television affiliate (PBS)
- When Elderly Attack (season 8)

Keene is part of the Boston television market. Time Warner Cable is the major supplier of cable television programming for Keene. Local stations offered on Time Warner include most major Boston-area and New Hampshire stations (including WEKW), including WMUR (Manchester, NH ABC), as well as WVTA, the Vermont PBS outlet in Windsor, Vermont.

== Education ==
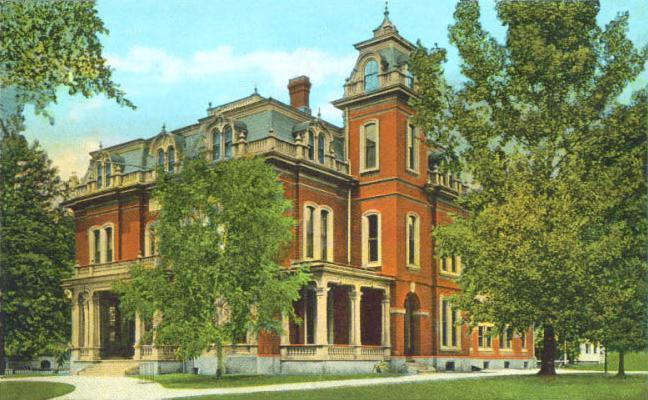
Public Library c. 1920

Keene is often considered a minor college town, as it is the site of Keene State College, whose students make up a substantial portion of the city's population, and Antioch University New England.

At the secondary level, Keene serves as the educational nexus of the area, due in large part to its status as the largest community of Cheshire County. Keene High School is the largest regional high school in Cheshire County, serving about 1,850 students.

Keene has Keene Middle School and as of 2014: Fuller, Franklin, Symonds, and Wheelock Elementary Schools. The former Jonathan Daniels Elementary School was downsized to only preschool and administration offices.

Keene is part of New Hampshire's School Administrative Unit 29, or SAU 29.

== Economy ==
Grocery wholesaler C&S Wholesale Grocers is based in Keene, as is furniture company Whitney Brothers.

== Culture ==
=== Religion ===
Keene has more than 20 churches, mostly Protestant, and one synagogue, Congregation Ahavas Achim. A significant landmark in downtown Keene is the United Church of Christ at Central Square, colloquially known in town as the "White Church" or the "Church at the Head of the Square". A second church on the square was Grace United Methodist Church, also known as the "Brick Church", but it is now privately owned and operated for secular purposes. The Grace United Methodist congregation moved to another site.

Keene is the seat of the Roman Catholic Parish of the Holy Spirit, whose pastor is the Dean of the Monadnock Deanery, a division under the see of the Diocese of Manchester. The parish has two churches in the City of Keene, Saint Bernard and Saint Margaret Mary. Keene has one Episcopal church, Saint James, which is within the Episcopal Diocese of New Hampshire. Keene also has one Greek Orthodox church, Saint George, which is under the see of the Metropolis of Boston.

The Church of Jesus Christ of Latter-day Saints building is home to the Keene Ward and is part of the Nashua, New Hampshire Stake.

=== Festivals ===
==== Pumpkin ====
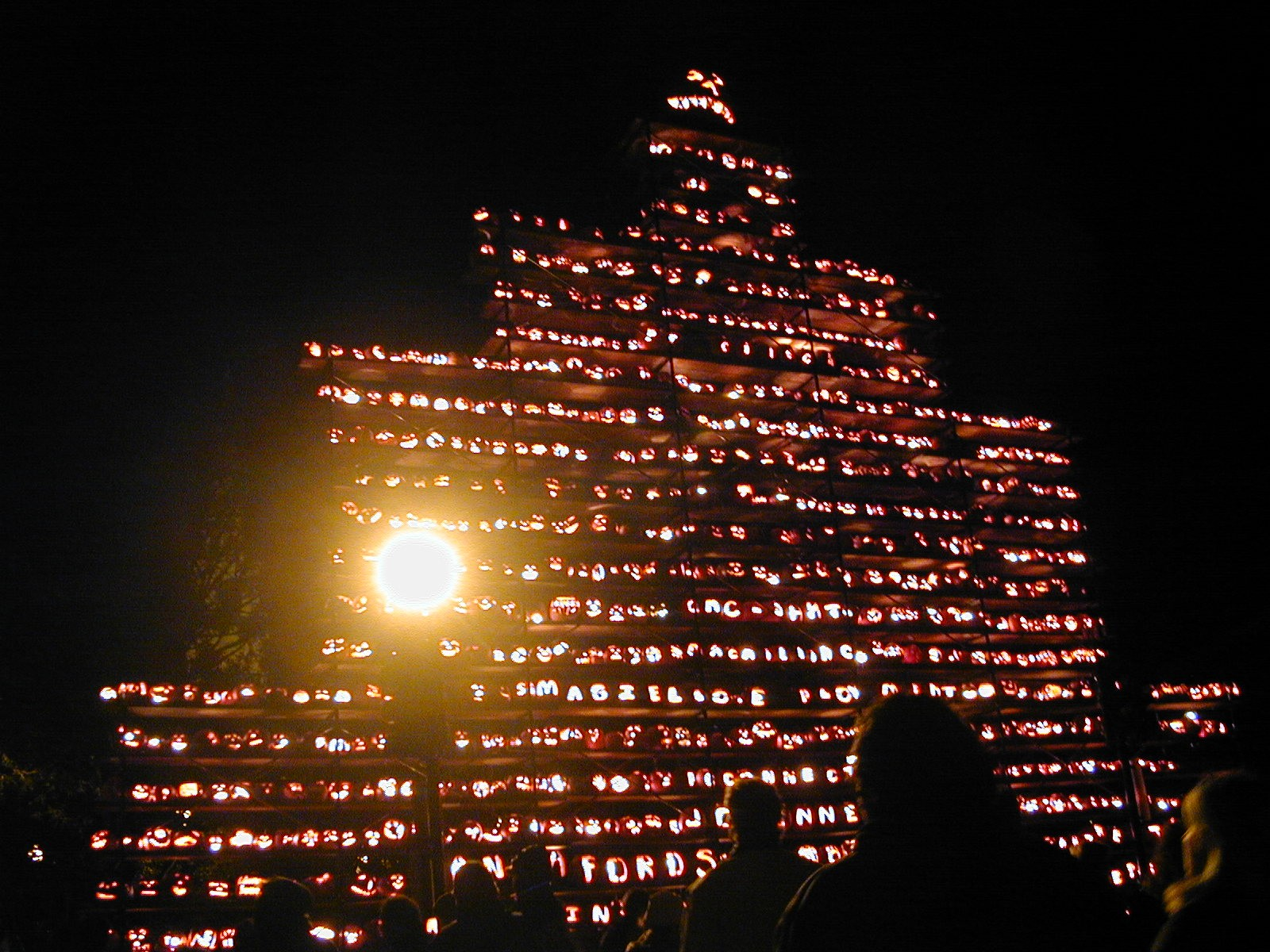
A few of the tens of thousands of pumpkins on display at the 2000 Keene Pumpkin Festival

Every October from 1991 to 2014, Keene hosted an annual pumpkin festival called the Keene Pumpkin Festival, locally known as Pumpkin Fest. The event set world records several times for the largest simultaneous number of jack-o'-lanterns on display. The first time was in 1993, when Keene set the record with nearly 5,000 carved and lit pumpkins. The tally from the 2003 festival stood as the record until Boston took the lead in 2006, but Keene reclaimed the world record in 2013, with a total of 30,581 pumpkins, according to Guinness World Records. Besides the pumpkins stacked on massive towers set in the streets, thousands of additional pumpkins were installed along the streets of the city. Face painting, fireworks, music, and other entertainments were also provided.

After riots from college students nearby the event in 2014, the Keene Pumpkin Festival was moved to Laconia the following year and renamed the New Hampshire Pumpkin Festival. From 2017 onward (except for 2020 and 2021 due to the COVID-19 pandemic), the organizers of the 2011 through 2014 Keene Pumpkin Festivals, along with the 2015 New Hampshire Pumpkin Festival in Laconia, have run a new smaller, child-focused Keene Pumpkin Festival with a number of restrictions in place, promoting it as the "official" continuation of the Keene Pumpkin Festival.

==== Music ====
In late August or early September the city hosts the Keene Music Festival. Several stages are located throughout the downtown area during the day's events, which are free to the public and sponsored by locally owned businesses. Visitors, mostly from the local community, roam the city's sidewalks listening to the dozens of bands.

==== Pride ====
Keene Pride Week and festival take place during the second week of September every year in Downtown Keene. Central Square and parts of Main Street are shut down with over 5,000 people in attendance. It is one of the largest pride festivals in New England and features local, national, and international performers.

=== In popular culture ===
- The 1949 movie Lost Boundaries, starring Mel Ferrer, tells the true story of a black Keene physician who passed as white for many years. The film won the 1949 Cannes Film Festival award for best screenplay.
- Much of the 1995 movie Jumanji, starring Robin Williams, was filmed in Keene in November 1994, as the movie's fictional town of Brantford. Frank's Barber Shop is a featured setting as well as the Parrish Shoe sign, which was painted for the film. The sign served as a focal point for a temporary Robin Williams memorial in the days following the actor's death on August 11, 2014.

=== Music and theatre ===
In 1979, First Lady Rosalynn Carter dedicated the bandstand in Central Square as the E. E. Bagley Bandstand, after the noted composer of the National Emblem March, who made Keene his home until his death in 1922.

Many community groups perform on a regular basis, including the Keene Chamber Orchestra, the Keene Chamber Singers, the Keene Chorale, the Greater Keene Pops Choir, and the Keene Jazz Orchestra. The Monadnock Pathway Singers are an all-volunteer hospice group based in Keene whose members come from many different towns within Cheshire County.

The Keene branch of the Lions Clubs International performs a Broadway musical at the Colonial Theatre (a restored theatre dating back to 1924), to raise money for the community. Other theatres and auditoriums include the new Keene High School Auditorium and the county's largest auditorium, the Larracey Auditorium at Keene Middle School, and The Putnam Arts Lecture Hall on the campus of Keene State. Keene Cinemas is the local movie theater located off of Key Road.

=== Sports ===
Keene is home to the Keene Swamp Bats baseball team of the New England Collegiate Baseball League (NECBL). The Swamp Bats play at Alumni Field in Keene during June and July of each summer. The Swamp Bats are six-time league champions (2000, 2003, 2011, 2013, 2019, and 2025). They are consistently at the top of the NECBL in attendance, having led the league in 2002, 2004, and 2005.

The Elm City Derby Damez roller derby league, members of USA Roller Sports (USARS), call Keene home while playing their officially sanctioned bouts in nearby Brattleboro, Vermont. They compete against many other women's flat track leagues around the northeastern United States.

The Monadnock Wolfpack Rugby Football Club now calls Keene its home. They play in NERFU (New England Rugby Football Union) division IV at Carpenter Field, on Carpenter Street. They will defend their undefeated championship 2018 season in the Fall of 2019.

=== Images ===
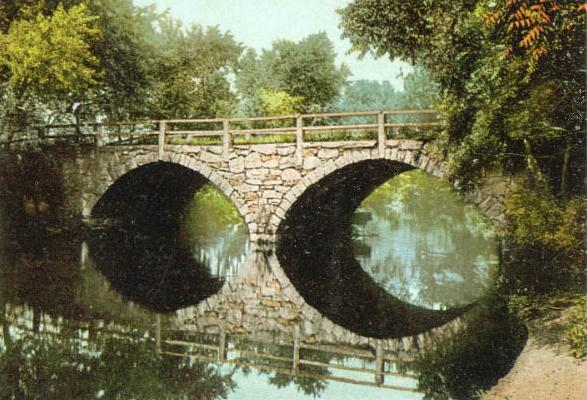
Stone Arch Bridge c. 1906

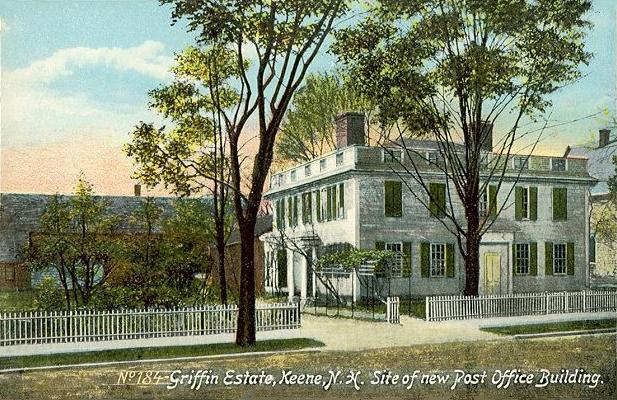
Griffin Estate c. 1908

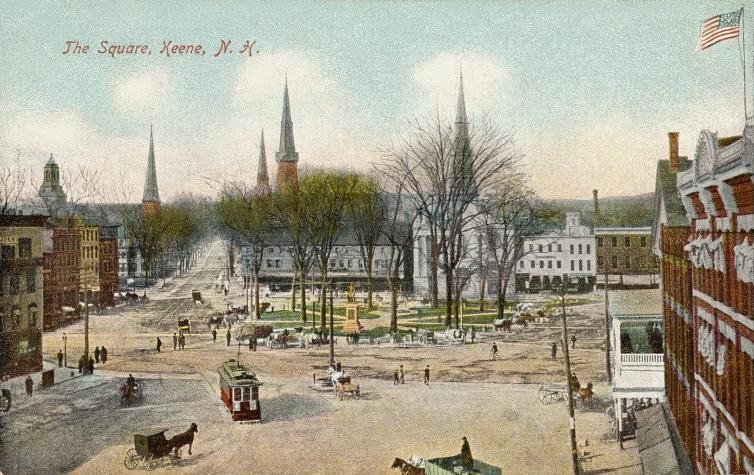
Central Square in 1907

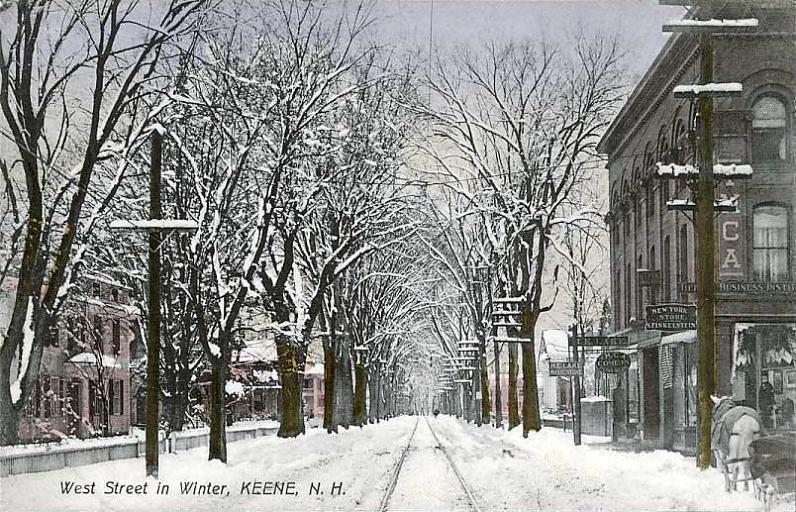
West Street in 1910

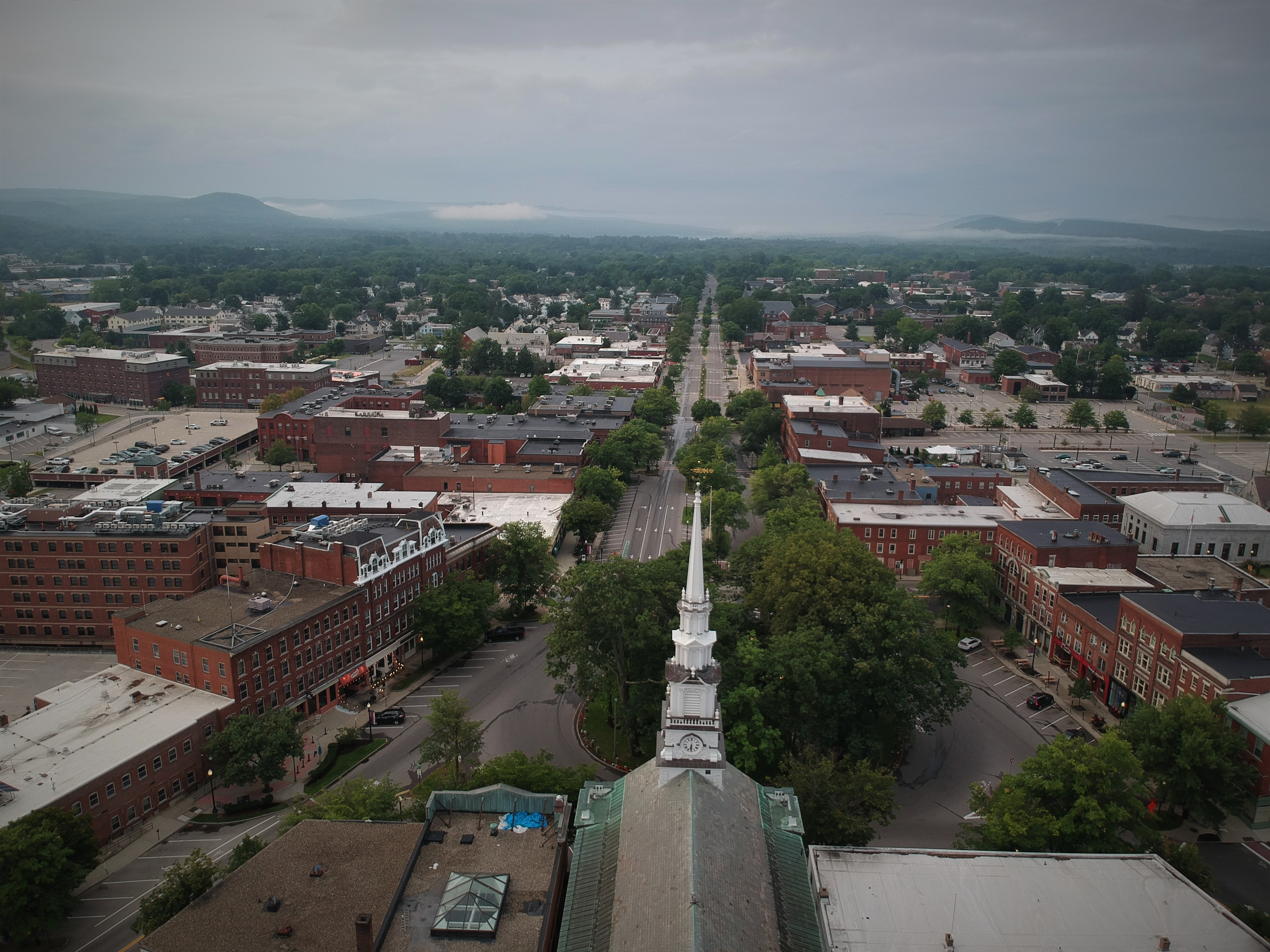
Central Square looking south down Main Street towards Swanzey, NH

=== Free Keene activism ===
The city has become home to an active voluntaryist protest group known as Free Keene, which is associated with the Free State Project. Some Free Keene activists have been arrested for video recording in courtrooms as an act of civil disobedience, in violation of the state's wiretapping law. In 2009, Keene's Central Square Park had become the center of daily 4:20 pm smoke-ins which advocated the legalization of marijuana.

Free Keene has encountered opposition from other Keene residents. While some of the activists' techniques can be relatively confrontational, and the WMUR report mentioned a tongue-in-cheek drinking party at a government building to protest open-container laws, others are significantly less so. For example, a common act by some Free Keene activists involves paying money into expired parking meters to help other citizens avoid parking tickets, which has created conflict between the meter pluggers and the parking enforcement officers. The close encounters with the "Robin Hooders" resulted in one PEO resigning his position and a lawsuit filed by the City of Keene citing harassment of their employees. In December 2013, the judge overseeing the case dismissed the city's arguments against the "Robin Hooders" on first amendment grounds, citing the public sidewalks' role as a traditional public forum.

=== International outreach ===
Einbeck, in Germany, is a partner city.

=== Sites of interest ===
- Dillant–Hopkins Airport

Listed on the National Register of Historic Places:

- Dr. Daniel Adams House
- Beaver Mills
- Cheshire County Courthouse
- Colony House
- Colony's Block
- Noah Cooke House
- Dinsmoor–Hale House
- Elliot Mansion
- Faulkner & Colony Woolen Mill
- Catherine Fiske Seminary For Young Ladies
- Grace United Methodist Church
- Keene Unitarian Universalist Church
- Sawyer Tavern
- Stone Arch Bridge
- United Church of Christ in Keene
- Wyman Tavern

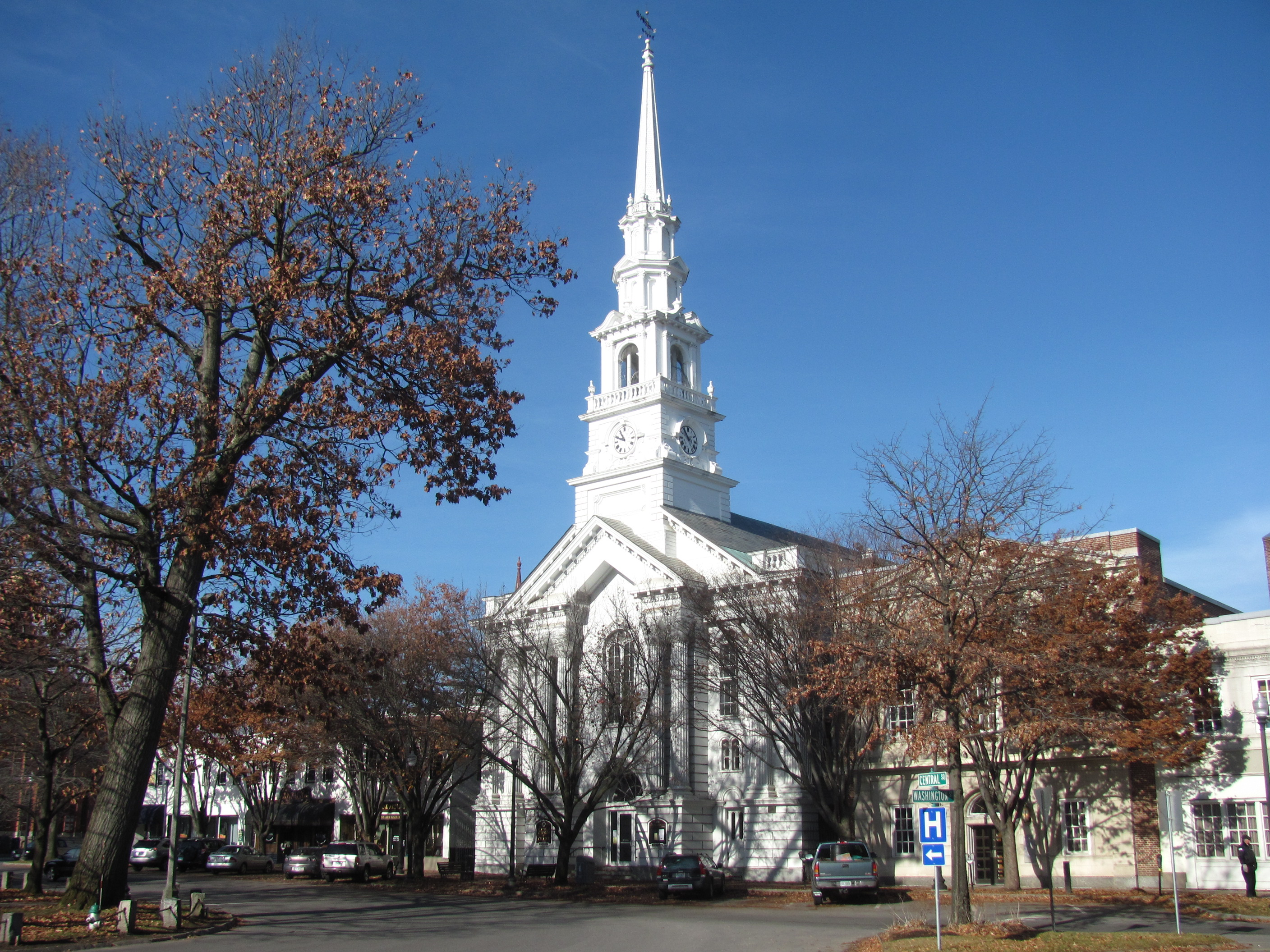
United Church of Christ in Keene

== Notable people ==
- Adam "Adeem" Arnone (born 1978), American rapper
- Edwin Eugene Bagley (1857–1922), composer
- John Bosa (born 1964), defensive lineman with the Miami Dolphins
- Kenneth Bressett (born 1928), longtime editor of A Guide Book of United States Coins
- Francis B. Brewer (1820–1892), U.S. congressman from New York
- Christopher Cantwell (born 1980), white nationalist, federal informant, convicted felon
- Jimmy Cochran (born 1981), Olympic alpine skier
- Richard B. Cohen (born 1952), owner of C&S Wholesale Grocers
- Horatio Colony Jr. (1900–1977), poet, playwright, and businessman
- Jonathan Daniels (1939–1965), activist murdered during the Civil Rights Movement
- Clarence DeMar (1888–1958), seven-time Boston Marathon champion
- John Dickson (1783–1852), U.S. congressman from New York
- Samuel Dinsmoor (1766–1835), fourteenth Governor of New Hampshire
- Joe Dobson, Major League All-Star pitcher, winner of 137 games
- Michael Dubruiel (1958–2009), Catholic author
- Eva Fabian (born 1993), American-Israeli world champion swimmer
- Barry Faulkner (1881–1966), muralist
- Catherine Fiske (1784-1837), founder, Keene Female Seminary
- Tessa Gobbo (born 1990), two-time world champion rower
- Mary Whitwell Hale (1810–1862), founded a school in Keene
- Salma Hale (1787–1866), U.S. congressman from New Hampshire
- Samuel W. Hale (1823–1891), 39th Governor of New Hampshire
- Ernest Hebert (born 1941), author
- Don Joyce (1944–2015) musician, member of Negativland
- A.G. Lafley (born 1947), led Procter & Gamble (P&G) for two separate stints
- Martha Perry Lowe (1829–1902), poet
- David G. Perkins (born 1957), U.S. Army general
- Terry Pindell, travel writer
- Robert Rodat (c. 1960), film and television writer
- Mary Elizabeth Wilson Sherwood (1826–1903), author, socialite
- Duncan Watson (born 1963), former child actor
- Heather Wilson (born 1960), U.S. Secretary of the Air Force
- Isaac Wyman (1724–1792), Revolutionary era soldier, judge
