= Hubert Home Clubs =

Cooperative apartment houses in 1880s New York City

The Rembrandt, completed in 1881, the first successful Home Club, photographed c. 1940

The Hubert Home Clubs were cooperative apartment houses organized in New York City in the 1880s under a plan devised by the French-born architect Philip Gengembre Hubert. Buyers formed an association that bought land and put up a building, and each member held shares entitling them to a renewable lease on an apartment. Units not taken by members were rented out to help cover costs. The first successful club, the Rembrandt on West 57th Street, was completed in 1881. According to Christopher Gray, it was the city's first cooperative apartment building. (Note: Land was first bought at Lexington Avenue and 80th Street for a club aimed at buyers of moderate means, but that project was abandoned, and the Rembrandt became the first club to operate successfully. The historian Sherill Tippins describes the 80th Street building as a completed prototype.)

By 1882 the scheme was "familiarly known as the Hubert Home Clubs", and nearly $10 million had been invested in about a dozen buildings, among them the Chelsea, now the Hotel Chelsea. The eight-building Central Park Apartments, known as the Navarro Flats, went into foreclosure in 1885, and Gray describes its failure, together with stricter building laws, as ending New York's early cooperative boom. As the founder of the Home Clubs, Hubert has been described as the originator of the cooperative apartment house in the United States

== History ==
At the start of the 1880s, New Yorkers who could not afford to buy a house rented one or lived in a boardinghouse. Hubert, a partner with James W. Pirsson in the firm Hubert & Pirsson, (Note: The firm appears as both Hubert & Pirsson and Hubert, Pirsson & Co.) proposed that buyers join together to purchase land and commission their own building, which in his words would let them "obtain small apartments at actual cost, and free from the profits of agents, speculators and middle men". Although he intended the plan for people of limited means, the idea was taken up mainly by the wealthy. He set out the plan in a privately published brochure, Hubert's Home Club Associations, dated to 1879 or 1880.

The system was described as an improvement on the European practice of owning individual floors of a building, as in Scotland, although Gray notes that Hubert left no record of what inspired the plan. Some writers have connected the clubs to the ideas of Charles Fourier, citing their cooperative structure and Hubert's family ties to Fourierism. In 1832 Hubert's father, the architect Colomb Gengembre, had designed an experimental colony for Fourier's followers. The historian Carl Guarneri describes Hubert's ties to Fourierism as "direct and familial", but finds that little of Fourier's plan survived in the clubs.

== Organization ==
The first two clubs, the Rembrandt and the Hubert, began as partnerships under the state's 1848 corporation law and were reorganized as joint-stock companies. An 1881 amendment allowed such companies to buy land and build and so later clubs were formed under the amended law. In his pamphlet, Hubert defined a home club as "an ordinary joint stock company, limited", in which stock entitled the holder to "a virtual perpetual lease of a certain apartment". Members bought shares in proportion to the size of the apartment they wanted and received a fifty-year renewable lease. Apartments not taken by members were rented out, and when that income exceeded running costs the company paid dividends, which by 1882 had reached 12.5 to 25 percent. Gray writes that because most offerings were fully subscribed before building began, Hubert acted more as an intermediary than as a developer.

The founders of each club were described as gentlemen "of congenial tastes, and occupying the same social positions in life", and a member could transfer their lease only to someone acceptable to a majority of the club. The architectural historian Andrew Alpern states that the name "Home Club" was chosen to borrow the prestige of a club while presenting the apartments as permanent homes.

== Services ==
The services offered varied from club to club. Members pooled purchases of coal and other supplies, and buildings shared heating, refuse removal, package delivery and, in some cases, dining facilities. The Chelsea provided far more shared space than Hubert's earlier cooperatives, including dining rooms for residents and a kitchen that also served a public café. Gray identifies the most important innovations of the early cooperatives as the ability to choose one's neighbors, round-the-clock staff, and the ease of closing an apartment while away.

== Buildings ==
In December 1882 the Real Estate Record and Guide listed the clubs completed or under construction. Hubert insisted that every room used for living or sleeping open onto the outside air. Most rose eight to ten stories, at a time when few New York buildings were taller than five.

Hubert Home Clubs
Name	Location	Completed (Note: Sources differ on several dates. An 1898 list of the firm's buildings, arranged by year of completion, gives the Hawthorne as 1883, 121 Madison Avenue as 1884, and the Chelsea as 1885.)	Services and amenities	Notes
Unnamed (abandoned)	Lexington Avenue and East 80th Street			The first planned club, intended for buyers of moderate means; abandoned
The Rembrandt	152 West 57th Street	1881	Elevator staffed by elevator and hall boys; bulk buying of coal and ice and a shared cooking and laundry staff discussed	First successful club; developed by Hubert and the Rev. Jared B. Flagg and aimed partly at artists; site now occupied by Carnegie Hall Tower
The Hawthorne	West 59th Street, between Sixth and Seventh Avenues	1882		Faced Central Park
80 Madison Avenue	Madison Avenue at 28th Street	1882		
The Hubert	West 59th Street, between Broadway and Seventh Avenue	1883	Coal and wood bought in bulk by the company and sold to members	Named for Hubert
121 Madison Avenue	Madison Avenue at 30th Street	1883		Five duplex apartments; converted to rentals in 1940 (Note: Listed in 1882 as No. 120 Madison Avenue.)
The Knickerbocker	Fifth Avenue at 28th Street	1883		Two-story (duplex) apartments; Gray links the design to Ernest Flagg
The Mount Morris	East 130th Street, east of Fifth Avenue	1884		
The Chelsea	222 West 23rd Street	1884	Three dining rooms for residents and a kitchen that also served a public café; ladies' sitting room; roof garden; rooftop infirmary; dumbwaiters and speaking tubes; shared servants housed behind the building	Built as the Chelsea Association Building, with about eighty apartments of widely varying size and price; a residential hotel from the early 1900s, now the Hotel Chelsea
Central Park Apartments (Navarro Flats)	Central Park South at Seventh Avenue	1885	Underground service road for deliveries and refuse; separate passenger and freight elevators; artesian well; top-floor isolation room for contagious patients	Eight buildings developed by José de Navarro, each organized as a separate club on leased land; foreclosed in 1885 and completed as rentals
The Milano	125 West 58th Street	1892		Listed among Hubert's cooperatives; completed later than the other clubs; seven stories
The Berkshire	Madison Avenue at 52nd Street			
The Barrington	East 25th Street, east of Madison Avenue			

== Decline ==
By the mid-1880s some of the cooperatives were in financial trouble. Trade journals were more cautious than the clubs' promoters, and in 1883 the New-York Tribune advised buyers to double the estimates given for running costs. At the Navarro, construction costs exceeded estimates, Hubert had not transferred title to the land to the cooperative corporations, and a lender attached the property. The complex was foreclosed in 1885 and completed as rentals, and some shareholders lost their entire investment. Gray attributes the end of the early cooperative boom to the Navarro failure, more restrictive building laws, and the elevated railways, which eased pressure on land costs. Hubert himself blamed "the law restricting the height of buildings". According to Gray, new multiple dwellings in the city were built as rentals until about 1900.

== Legacy ==
Cooperative apartment building revived in New York after 1903, and the group-ownership arrangement used in the clubs, in which shareholders owned part of a building and rented out the rest, remained common until the 1920s. (Note: According to Gray, an unrelated building known as the Home Club, at 11 East 45th Street, introduced the fully owner-occupied cooperative in 1908.) As of 2004, the Chelsea and 121 Madison Avenue were the only surviving club buildings.

In 1888 the Record and Guide called Hubert "the father of the 'home clubs' in this city", and a 1914 memoir described him as "the originator of the co-operative apartment house in this country".

== See also ==
- Housing cooperative
- Hotel Chelsea
