= Lattice Cottage =

Historic house in New Hampshire, United States

- U.S. National Register of Historic Places
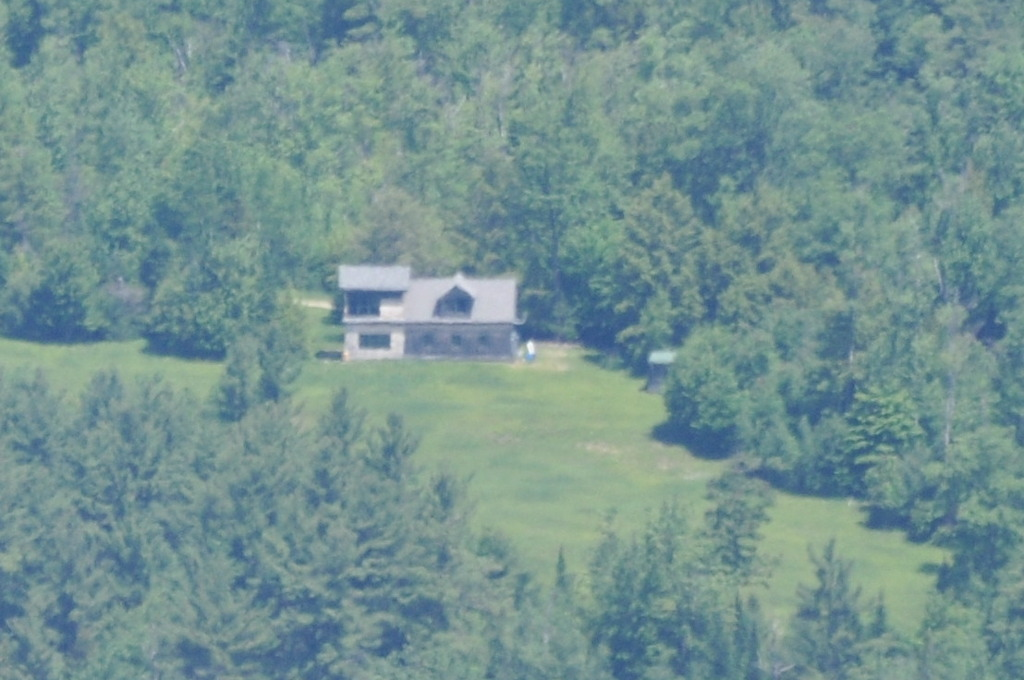
- As seen from the Pumpelly Ridge on Mount Monadnock

- Location within New Hampshire Location within the United States
- Location: Off Old Troy Rd., Dublin, New Hampshire
- Coordinates: 42°53′31″N 72°5′38″W
- Area: 0.6 acres (0.24 ha)
- Built: 1929
- Architect: Little, Harry
- Architectural style: English Gothic
- MPS: Dublin MRA
- NRHP reference No.: 83004040
- Added to NRHP: December 15, 1983

The Lattice Cottage is a historic summer house on the slopes of Mount Monadnock in Dublin, New Hampshire, United States. Built as an estate guest house in 1929 to a design by Harry Little of Boston, Massachusetts, it is a distinctive example of Arts and Crafts architecture.

== Description and history ==
The Lattice Cottage is located on the grounds of the former Amory country estate, a large tract of land rising on the northern slope of Mount Monadnock between Old Troy Road to the west and the mountain's Pumpelly Ridge to the east. It is accessed via a private road that snakes across the historic estate. It stands in a grassy clearing east of the site of the estate's main house (no longer extant). It is a 1 1/2-story wood-frame structure with a significant stone base, with a steeply pitched gabled roof and exterior finished in wooden shingles and brick. It has a busy roof line, with multiple gables and dormers, and its windows are predominantly diamond-pane casements.

The cottage was designed by Boston architect Harry Little of Little & Robb, and built in 1929 as a guest house for Mrs. William Amory as part of her extensive estate. It is set on the foundation of an early 19th-century farmhouse. The cottage has a strong English Arts and Crafts style, reminiscent of a Cotswold cottage, with extensive use of stone and slate. It was one of the last significant estate outbuildings to be built in Dublin before the Great Depression.

== See also ==
- Amory House
- Amory-Appel Cottage
- Amory Ballroom
- National Register of Historic Places listings in Cheshire County, New Hampshire
