= Amory House =

Historic house in New Hampshire, United States

- U.S. National Register of Historic Places
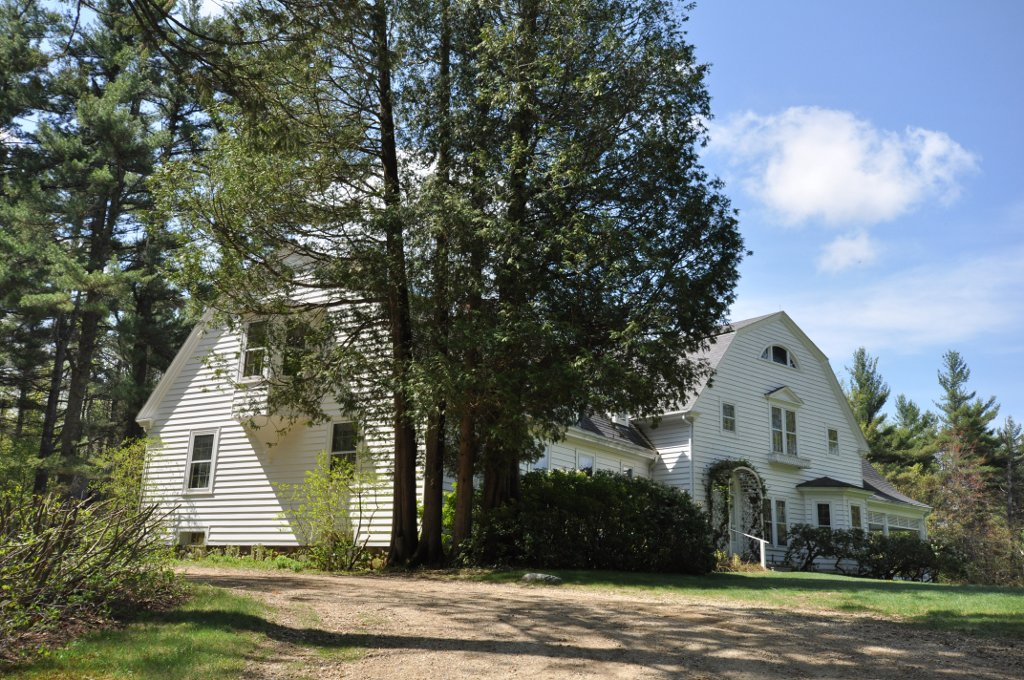

- Location within New Hampshire Location within the United States
- Location: Off Old Troy Rd., Dublin, New Hampshire
- Coordinates: 42°53′38″N 72°6′0″W
- Area: 1.4 acres (0.57 ha)
- Built: 1898
- Architect: Lavalle, John
- Architectural style: Colonial Revival
- MPS: Dublin MRA
- NRHP reference No.: 83004006
- Added to NRHP: December 15, 1983

The Amory House is a historic house on the slopes of Mount Monadnock, on a private drive off Old Troy Road in Dublin, New Hampshire. Built in 1898–99, it is a distinctive local example of a Dutch Colonial Revival summer country house. The house was listed on the National Register of Historic Places in 1983.

== Description and history ==
The Amory House is located on the grounds of the former Amory country estate, a large tract of land rising on the northern slope of Mount Monadnock between Old Troy Road to the west and the mountain's Pumpelly Ridge to the east. It is accessed via a private road that snakes across the historic estate. The house is a rambling 2 1/2-story wood-frame structure, with multiple gambrel roof gables and a clapboarded exterior. Some of the gables are adorned with half-round three-part windows, while one has an oriel window at its center. A screened porch with round columns provides a fine view to the west. A carriage house with similar styling stands nearby.

The house was built 1898–99 to a design by Boston architect John Lavalle. It was built for Boston businessman William Amory, who died in 1900; his wife Louise built a much larger Italian villa nearby in 1910-11 (of which only the ballroom survives), and rented this house out. Notable occupants of the house include United States Senator Albert J. Beveridge and historian Henry Adams.

== See also ==
- Amory-Appel Cottage, former chauffeur's house
- Lattice Cottage, guest house
- National Register of Historic Places listings in Cheshire County, New Hampshire
