= Christ Lutheran Church (Baltimore) =

Christ Lutheran Church, Baltimore

Christ Lutheran Church (Inner Harbor)
- Christ Lutheran Church (Inner Harbor)
- 39°16′50.887″N 76°36′49.324″W
- Location: Baltimore, Maryland
- Address: 701 South Charles St., Baltimore, MD, 21230
- Country: United States
- Language: English
- Denomination: Evangelical Lutheran Church in America (ELCA)
- Website: https://www.christinnerharbor.org/

History
- Former name: Christ English Lutheran Church
- Founded: Dec. 18, 1887
- Founder: Leander M. Zimmerman
- Dedication: May 18, 1958

Architecture
- Functional status: Active
- Architect: Philip H. Frohman
- Style: English Collegiate Gothic

Clergy
- Pastor(s): Rev. Dr. Amsalu Geleta, Rev. David Asendorf, Rev. Douglas Jones

Christ Lutheran Church (also known as Christ Inner Harbor) is a congregation of the Evangelical Lutheran Church in America (ELCA) in the Inner Harbor neighborhood of Baltimore, Maryland, United States.

== History ==
Founded to serve English-speaking Lutherans in the largely immigrant German neighborhoods of South Baltimore, the congregation held its first service on December 18, 1887, in Triumph Hall at 1240 Light Street. It was led by the first pastor, the Rev. Dr. Leander Zimmerman, who had been sent by the Lutheran Board of Home Missions. Advertising the church under the motto "Every seat free — Everybody welcome", Zimmerman rejected the then-common practice of charging pew rents. Under his leadership, the church grew rapidly, and by his retirement in 1925 it was the largest Lutheran congregation in the city, with about 2,000 members.

Zimmerman was succeeded by seven senior pastors:

- Oscar F. Blackwelder (1925-1933),
- John L. Deaton (1934-1960),
- Warren C. Johnson (1961-1964),
- Carl W Folkemer (1965-1982),
- John R. Sabatelli (1983-2012),
- Susan Tjornehoj (2012-2019), and
- Amsalu T. Geleta (2021-present).

Blackwelder worked to professionalize the church's management and was remembered as a powerful preacher. He later became pastor of the Lutheran Church of the Reformation in Washington, D.C., where he was invited to preach before President Franklin D. Roosevelt and Prime Minister Winston Churchill.

The congregation experienced a second period of growth during the mid-20th-century high tide of Mainline Protestantism, under the leadership of John L. Deaton. The church committed to the downtown site, even as many other white Protestant congregations fled to the suburbs, and during his tenure Deaton oversaw the construction of a parish house (1935-6) and a new sanctuary (1955-58). Representative Edward A. Garmatz read Theodore McKeldin's "Memorial to the Reverend John L. Deaton" into the Congressional Record of the First Session 87th Congress on June 26, 1961.

Johnson's tenure was brief and contentious. He pushed the congregation to be more proactive in serving the surrounding community. The official histories written or researched during the Folkemer era gloss over the reasons for his sudden departure, but Folkemer's own biography of Johnson is more illuminating: it relates how he lost a congregational vote to fund a "Lutheran Social Services" organization and tendered his resignation.

Folkemer was a homegrown son of the church, and he understood how to realize the potential that Johnson saw in it. On June 14, 1965, Rep. Garmatz read McKeldin's address of greeting upon the "Installation of Dr. Carl W. Folkemer" into the Congressional Record of the First Session of the 89th Congress, and a few months later, on August 11, 1965, he read the entire text of Folkemer's sermon "Let Freedom Ring" into the Record as well.

Through Folkemer's efforts, the church's footprint extended significantly beyond its walls: a 220-bed John L. Deaton Hospital and Medical Center opened in 1971, and a 288-unit Christ Church Harbor Apartments on Light Street for low- and moderate-income seniors opened in 1974. He credited Johnson for opening "up to the congregation the possibilities of service to others, outside themselves."

During Sabatelli's pastorate, the church continued to expand its initiatives. The Lutheran Center at Christ Church, headquarters for Lutheran World Relief and Lutheran Immigration and Refugee Services, opened in 1991, and the nonprofit Baltimore Outreach Services, which provided shelter, food, and clothing for homeless women and their children, was incorporated in 2002.

== Building ==
The congregation first worshipped in rented quarters at Triumph Hall at 1240 Light St. The next year, in 1888, it bought the former New Sailor's Bethel Methodist Episcopal Church at Hill and Charles Streets.

In time, the congregation outgrew the building, which had fallen into disrepair. The Leander M. Zimmerman Parish House, designed by Philip H. Frohman, the architect of the Washington National Cathedral, was built in 1935–36 to meet its needs. The parish house contained a hall seating over 700, twenty-two classrooms, and a children's chapel behind an English Collegiate Gothic exterior, and it remains in use today.

Frohman also designed the present sanctuary, seating 1,028, in the Gothic style to harmonize with the parish house. Built in 1955–58 at a reported cost of more than $1 million, it features a Great Christus Gloriosus, window above the altar at the front, a series of stained glass windows depicting Old and New Testament themes along the sides, and a rose window at the rear.

== Social Ministry ==
Christ Lutheran Church immediately involved itself in providing social services to the surrounding community. Zimmerman was a founding member, and later vice-president, of the Baltimore chapter of the Lutheran Deaconess Movement, which focused on nursing, education, and social welfare. Until 1961, the chapter detailed "parish sisters" to the church.

In 1935, the church's library, which had supplied the neighborhood with religious and secular literature, was folded into the Enoch Pratt Free Library system.

During the mid-20th century, the neighborhood around the church was cleared for redevelopment of Baltimore's Inner Harbor. The redevelopment coincided with white flight to the suburbs, and many other white Protestant churches followed their membership. Deaton led Christ Lutheran Church to stay downtown, declaring, "God placed us here...and wants us to remain here."

During Folkemer's tenure, the church built a social-ministry complex on its campus. This included the John L. Deaton Medical Center with the help of a $1 million loan from the Maryland Board of Public Works - cited as the first building opened in the Inner Harbor renewal - and the Christ Church Apartments. Later ministries, while Sabatelli served as senior pastor, included Meals on Wheels, a soup kitchen, and a shelter for homeless women and their children, which grew into the nonprofit Baltimore Outreach Services.

The John L. Deaton Medical Center was opened with 220 beds in 1973. It was expanded in 1986 to add 120 beds. The center was sold to the University of Maryland Medical System (UMMS) in July, 1996. The Christ Church Foundation was established from the sale of the center for $10.8 million.

== Church Archives ==
Zimmerman and Folkemer, two of the Church's senior priests, worked to archive the congregational history of the church.

A congregational history was commissioned from a local Baltimore historian, Ron Thomas, who relied on the research notes of Gloria Paar, an assistant to Folkemer. An undated companion booklet with a pictorial record was also produced.

These have been digitized, along with a wide variety of other materials, in partnership with the Internet Archive (archive.org). They are available to view here:

- Christ Lutheran Church archive on Internet Archive

Earliest Records:

- Sunday school class record book (1888-1891)
- Minute book of the Leander M. Zimmerman Glee Club (1893-1893)
- Original Certificate of Incorporation (1889) and Church Council minute book (1895-1902)

Zimmerman's commemorative anniversary reflections:

- Twentieth Anniversary, Christ Lutheran Church, Baltimore, MD (1907)
- Looking Backward Over Forty Years (1927)

Folkemer's biographies and congregational history:

- Zimmerman biography (final and draft versions)
- Blackwelder biography (final and draft versions)
- Deaton biography (final and draft versions)
- Johnson biography (final and draft versions)
- Folkemer biography (final and draft versions)
- Christ Lutheran Church - 85th Anniversary, December 10, 1972

The 100th Anniversary booklet:

- The Christ Church Story (1987)

Thomas' official congregational history:

- A History of Christ Lutheran Church of Baltimore (2001)

Other noteworthy archival materials:

- "Service of Dedication for the Leander M. Zimmerman Parish House" (1936) (with an introduction by Philip Frohman)
- "That Thy Name Be Glorified" (a building-fund prospectus for the contemporary sanctuary designed by Philip Frohman)
- "Architectural Study of Christ Lutheran Church, Baltimore, Maryland" (1964) by Ralph R. Welsh
- "Let Freedom Ring" - sermon by Carl Folkemer, an Extension of Remarks read into the Congressional record by Edward A. Garmatz on Wednesday, August 11, 1965

== Present Day ==
The congregation continues as Christ Church Inner Harbor, an urban parish retaining its founding commitment to service on Baltimore's waterfront, under the leadership of the Rev. Dr. Geleta.

- An Informal Worship service is held in the Fellowship Hall on Sunday mornings at 9:00 AM.
- A Traditional Worship service featuring a choir and Andover pipe organ is held in the main sanctuary on Sunday mornings at 11:00 AM.

Christ Lutheran Learning Center, a licensed preschool running programs for 2, 3, and 4 year-olds, operates out of the church building.
