= Amory-Appel Cottage =

Historic house in New Hampshire, United States

- U.S. National Register of Historic Places
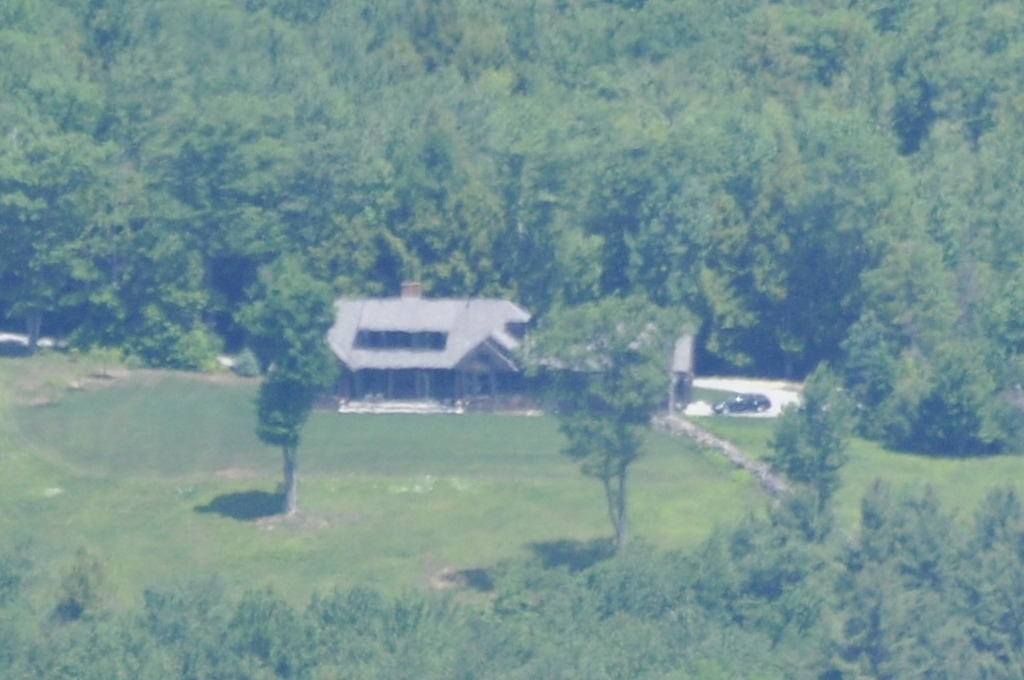
- As seen from the Pumpelly Ridge of Mount Monadnock

- Location within New Hampshire Location within the United States
- Location: Off Old Troy Rd., Dublin, New Hampshire
- Coordinates: 42°53′36″N 72°5′42″W
- Area: 0.4 acres (0.16 ha)
- Built: 1911
- Architect: Parsons, Wait & Goodell; Cabot, T. Handasyd
- Architectural style: Colonial Revival, Shingle Style, Georgian Revival
- MPS: Dublin MRA
- NRHP reference No.: 85000920
- Added to NRHP: May 2, 1985

The Amory-Appel Cottage is a historic house on the upland slopes of Mount Monadnock in Dublin, New Hampshire. Built in 1911 as a garage and chauffeur's house, it was remodeled c. 1954 into a Shingle style summer house. The building was listed on the National Register of Historic Places in 1985.

== Description and history ==
The Amory-Appel Cottage is located on the grounds of the former Amory country estate, a large tract of land rising on the northern slope of Mount Monadnock between Old Troy Road to the west and the mountain's Pumpelly Ridge to the east. It is accessed via a private road that snakes across the historic estate. It stands in a grassy clearing east of the site of the estate's main house (no longer extant). It is a 1 1/2-story wood-frame structure, with a steeply pitched gabled roof and exterior finished in wooden shingles. The roof is pierced by small gabled dormers, and a square brick chimney rises above it. Most windows are small-paned sash.

The cottage was built about 1911 to a design by Charles Goodell of Parsons, Wait & Goodell, originally to serve as a garage and chauffeur's residence for the Amorys. About 1954, Thomas Handasyd Cabot, a local builder-designer, remodeled it, replacing the original stone chimney with one of brick. It has elements of Shingle and Arts and Crafts styling reminiscent of the early work of Frank Lloyd Wright. At the time of its National Register listing in 1985, it was owned by a grandson of Louise Amory, the estate's principal developer.

== See also ==
- Amory House
- Amory Ballroom
- Lattice Cottage
- National Register of Historic Places listings in Cheshire County, New Hampshire
