= Frances Raymond (died 1901) =

American actress (1868/1869 - 1901)

Frances Raymond (1868 or 1869 — June 23, 1901) was an American actress and author. She was also known as Minnie Raymond and Martha Schaffer.

== Early years ==
Raymond was the daughter of Frederick Lapzieu (or Friedrich Lapzien) of Brooklyn. She and her two sisters attended Brooklyn schools.

== Career ==
Raymond's acting career ended in 1894. She acted with the Frohman road companies and had been performing in The Girl I Left Behind Me in Memphis when she and the management parted ways. Management of Charles Frohman's company said that she had been incompetent, while she said that she angered a company official by resisting his advances. Turning from acting to writing, Raymond spent almost three years working on a novel, Maylou, which the G. W. Dillingham Company published in 1897. Critics attacked the book's plot and style, compounding its lack of success while creating "a sort of ephemeral notoriety" for it. That lack of success led to her becoming "melancholy and morose".

== Personal life ==
Around 1891 Raymond married a Chicago lawyer whose last name was Schaffer. They were divorced within about 18 months. In 1892, Raymond married businessman Franklin Raymond Wallace, who was said to be a millionaire involved in mining ventures in the western United States. Some time later "she discovered that Wallace was a married man with a daughter nearly as old as herself." He settled a lawsuit that she had filed by promising to pay her $100 per month. By 1896, she said that he had stopped those payments. Therefore, she sued him for $50,000. Later, Raymond felt deserted by a young doctor whom she had "loved deeply" after he had paid "marked attention" to her for two years before telling her that he intended to marry someone else.

== Death ==
On June 23, 1901, Raymond died of asphyxiation in her New York apartment, aged 32. She committed suicide by inhaling gas in her New York City apartment after she had closed off the keyhole and the space under the door and removed three of the chandelier's four gas burners.
