= Harry Little (architect) =

American architect (1882–1944)

Harry B. Little
- Born: July 18, 1882; Hingham, Massachusetts, United States
- Died: April 4, 1944 (aged 61); Concord, Massachusetts, United States
- Occupation: Architect

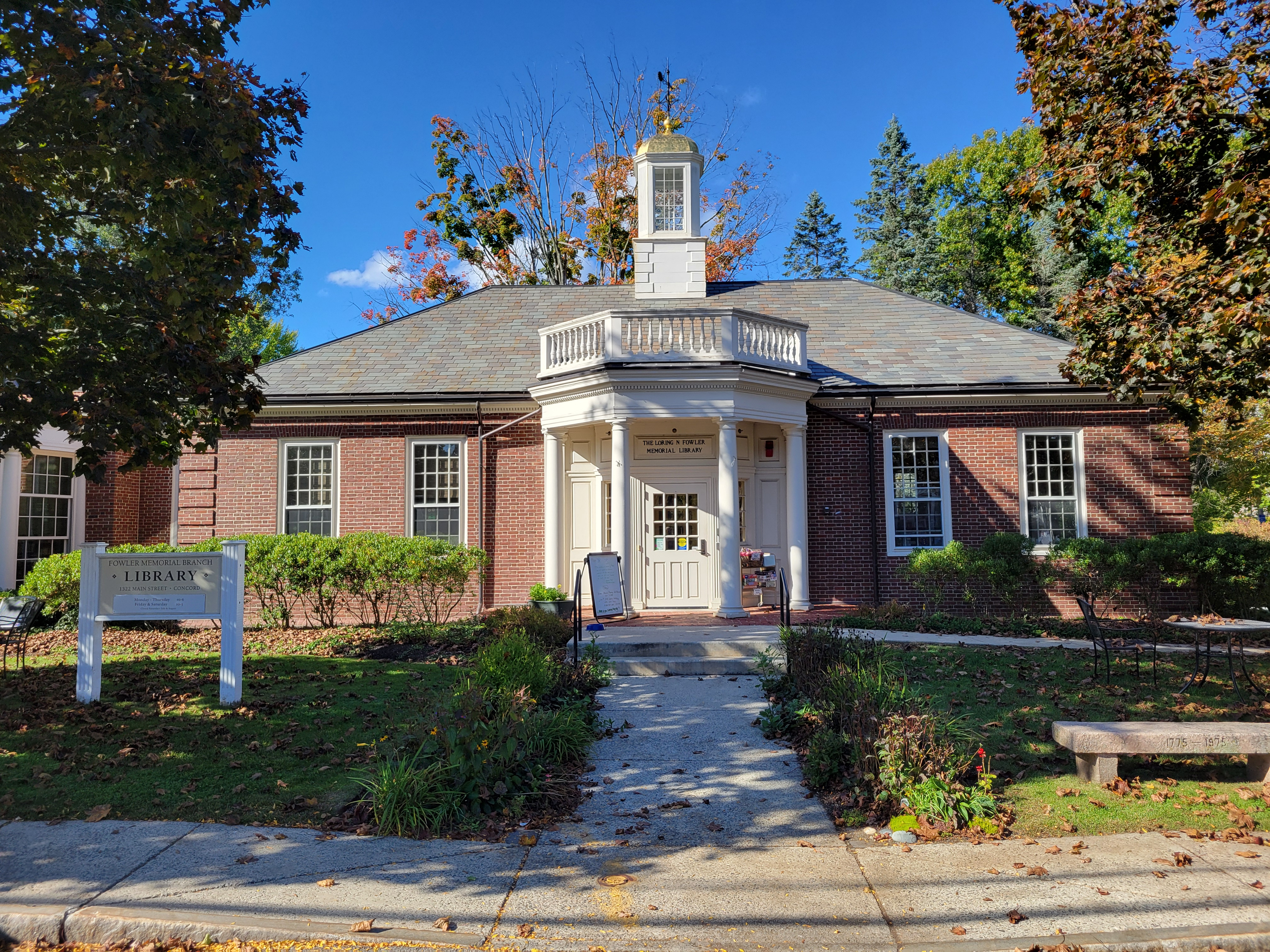
The Fowler branch of the Concord Free Public Library, designed by Little in the Colonial Revival style and completed in 1930.

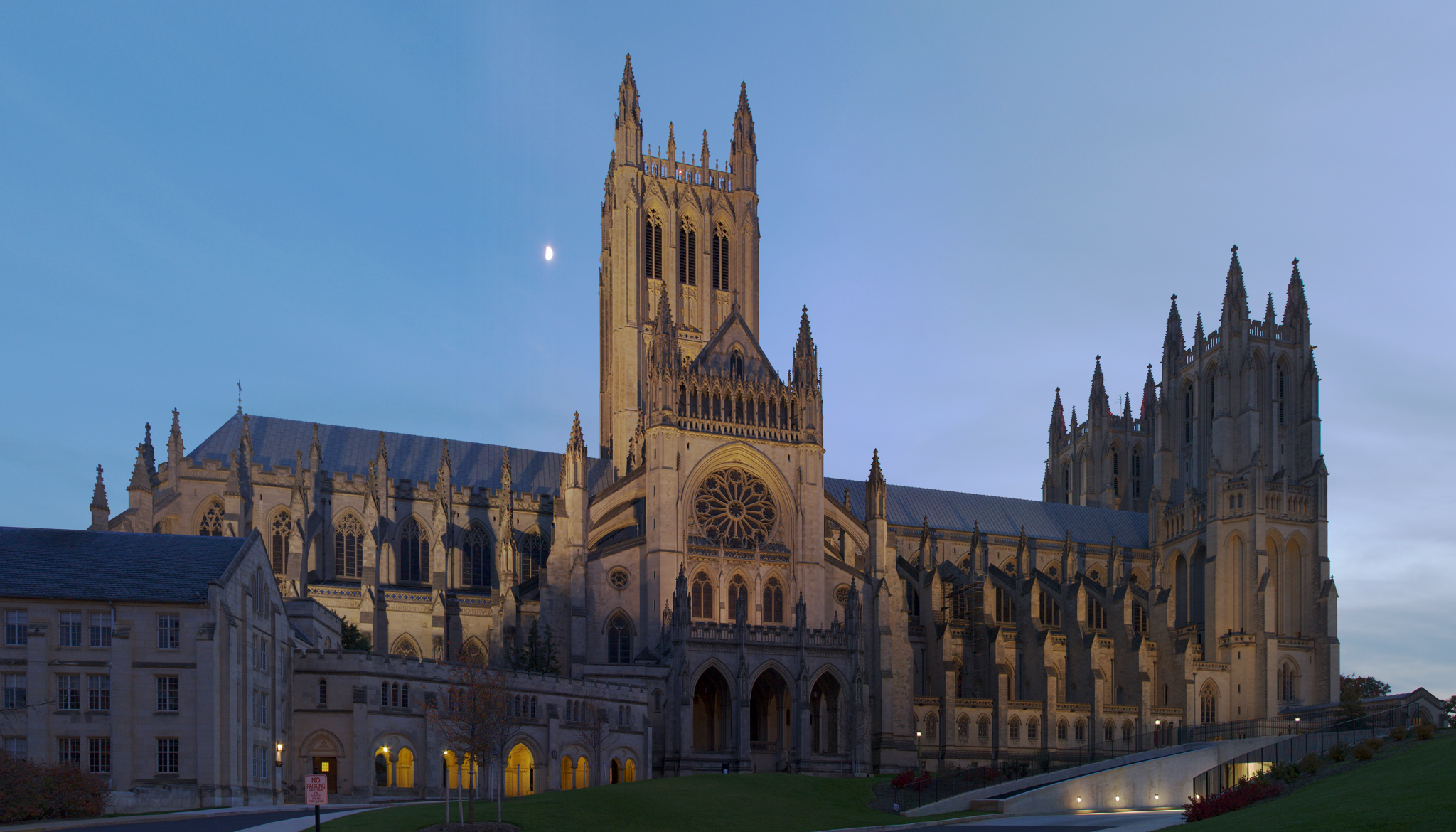
The Washington National Cathedral, on which Frohman, Robb and Little worked until their deaths. At the time of Little's death in 1944 the north transept (center) and choir (left) had been completed.

Harry B. Little (August 18, 1882 – April 4, 1944) was an American architect during the early twentieth century. In 1920, Little formed a partnership with Philip H. Frohman and E. Donald Robb. Together they gained national recognition as architects for the Washington National Cathedral. They also worked on other major works such as the Episcopal Cathedral in Baltimore and the chapel of Trinity College, Hartford.

== Life and career ==
Harry Britton Little was born August 18, 1882, in Hingham, Massachusetts, to George B. Little and Ella Little, née Walworth. He graduated from Harvard University in 1904 with an AB and later went on to the Beaux-Arts de Paris, where he studied in the atelier of Eugène Duquesne in 1909 and 1910. After his return to the United States he joined the office of Cram & Ferguson, and was responsible for the working drawings created for the nave of the Cathedral of St. John the Divine in New York City. When construction on the cathedral was halted in 1916 Little left Cram and went out on his own.

He worked independently until 1920, when he merged his practice with Frohman & Robb, the partnership of Philip H. Frohman and E. Donald Robb, to form Frohman, Robb & Little. In 1921 the firm was appointed architect for the Washington National Cathedral, with Frohman as resident partner in Washington. All three partners were closely involved in the cathedral project, which reached a major milestone in 1932 with the completion of the choir and north transept. As at New York, Little was particularly associated with the working drawings.

In 1928, the formal partnership of Frohman, Robb & Little was dissolved. The former partners continued to practice under the name "Frohman, Robb & Little, Associated Architects," and continued to work in partnership on the cathedral and on other projects as they saw fit. One other project completed by the three was the Trinity College Chapel (1932) in Hartford, Connecticut. William Morgan, biographer of Henry Vaughan, whom Frohman, Robb & Little succeeded at the cathedral, characterizes the Trinity College Chapel specifically and their Gothic work generally as "correct, but somehow mechanical, even cold. Frohman, Robb and Little saw the cathedral as their greatest work and continued to work on it until their deaths in 1972, 1942 and 1944, respectively.

Little is now primarily identified with the works of the firm completed in Concord, Massachusetts, his wife's hometown. There, he reinforced the use of the Colonial Revival style as the most appropriate architecture for the town. His first work in the town was Littleholme (1914), his family home. His major Concord works include the Trinitarian Congregational Church (1926), the Concord Museum (1930), the Fowler branch of the Concord Free Public Library (1930) and the reconstruction of the library proper (1934).

== Personal life and death ==
Little was married in 1911 to Miriam Barrett of Concord, Massachusetts. They had two children, one son and one daughter. He was a member of the American Institute of Architects, Boston Art Club, Boston Society of Architects, St. Botolph Club and the Harvard Club of New York City. He died April 4, 1944, at home in Concord at the age of 62.
