= 146–156 East 89th Street =

Houses in Manhattan, New York

- Houses at 146–156 East 89th Street
- U.S. National Register of Historic Places
- New York State Register of Historic Places
- New York City Landmark
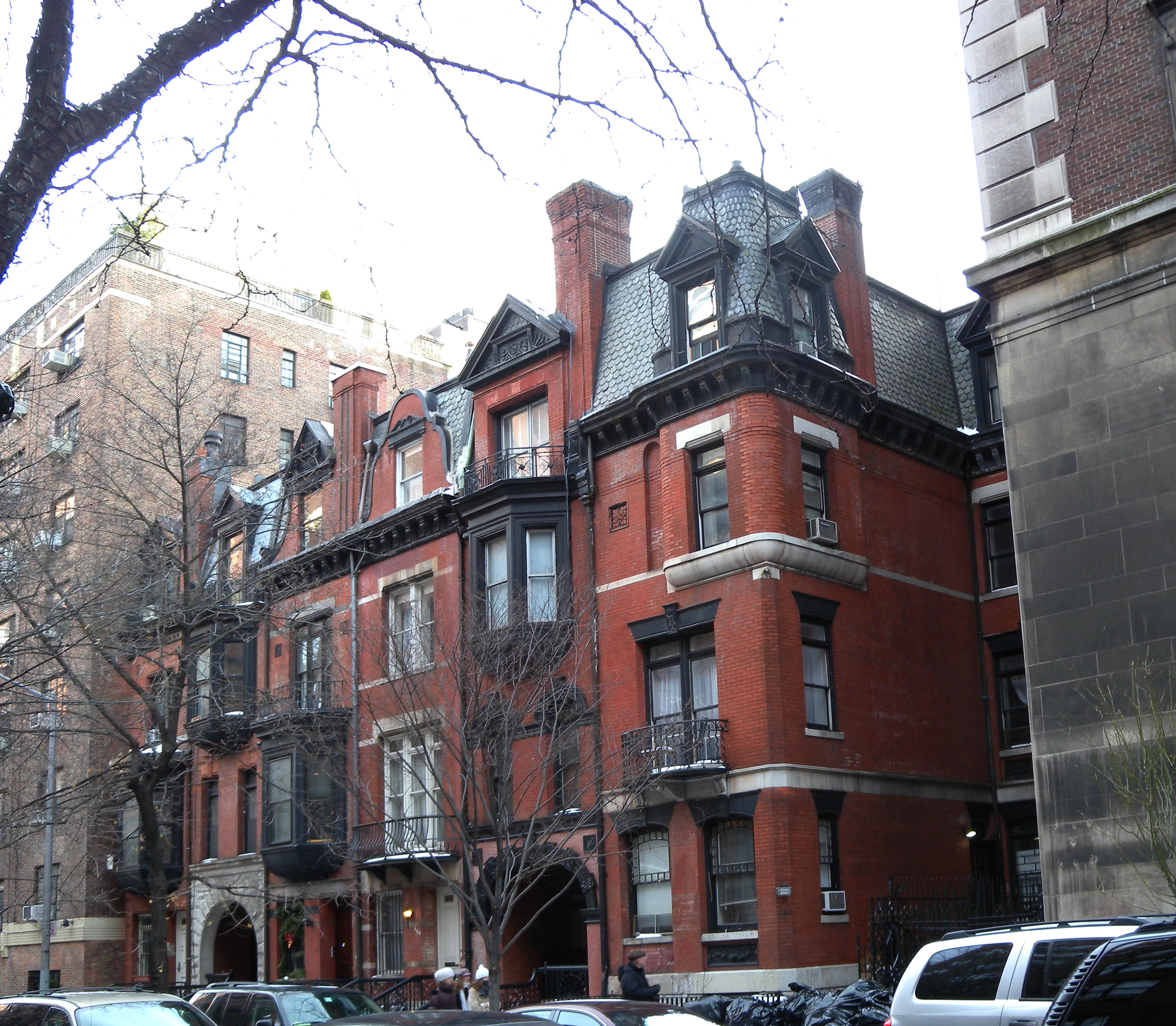
- Location: 146–156 E. 89th St., New York, New York
- Coordinates: 40°46′52″N 73°57′15″W
- Area: less than one acre
- Built: 1886
- Architect: Hubert, Pirrson & Company
- Architectural style: Queen Anne
- NRHP reference No.: 82003378
- NYSRHP No.: 06101.004535 – 06101.004540
- NYCL No.: 1004–1009

Significant dates
- Added to NRHP: 1982-06-03
- Designated NYSRHP: 1982-04-09
- Designated NYCL: 1979-03-13

146–156 East 89th Street are a group of six Queen Anne style houses on the Upper East Side of Manhattan in New York City, New York, US. They were originally part of a group of ten designed by Hubert, Pirrson & Company in the Queen Anne style. The houses were constructed by developer William Rhinelander in 1886–1887. The houses share materials and decorations, although the decorations on each house are arranged differently. Each house is made of brick and is trimmed with terracotta and stone, capped by a mansard roof with a dormer. Decorations such as wreaths and swags; doors with paneling; and sunflowers and roses were used extensively, and all except one of the houses is 12 feet (3.7 m) wide.

== Description ==
146–156 East 89th Street are a group of six rowhouses located on the Upper East Side of Manhattan in New York City, New York, US. Designed by Hubert, Pirrson & Company in the Queen Anne style, they were constructed by developer William Rhinelander. Numbered in increasing order from west to east, the houses are all placed on the south side of the street and are flanked by apartment buildings.

The houses share materials and decorations, although the decorations on each house are arranged differently. Each house is made of brick and is trimmed with terracotta and stone, capped by a mansard roof with a dormer. Decorations such as wreaths and swags; doors with paneling; and sunflowers and roses were used extensively in the buildings. The buildings' decorations are similar to those of the Navarro Flats, a later-demolished apartment building along Central Park South that Hubert, Pirsson & Co. had also designed. Except the westernmost house at number 146 (the westernmost house), the houses are all 12 feet (3.7 m) wide, enough to fit a single bay. Number 146 measures 20 feet (6.1 m) wide, with a setback at its western end; because of this setback, it is the only house where more than one elevation of the facade is visible from the street. The rears of the buildings are visible only from a private alley, and the buildings have no side elevations because they are separated from each other only by shared party walls. The interiors have stair halls with skylighted ceilings, along with decorations such as tiled fireplaces, simple trim, and wooden floors.

=== House details ===
The recessed western bay of 146 East 89th Street has an entrance at ground level, a second-story window with terracotta plaques, along with a third-story double bay. The main facade to the east, the ground level has two multi-pane segmentally arched windows, each topped by lintels, which contain terracotta voussoirs flanking a keystone. There is a white spandrel panel separating the first- and second-floor windows, above which is a wrought-iron balcony on the second floor. The third floor of number 146 is asymmetrical and has a square niche, a terracotta plaque, and a protruding oriel with windows; the oriel extends to the fourth floor, where there are dormer windows with pediments.

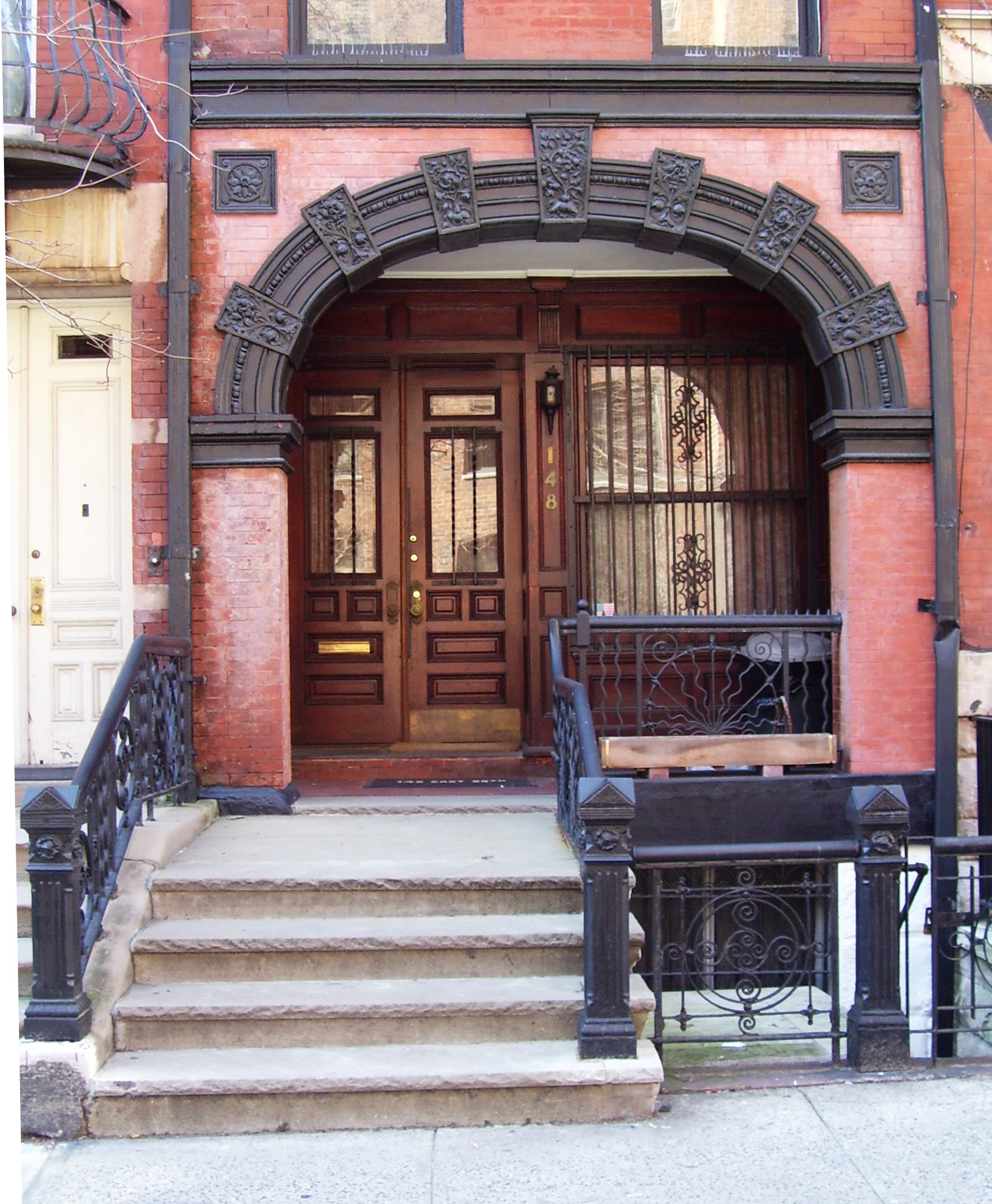
Detail of number 148's entrance

Number 148 and 154 (the second-westernmost and second-easternmost houses in the group) have similar designs to each other, with an arched first-story entrance, a pair of second-story windows, and a three-sided oriel window on the third story. The arch of number 148 is a three-centered arch with a bead and reel motif, while at number 154, a stoop ascends to a round arch with rough-textured voussoirs. Behind both houses' arches are double-door entrances. The first and second floors of both houses are separated by horizontal design details: a molded band course at number 148 and a smooth stone band at number 154. The second-floor windows at number 148 are three-centered arches with voussoirs, and those at number 154 are square-headed openings with flat arches. Both houses' second-floor windows have keystones, and there is a corbel above the second floors of both houses, supporting the oriel above. Both houses have cornices above their third stories, as well as dormer windows in their roofs.

Number 150 (the third-westernmost house in the group) has a stoop leading to a pair of double doors; there are a plaque and window to the left of the door. Above the door are a stone band, a wrought-iron balcony, and a second-floor tripartite window with a stone band at the same height as its imposts. The third-floor window of number 150 have elaborately carved mullions. Above the third story is a cornice and a dormer window.

Numbers 152 and 156 (the third easternmost and the easternmost houses, respectively) both have similar designs, each with protruding windows on their second floors and a single window on their third floors. Both number 152 and 156 are accessed by stoops, with square-headed windows and terracotta plaques to the left of their respective doors, and terracotta bands running just below the upper edge of the first-floor windows and doors. The lintels above the door and window of number 152 are connected. Number 156 has a single-leaf door—in contrast to all the other houses in the row, which have double doors—and a continuous lintel shared by the window and door. Numbers 152 and 156 have three-sided oriels on their second stories, with corbels and foliate motifs in number 152, and rope moldings and foliate motifs in number 156. The third-story windows of both buildings are flanked by plaques and topped by cornices and dormer windows of slightly different designs. The third-story window at number 152 is divided into three panes, while that at number 156 is divided into two panes.

== History ==
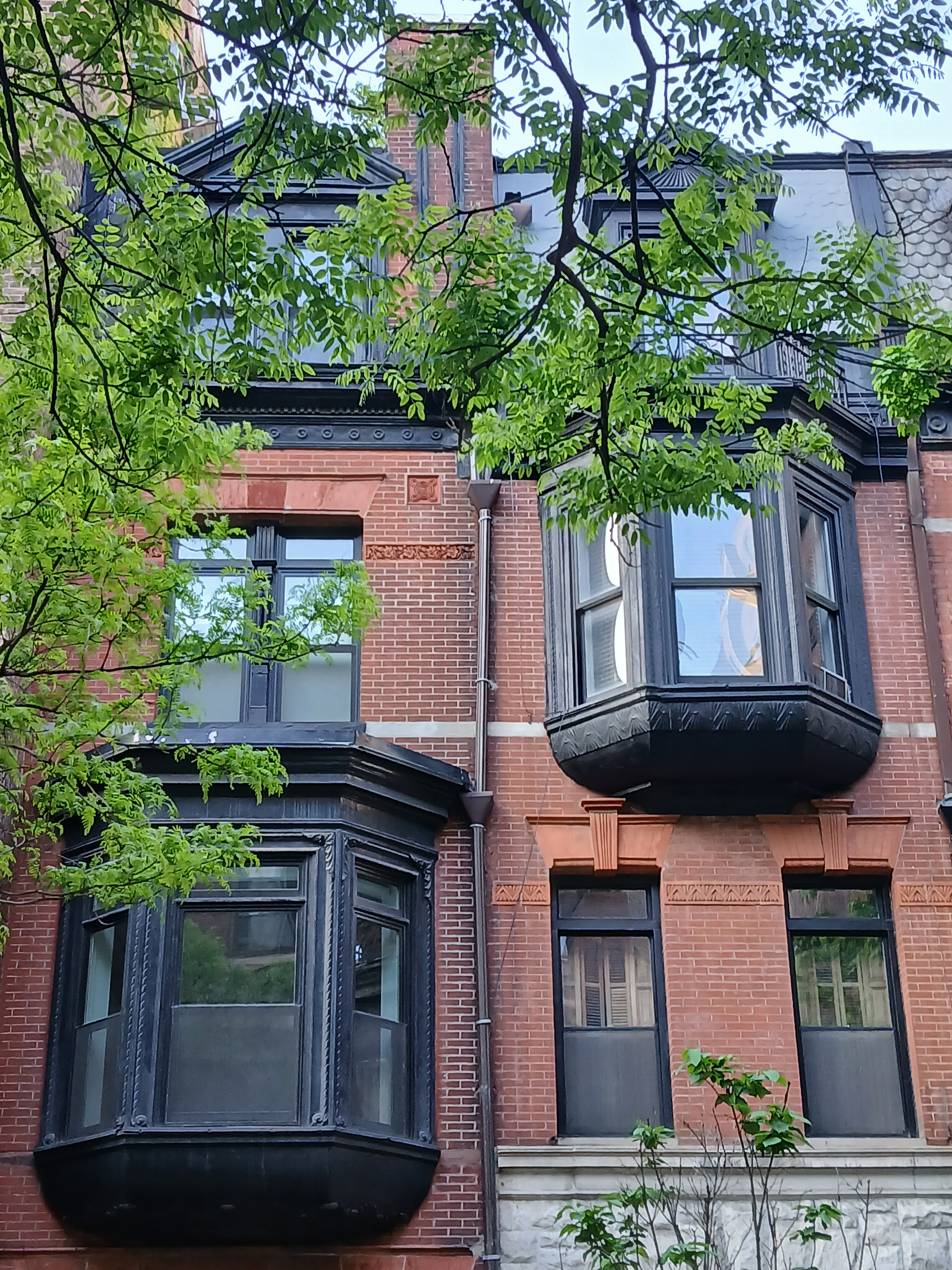
Some of the oriel windows

The site had been owned by the Rhinelander family since 1812. The houses at 146–156 East 89th Street were developed between 1886 and 1887. William Rhinelander developed the houses along with the Hardenbergh/Rhinelander Historic District structures, located immediately to the west on Lexington Avenue. The houses were originally part of a group of ten; the four additional houses were located to the west, facing Lexington Avenue. At the time, rowhouses were being developed for middle-class families in the surrounding portion of the Upper East Side.

146–156 East 89th Street were owned by the Rhinelander estate until 1945. when they were sold to Joseph L. Ennis & Co. The next year, all the houses were resold. Ennis sold number 150 to Curzon Dobell, number 156 to James Clifford De Long, number 152 to an unidentified client of Edward E. Singer, and number 146 to an unidentified client of William A. White & Sons. Number 148, which was sold to Julia Shubelka, was later resold to Dickran P. Donchian in 1959. The houses were listed by the New York City Landmarks Preservation Commission as individual city landmarks in 1979. The houses were all listed on the National Register of Historic Places as a joint listing in 1982.

== Reception ==
The AIA Guide to New York City called them "six spectacularly romantic Queen Anne remainders of a row of ten". A writer for the Real Estate Record and Guide said in 1890 that the buildings "show a number of fine panels and copings, as well as cornice work, imposts, springers and wood mouldings", along with second-story balustrades. The Record, praising the differing arrangement of the design details in each building, called them "a giant step forward toward the era of perfect houses".

== See also ==
- List of New York City Designated Landmarks in Manhattan from 59th to 110th Streets
- National Register of Historic Places listings in Manhattan from 59th to 110th Streets

== Sources ==
- National Register of Historic Places Inventory/Nomination: Houses at 146–156 East 89th Street (PDF) (Report). National Park Service. 1982. With accompanying pictures
