= James W. Pirrson =

American architect

James W. Pirsson
- Born: December 15, 1833; New York City, New York
- Died: 1888 (aged 54–55); New York City, New York
- Known for: Architect

James W. Pirsson (December 15, 1833 in New York City – 1888 in New York City) was an American architect and a founder of the New York City architectural firm Hubert & Pirsson, later Hubert, Pirsson, and Company (active from c.1870 to 1888) with Philip Gengembre Hubert, AIA, (1830–1911). The firm produced many of the city's Gilded Age buildings, including hotels, churches and residences.

His father “was a well-known piano-forte manufacturer and musician who helped to found the New York Philharmonic Society. Pirsson received his training from an English architect named Weeler and was engaged in a very active practice before joining with Hubert in 1870. In that year, the two men are listed as the architects for two third-class tenements erected on East 49th Street between First and Second Avenues under the first name Hubert & Pirsson. Their partnership lasted until Pirsson's death in 1888. Upon his death, the firm operated under the name Hubert, Pirson & Haddick, until 1893 when Hubert retired.

== See also ==
- Hubert, Pirrson & Co.
- Philip Gengembre Hubert
