= Remsen Brinckerhoff Ogilby =

American Episcopal priest and teacher (1881–1943)

Remsen Brinckerhoff Ogilby (1881–1943) was an Episcopal priest and teacher, and the president of Trinity College in Hartford, Connecticut from 1920 to his death in 1943.

He was born April 8, 1881, in New Brunswick, New Jersey. He graduated from Harvard in 1902.

As president, he was involved in Trinity's expansion, and in the construction of the Trinity College Chapel.

Ogilby organized a meeting of carillonneurs in 1934 that eventually would culminate in the founding of The Guild of Carillonneurs in North America.

He married Lois M. Cunningham in 1919.

He died in Weekapaug, Rhode Island, while trying to save his servant from drowning.
