= St. Thomas More Church (New York City) =

Catholic church in Manhattan, New York

Coordinates: 40°46′57.89″N 73°57′24.1″W

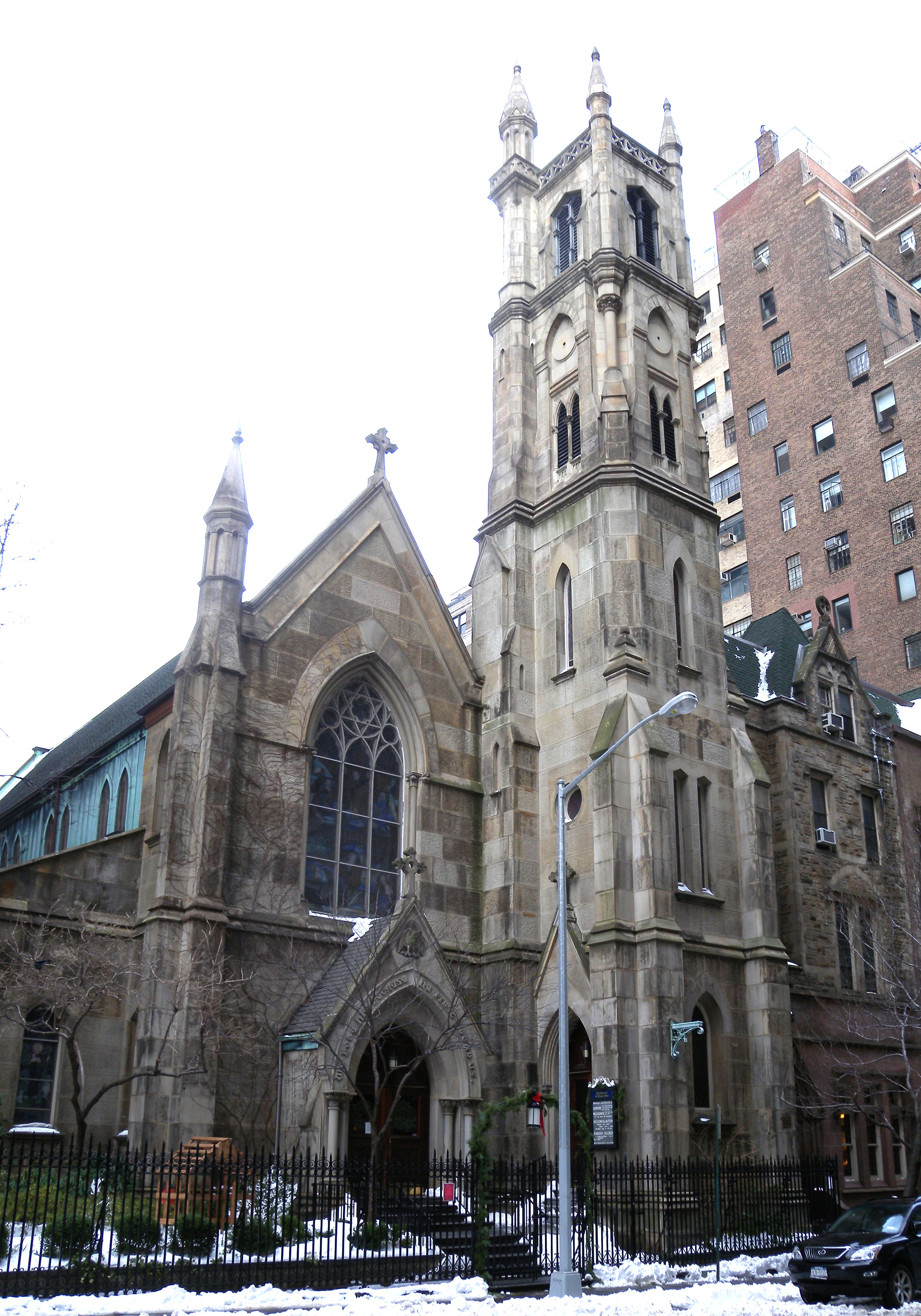
- Interactive map of the St. Thomas More Church area
- Former names: Episcopal Chapel of the Beloved Disciple

General information
- Architectural style: Gothic Revival architecture
- Location: 65 East 89th Street; New York, New York, U.S.
- Completed: 1870
- Client: Roman Catholic Archdiocese of New York

Technical details
- Structural system: Sandstone masonry

Design and construction
- Architect: Hubert & Pirsson

Website
- The Roman Catholic Church of St. Thomas More, Manhattan

St. Thomas More Church is part of a Catholic church complex located at 65 East 89th Street on the Upper East Side in Manhattan, New York City. The parish is under the authority of the Archdiocese of New York. Attached to the complex is the church (1870), a single-cell chapel (1879), a rectory (1880), and a parish house (1893).

The church was built for the Episcopal Church as the Chapel of the Beloved Disciple in the Gothic Revival architectural style. Under various names, the church has since been used by three Christian denominations, including the Dutch Reformed Church and the Catholic Church. It is the second-oldest church on the Upper East Side.

== History ==
The church was built in 1870 for the Episcopal Church as the Chapel of the Beloved Disciple, constructed in the Gothic Revival architectural style with sandstone from Nova Scotia. The designed were made by the architectural firm of Hubert & Pirsson. It is the second-oldest church on the Upper East Side. Architectural historian and New York Times journalist Christopher Gray wrote of the church:

"The Gothic-style building has the air of a picturesque English country church, with a plot of green in front and a square tower rising in front of the sanctuary. According to Andrew S. Dolkart, an architectural historian specializing in church design, the building is closely modeled after Edward Buckton Lamb's Church of St. Martin's, Gospel Oak, London (see Gospel Oak), built in 1865. 'It has almost every little quirky detail of the London church,' says Mr. Dolkart. 'The chamfered corners, the varying planes of the façade, the asymmetrical pinnacle at the top of the tower. It really captures your attention.'"

Attached to the complex are a single-cell chapel (1879), and a rectory and a parish house (1880 and 1893). The larger Episcopal Church of the Heavenly Rest, on Fifth Avenue and 45th Street, relocated to 2 East 90th Street, forcing Beloved Disciple to merge with it (its name retained in a chapel). The old church was sold in 1929 to wealthy Dutch Reformed congregants from Harlem who formed the Second Collegiate Church of Harlem.

In 1950, the Reformed congregation sold the building to the Catholic Church, who rededicated it to St. Thomas More. The church was renovated in the later half of the 20th century by architect Paul C. Reilly.

== Notable parishioners ==
- Jacqueline Kennedy Onassis was a parishioner there until her death, and she had a Mass offered for John F. Kennedy every November 22 on the anniversary of his death, a tradition later maintained by her daughter Caroline. Her 1994 funeral was held at the nearby St. Ignatius of Loyola because of the number of attendees.
- On July 23, 1999, after the death of John F. Kennedy Jr. in a plane crash, the Kennedy family held a private memorial service for him at St. Thomas More, at which Senator Ted Kennedy gave the eulogy and President Bill Clinton attended.
- Jack Schlossberg, writer and John F. Kennedy’s only grandson had his first communion at the church in 2001
- Peggy Noonan
- Fashion and street photographer Bill Cunningham was also a regular parishioner and a private Requiem Mass was celebrated for the repose of his soul by Fr Kevin Madigan on June 30, 2016.
- The private funeral for Lee Bouvier Radziwill was held at the church on 25 February 2019.
