= Concord Free Public Library =

Public library in Concord, Massachusetts

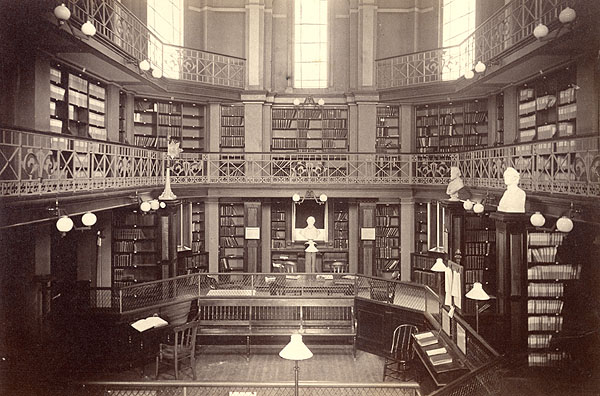
- Interior of the library, 1873
- Interactive map of the Concord Free Public Library area

General information
- Architectural style: Georgian
- Location: Concord, Massachusetts, 129 Main St., Concord, Mass. 01742
- Coordinates: 42.458°N 71.353°W
- Completed: 1873
- Renovated: 1889, 1917, Early 1930s, 1938, 1968, 1986 to 1990, 2003 to 2005

Technical details
- Floor count: 3

Design and construction
- Architecture firm: Snell & Gregerson

The Concord Free Public Library is a public library in the town of Concord, Massachusetts. The main building is located at 129 Main Street, and the Fowler branch is located at 1322 Main Street in West Concord.

== History ==
The Concord Free Public Library was founded by Concord native William Munroe, son of the famed pencil-maker. Munroe worked with other prominent members of Concord to form a board of trustees that would provide financial backing for the library. Building plans were commissioned by Boston firm Snell & Gregerson. The land was purchased in 1869, and construction began in 1872. The library was dedicated on October 1, 1873.

In March 1885, the Concord Free Library was the first institution to ban Mark Twain's The Adventures of Huckleberry Finn, and a number of New England newspapers applauded their condemnation: the Daily Advertiser (Boston), the Daily Republican (Springfield, MA), and the Freeman (Concord, MA). But many criticized or mocked the library's decision, and as a number of contemporaries and Twain himself noted, the ban contributed to the novel's publicity and helped its sales.

The Fowler branch of the Concord Free Public Library, designed by architect Harry Little, was dedicated on May 18, 1930.
