= Leander Zimmerman =

American Lutheran pastor (1860–1952)

The Reverend Leander M. Zimmerman
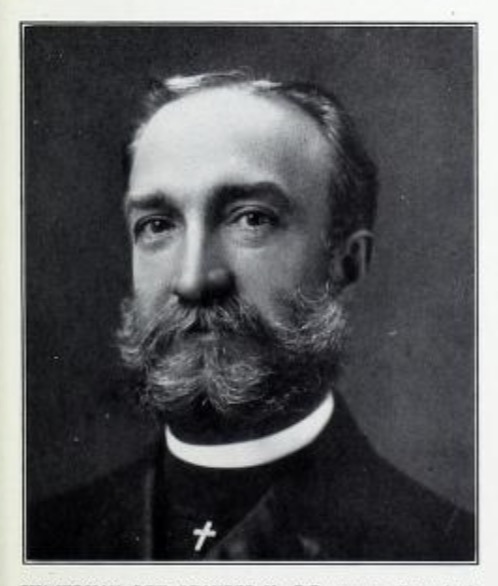
- Leander Zimmerman c. 1914
- Born: August 29, 1860 near Manchester, Maryland
- Died: March 10, 1952 (aged 91); Washington, D.C.
- Education: Lutheran Theological Seminary at Gettysburg
- Occupation: Pastor
- Years active: 1887-1925

Leander M. Zimmerman (1860–1952) was an American Lutheran minister. He was the founding pastor of Christ English Lutheran Church in Baltimore. He was an author, a poet, and a prominent civic figure.

== Early life and education ==
Leander Zimmerman was born on August 29, 1860 on a farm near Manchester in Carroll County, Maryland. He was the son of Henry and Leah Gladfelter Zimmerman. He attended Pennsylvania College at Gettysburg, graduating in 1884, followed by the Lutheran Theological Seminary at Gettysburg.

== Career ==
Zimmerman organized the St. Matthew's English Lutheran Church in Oswego, New York, in 1886, as part of a pastoral internship. He was supervised by his brother, Jeremiah, who was also a pastor.

Zimmerman was ordained on October 8, 1887, in Williamsport, Maryland. That fall, he was offered a posting to the First English Lutheran Church of Richmond, Virginia, but declined.

Two months after his ordination, the General Synod of the Lutheran Church sent Zimmerman to Baltimore city to help struggling parishes and advise on suitable sites for new congregations. On arriving in Baltimore, he immediately began canvassing the South Baltimore neighborhood door-to-door, encouraging individuals and families to join a new church. Zimmerman also promised the church would forego pew rents and rely on free-will offerings. The new Christ English Evangelical Lutheran Church—a name meant to distinguish it from existing German-language congregations–began on December 18, 1887 with about 150 people rising to 360 after four months. In his first year in Baltimore, Zimmerman made more than 4,000 home visits. His efforts meant that the new congregation quickly outgrew its rented premises. The congregation purchased the site of another church on Hill Street for $8,000, and dedicated the new building on November 25, 1888. At the same time, the congregation elected to make the church self-sustaining, no longer requiring financial support. Zimmerman was formally installed as pastor on December 2, 1888.

Zimmerman ran the church with a small staff and declined salary increases and posh accommodation. However, he was "far ahead of his time in the use of promotional methods": he distributed buttons, postcards, and promotional tracts bearing his own image, and published sermons, tracts, poems, and novels.

Much of Zimmerman's preaching and writing focused on how to help people establish stability and build resilience in their personal lives. He saw social ills as more the result of institutional than individual failings. While Zimmerman did not believe women should preach, he thought they should be allowed to earn a living and vote. He also admonished husbands to "keep up a continual courtship" and criticized sexual double standards. He was also sympathetic to labor, decrying the "sweating system" that capital imposed on workers and to those trapped in poverty, arguing that, while poverty was no excuse for wrongdoing, it was often a cause of it.

Zimmerman served on the Home Missions Board of the General Synod. He was also one of the founding members of the Lutheran Deaconess Motherhouse. He also served on the Board of Trustees of the Gettysburg Seminary and was elected President of the Maryland Synod in 1900.

At one point, Zimmerman contemplated retirement in a sermon but the congregation begged him to stay. Later, he submitted a letter of resignation but the church council refused it, instead offering him periodic vacations. By this time, the congregation numbered almost 2,000—the largest in Baltimore.

Zimmerman labored another seven years before retiring on April 19, 1925, at age 65 and in poor health. Nearly 1,800 people crowded the auditorium, galleries, and Sunday school rooms to hear his final sermon.

In 1947, on the church's 60th anniversary, 1,100 people feted Zimmerman at the Lord Baltimore Hotel. Letters paying tribute to Zimmerman poured in from across the country, including from President Harry S. Truman, Senator and former Governor of Maryland Herbert O'Conor, Senator Millard Tydings, Maryland Governor William Preston Lane, Jr., the future Maryland Governor Theodore R. McKeldin, Baltimore Mayor Thomas D'Alesandro, Jr.

Zimmerman received an inheritance from an older brother, a $5,000 gift from a Baltimore woman who was not even a member of the congregation, and a $25,000 pension from the church, which also honored him with the title "Pastor Emeritus." He remained active particularly on Christmas, Easter, and Thanksgiving. He preached 62 consecutive Thanksgiving services; the last in 1949. The following year he slipped and fractured his pelvis, prompting a move to the National Lutheran Home for the Aged in Washington, D.C. He returned to Christ Lutheran Church one final time on Easter Sunday, 1950, to deliver his last sermon.

== Awards and Honors ==
Zimmerman received an honorary Doctor of Divinity (D.D.) degree from Susquehanna University in 1901. Gettysburg Seminary also awarded him an honorary Doctor of Laws (LL.D) degree in 1939.

His alma mater, Gettysburg College, awards a prize in his honour to a graduating senior.

== Death ==
Zimmerman died on March 10, 1952, in Washington, D.C. His body was taken back to Baltimore, to Christ Lutheran Church, where his body lay in state and was viewed by more than 4,000 people.

More than 1,000 attended his funeral, including the Governor of Maryland Theodore McKeldin.

== Works ==
Zimmerman was the author of multiple books, numerous poems, tracts, and commemorative writings.

=== Books ===
- Sunshine: A Book to Help Bring Sunshine into Our Daily Life (1896)
- Paths That Cross (1897)
- A Wedding Token (1898)
- Expository Thoughts on Pilgrim's Progress: A Book Helpful for Christian Living (1899)
- Yvonne (1899)
- Dot: A Novel of To-Day (1909)
- Sparks: A Series of Popular Reflections on Ethical and Social Topics (1912)
- Cordelia (1914)
- Reminiscences after Thirty Years in the Ministry (1917)
- Echoes From a Distant Battlefield (1920)
- For Love's Sake (1922)
- The Church of Our Faith (1923)
- The Gospel Minister (1930)
- The Shepherding of Souls (1932)
- The Mellow Fruits of Experience (1936)
- Prayers: For All People, For All Occasions (1939)
- The Preacher's Doorknob (1942)
- Pearls of Comfort from Tennyson's "In Memoriam"

=== Poetry ===
- Finding His Own Lamb (1902)
- Love Enchains All (1913)
- My Philosophy of History (1929)
- Leaves for Healing (1931)
- What are the Flowers Saying? (1931)
- Hospital Meditation (1932)
- Life Abundant (1933)
- In the Bright Beyond (1933)
- Write a Story (1940)
- Helps (1942)
- Abiding Values (1947)
- Lighted Candles (1949)
- Help Make Roses Bloom Again (1950)
- Thoughts
- Love and Sunshine
- In Hours of Sorrow
- Roses Will Bloom Again
- The Gain is Yours
- Wanted - A Superiority Complex
- The Loss Is Yours
- God's Rainbow
- I Now Understand
- Making Friends
- Thoughts for Happiness
- Better Days Are Coming
- A Bow Unfading`
- A Healing Voice

=== Tracts ===
- Gospel Blessing (1903)
- Christmas Thoughts (1907)
- Big Brother (1912)
- Does God Care for Me? (1917)
- The Lenten Revival Season (1920)
- Good Citizenship (1921)
- A Ray of Sunshine for the Gloomy Heart (1922)
- Good Cheer (1922)
- Digging Wells (1923)
- The Spirit of Goodwill (1924)
- Seems Like a New World (1924)
- Where is Heaven? (1934)
- When Days Are Dark (1934)
- A Day Spent with God
- Forgive, Forget
- Love for the Unloved
- Arrows Shot at a Venture
- Little Foxes
- Heart Hunger
- How Many Live, How All Should Live, How All Will Wish They Had Lived

=== Commemorative Writings ===
- Twentieth Anniversary of Christ Lutheran Church (1887-1907)
- "Kindest Greetings" - Thirtieth Anniversary, Christ English Lutheran Church (1887-1917)
- "Looking Backward Over Forty Years" - Christ Lutheran Church, Fortieth Anniversary (1887-1927)
