= Philip Gengembre Hubert =

American architect

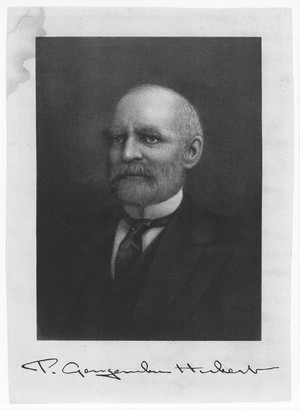
- Philip Hubert – circa 1885
- Born: August 20, 1830; Paris, France
- Died: November 15, 1911 (aged 81); California, U.S.
- Other name: Philip Gengembre
- Known for: Architect
- Children: Philip Gengembre Hubert, Jr.

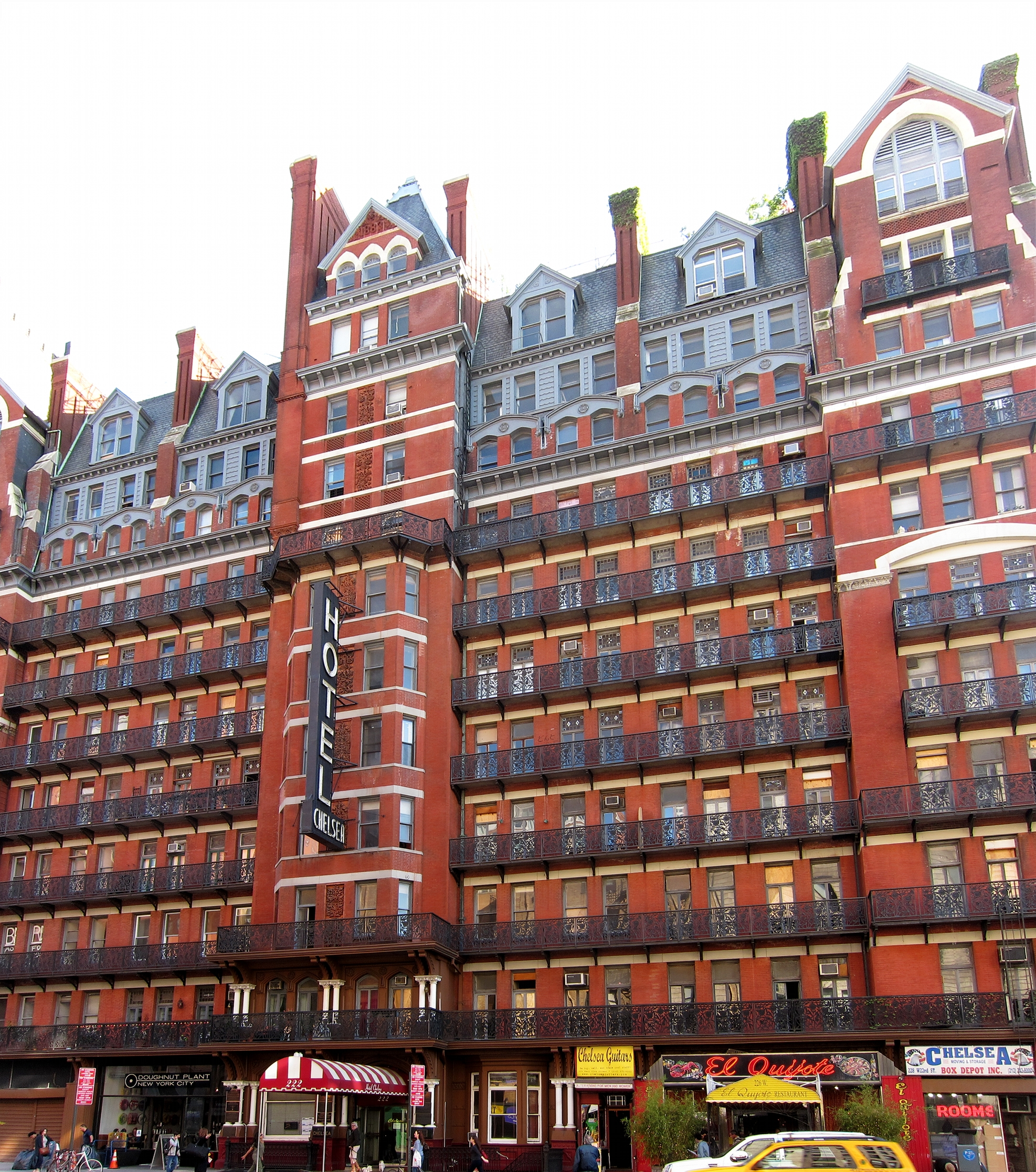
The Hotel Chelsea, New York City

Philip Gengembre Hubert, Sr., AIA, (August 20, 1830 – November 15, 1911) was a French-American architect and founder of the New York City architectural firm Hubert & Pirsson (later Hubert, Pirsson, and Company, active from c. 1870 to 1888, and Hubert, Pirsson, and Haddick, active from 1888 to 1898) with James W. Pirsson (1833–1888). The firm produced many of the city's "Gilded Age" finest buildings, including hotels, churches and residences.

== Life ==
Hubert was born in Paris to Colomb Gengembre, an architect and engineer who taught him architecture. (Note: His father was born in 1790 and began working as an architect at age 19. He worked primarily in municipal commissions, like Mint of the City of Cassel which he designed and built when he was 19. He was injured during the Revolution of 1830 on the same day that his son Philip was born. The family then went to London and Gengembre worked as an architect for Charles Fourier. He returned to France and continued his work as an architect, designing communal schools in each district in France and wrote an architectural style book. The family left for the United States during the French Revolution of 1848. After living in Cincinnati, Gengembre settled in Manchester, Pennsylvania and designed pro bono the Allegheny City Hall by 1863. Gengembre stopped speaking English in protest after he was offered a share of the graft of over-inflated construction costs.) His sister was artist Sophie Gengembre Anderson. Hubert emigrated with his parents in 1849 to the United States, first settling in Cincinnati, Ohio. In Cincinnati, he taught French by writing his textbooks, "which were published and widely used in schools of that time." In 1853, he took up a position at Girard College in Philadelphia as the first professor of French and history; he moved to Boston and was offered a professorship at Harvard, which he did not accept. He moved to New York in 1865 and studied architecture. "As a young man, he contributed a large number of short and serial stories to magazines—of a versatile turn of mind he took a vivid interest in many things and conversed with keen intelligence and originality upon politics, social science, invention and literature…."

He moved to New York in 1865 at the end of the American Civil War. He became associated with Pirsson to design six single-family residences on the southwest corner of Lexington Avenue and East 43rd Street. Upon Pirsson's death, the firm operated under the name Hubert, Pirsson & Haddick until 1893 when Hubert retired to California. In retirement, he "took several patents upon devices for making housekeeping easy, among which he improved oil and gas furnaces, a fireless cooker, and, during the last six months of his life, he was busy with a device for supplying hot water more quickly and more cheaply…."

== Noted works ==
His most notable works while at Hubert & Pirsson included:

- The $5 million 12-story Central Park or Navarro Buildings (1882) on Seventh Avenue at 58th and 59th Streets
- The Hawthorne, ten-story co-op
- The Rembrandt, ten-story co-op
- The Milano, a seven-story co-op
- The Chelsea (1883), twelve-story residential hotel
- The Mount Morris, a nine-story co-op
- No. 80 Madison Avenue, nine-story co-op
- No. 125 Madison Avenue, twelve-story co-op
- The Sevilla (Hotel), 58th Street
- The Old Lyceum Theatre at Fourth Avenue and 23rd Street
- The old Shoreham Hotel, Washington, DC

== See also ==
- Philip H. Frohman, grandson and architect
- Hubert, Pirsson & Co.
- James W. Pirsson
