= Hubert, Pirrson & Company =

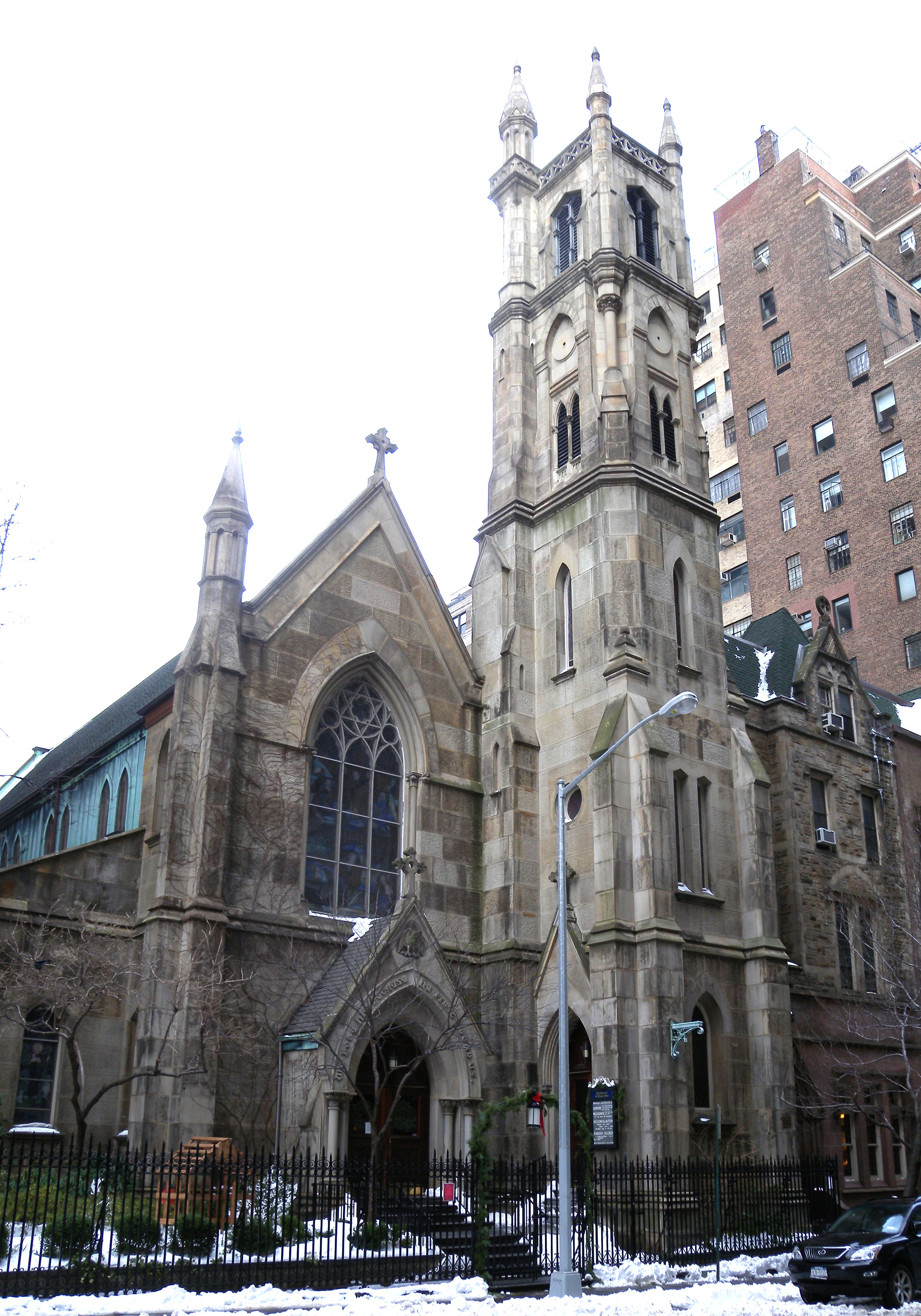
Episcopal Church of the Blessed Disciple, 1870 (St. Thomas More Catholic Church since 1950)

Hubert, Pirrson & Company was a New York City architectural firm, founded by Philip Gengembre Hubert (1830–1911) and James W. Pirrson (1833–1888), which was active from c.1870 to 1888. It was later known as Hubert, Pirrson & Haddick from 1888-1898. Active during New York City's "Gilded Age", the firm produced many of the city’s finest buildings, including hotels, churches and residences, and were especially noted for their luxury co-operative apartments and residential hotels.

== History and style ==
The French-born Hubert and the New York City-native Pirrson, who was trained by an English architect, established their partnership around 1870; the former’s father was the architect and engineer Charles Antoine Colomb Gengembre, while the latter’s father was a well-connected "piano-forte manufacturer and musician who helped to found the New York Philharmonic Society."

In 1870, both men were "listed as the architects for two third-class tenements erected on East 49th Street between First and Second Avenues under the first name Hubert & Pirrson." Their partnership lasted until Pirrson’s death in 1888.

The firm initially designed typical single-family rowhouses and tenements. However, the firm is credited with the Episcopal Church of the Blessed Disciple in 1870. Still listed as Hubert & Pirrson, the firm submitted designs for The Appleby in October 1879, a French flathouse on the southeast corner of West 58th Street and Seventh Avenue. The Landmarks Preservation Commission of New York City explained that "It was the firm’s designs for this type of building which gained for them fame and prestige." Some of their most famous apartment houses are the Central Park Apartments or Spanish Flats (now demolished) which had stood on the southeast corner of Seventh Avenue and Central Park South, and the Chelsea (1883) on West 23d Street, a designated New York City Landmark. The firm incorporated some innovative concepts into their apartment plans such as the "mezzanine plan" or split level apartment, and they provided a greater degree of light and air for their apartments than did most of their contemporaries. Hubert & Pirrson were also actively involved in encouraging the growth of cooperative ownership of apartments.

"The Queen Anne style, which characterizes this row, is an American variant of the interpretation of early 18th-century English brick architecture Specific details associated with this style include Tudor roses, sunflowers, multi-paneled wood doors and various classical motifs such as swags and wreaths, which often appear on the sheet-metal roof cornices. The characteristic details of the style were frequently combined with other architectural styles."

Upon Pirrson’s death, the firm operated under the name Hubert, Pirsson & Haddick until 1893 when Hubert retired to California.

== Works of Hubert & Pirrson (1870-1888) ==
- the former Episcopal Church of the Blessed Disciple (1870)
- Hotel Chelsea, NYC, 1884
- 146–156 East 89th Street (1886–87), six survive of an original ten attached townhouses, NYC landmark , NRHP
- Croisic Hotel (demolished), 220 Fifth Avenue

=== Attributed to Philip Hubert ===
His most important work was considered the $5 million 12-story Central Park or Navarro Buildings (1882) on Seventh Avenue at Fifty-eighth and Fifty-ninth Streets.

- The Hawthorne, ten-stories, co-op
- The Rembrandt, ten-stories, co-op
- The Milano, seven-stories, co-op
- The Chelsea Apartments (1883), twelve-stories, co-op, now the Hotel Chelsea , NYC landmark, NRHP
- The Mount Morris, nine-stories, co-op
- No. 80 Madison Avenue, nine-stories, co-op
- No. 125 Madison Avenue, twelve-stories, co-op
- The Sevilla (Hotel), Fifty-eighth Street
- The Old Lyceum Theatre at Fourth Avenue and Twenty-third Street
- The Shoreman Hotel, Washington, DC

== See also ==
- James W. Pirrson
- Philip Gengembre Hubert
