= Trinity College Chapel, Hartford =

Coordinates: 41.7492°N 72.6918°W

Trinity College Chapel
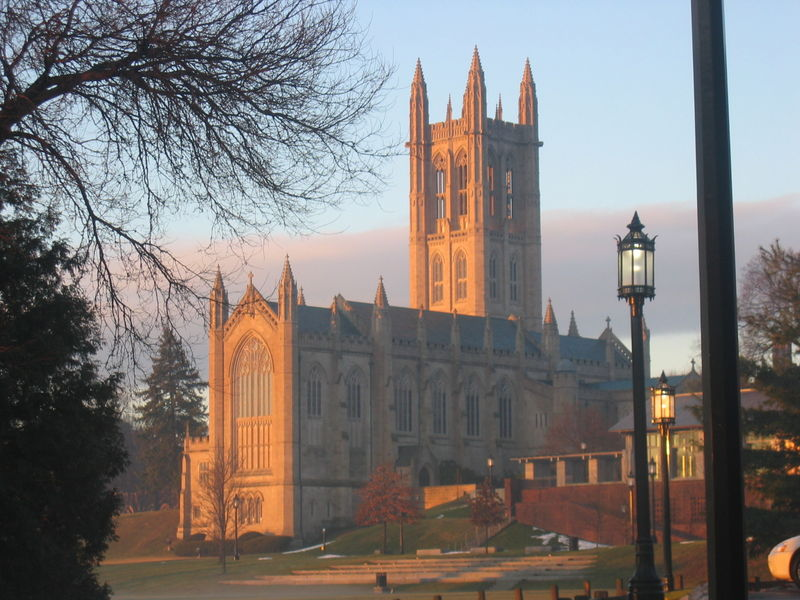
- Trinity College Chapel
- Location: Trinity College, Hartford, Connecticut
- Country: United States
- Denomination: Episcopal; Nondenominational

History
- Consecrated: June 18, 1931

Architecture
- Architect: Philip H. Frohman
- Architectural type: Gothic
- Years built: 1930 to 1932
- Groundbreaking: January 1, 1930; 96 years ago
- Construction cost: $500,000 (equivalent to $7,447,000 in 2025)

Specifications
- Capacity: 600
- Height: 65 feet (20 m)
- Materials: Indiana limestone

The Trinity College Chapel is a Gothic Revival church completed in 1932 on the campus of Trinity College in Hartford, Connecticut. It was designed by Philip H. Frohman of the firm Frohman, Robb and Little, who also designed the National Cathedral in Washington, D.C.

== History ==
The chapel was donated by Cleveland industrialist William Gwinn Mather, who graduated from Trinity College in 1877. The $500,000 gift (equivalent to $7,447,000 in 2025) was announced at the winter meeting of the college's board of trustees on December 2, 1927.

Architect Philip H. Frohman of the firm Frohman Robb and Little was hired in the summer of 1928 to design the structure.

Ground was broken on February 1, 1930. Shortly before, college administrators discovered a crate of stones donated to Trinity College in the early 1880s by an alumnus. It was decided that these stones would be worked into the fabric of the new chapel. The pieces of stone included:

- Framework and mullions of a window from the Palace of Whitehall, London;
- A corbel from Trinity College at the University of Cambridge;
- A piece of Roman tile from the Chapel of St. Pancras and a piece of Caen stone, both from St. Ethelbert's Tower at the Abbey Church of St. Peter, St. Paul, and St. Augustine at the Missionary College of St. Augustine in Canterbury, England;
- A piece of carved stone from Canterbury Cathedral in Canterbury, England;
- A stone from the churchyard wall at Sulgrave Manor, Northamptonshire, England;
- Part of a pillar from the old chapel at Trinity College Dublin in Ireland;
- Stone for the window in the storeroom from the residence of Cardinal Thomas Wolsey at Magdalen College at the University of Oxford.

The chapel's main altar was a gift from Katherine L. Mather, sister of Willam G. Mather, and carved from a cream-colored Texas limestone. A tiny fragment of worked stone, taken from the Temple Mount in Israel in 1855, was placed in the carved foundation stone at the front of the altar when it was laid on April 14, 1932.

The main contractor which erected the chapel was the R.G. Bent Co. of Hartford. Ironwork was provided by the Bradley & Hubbard Co. of Meriden, Connecticut, and the specialty wrought iron by The Iron Craftsmen of Philadelphia, Pennsylvania. Earl Edward Sanborn, who provided stained glass for Washington National Cathedral and the Boston College Library, designed and manufactured the initial stained glasswork.

The chapel was consecrated on June 19, 1932. Mather insisted that the chapel be left purposefully incomplete at the time of its consecreation. This would allow others to donate furnishings, stained glass, stone and wood carving, and other decorative elements.

== As constructed ==
The exterior is Gothic Revival in style, intended to reflect the English Gothic practice of the 13th century. The structure is completely masonry construction, set on bedrock, with foundation walls 6 feet (1.8 m) thick. The exterior is of Indiana limestone, and the roof of slate. The lintels over the doorways leading into the chapel are carved with images of the workmen who built the structure.

The crypt is Normanesque Revival in style. Seven layers of brick support the crypt ceiling. The crypt contains a Normanesque small chapel as well.

The interior of the chapel is clad in limestone covered with plaster, with the floor of flagstone. The roof is supported by specially carved wooden trusses; no concrete or steel beams were used. The ceiling is 65 feet (20 m) above the floor of the nave. As seen from the outside, the arches, transoms, mullions, and frames of the windows are in the Gothic Revival Style, but from the interior they are carved to look Normanesque. As one exits the chapel, one can see the lintels over the doorways are carved to depict monks studying Holy Scripture.

The large stained glass window in the east was a gift of William G. Mather. The rose window in the west was, at the time of consecration, made of clear leaded glass. Only four other stained glass windows were made for the chapel. One was donated by the workmen who constructed the church; one was given by alumnus and architect Henry W. Wright; and one window was donated by the Class of 1930 and another by the Class of 1892.

North of the nave is the Friendship Chapel. There are four stained glass windows here:

- The "Last Supper Window" was donated by Mary C. Henney
- The "Aeneas and Achates Window" was donated by college president Remsen Brinckerhoff Ogilby
- The "Damon and Pythias Window" was donated by Frank Langdon Wilcox
- The "David and Jonathan Window" was donated by the Alpha Chi Rho fraternity.

The Trinity College Chapel tower is 165 feet (50 m) tall. The carillon, donated by Rev. John Fields Plum, consists of 30 bells manufactured by John Taylor and Company of England.

A cloister is attached to the chapel, and in its walls are embedded a stones from the Great Wall of China, Mount Sinai, and a dungeon in which Joan of Arc was imprisoned.

== Post-construction additions ==
In 2016, St. John the Evangelist Church in Boston donated 24-foot (7.3 m) tall altar reredos by Ralph Adams Cram; a Lady Chapel altar and reredos by Cram; a set of screens by Cram; a screen with four sculptures by Henry Vaughan; and a 14-foot-tall great rood hanging crucifix by Vaughan to Trinity Chapel. The tall Cram altar reredos were installed behind the high altar, the Lady Chapel altar and reredos in the Friendship Chapel, and the screens at the west end of the choir.

Trinity College President Emerita Joanne Berger-Sweeney and her family gifted a large stained glass window in 2025 which was installed on the southern side of the high altar. The theme of the window is "the Holy Church throughout the world", and the central figure is Barbara Harris, the first woman to be consecrated a bishop in the Anglican Church. The Gothic Revival window was designed by Trinity College Chapel curator Christopher Row and glazier Greg Gorman.

== Organ ==
The organ, Skinner opus 851, is an 8,000 pipe, French-style Aeolian-Skinner built by G. Donald Harrison. It was the first time Harrison had complete control over an organ from the factory stage to the finishing installation.

The organ was donated by Dr. Dwight Wallace Tracy.

== Gallery ==
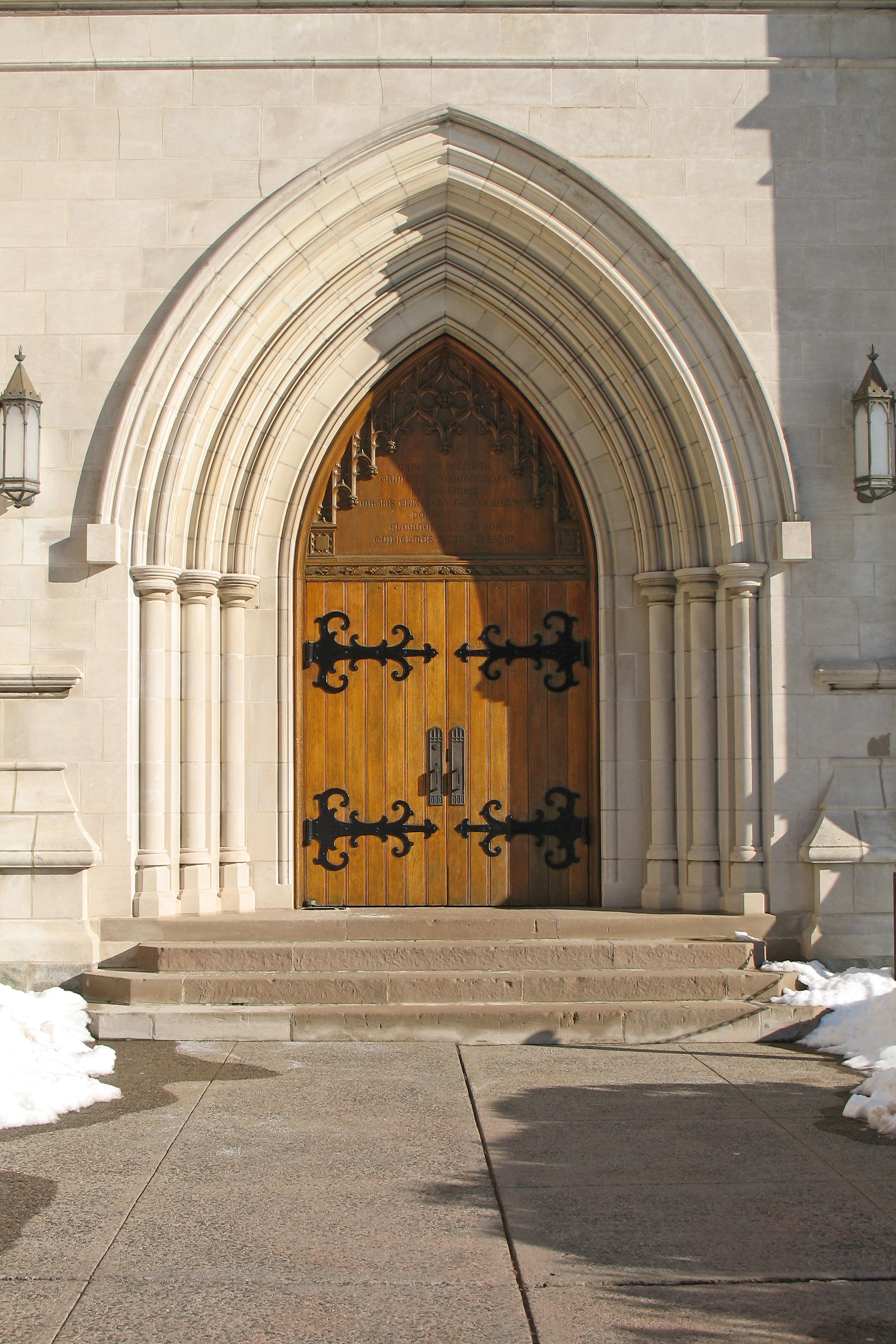
Trinity College Chapel

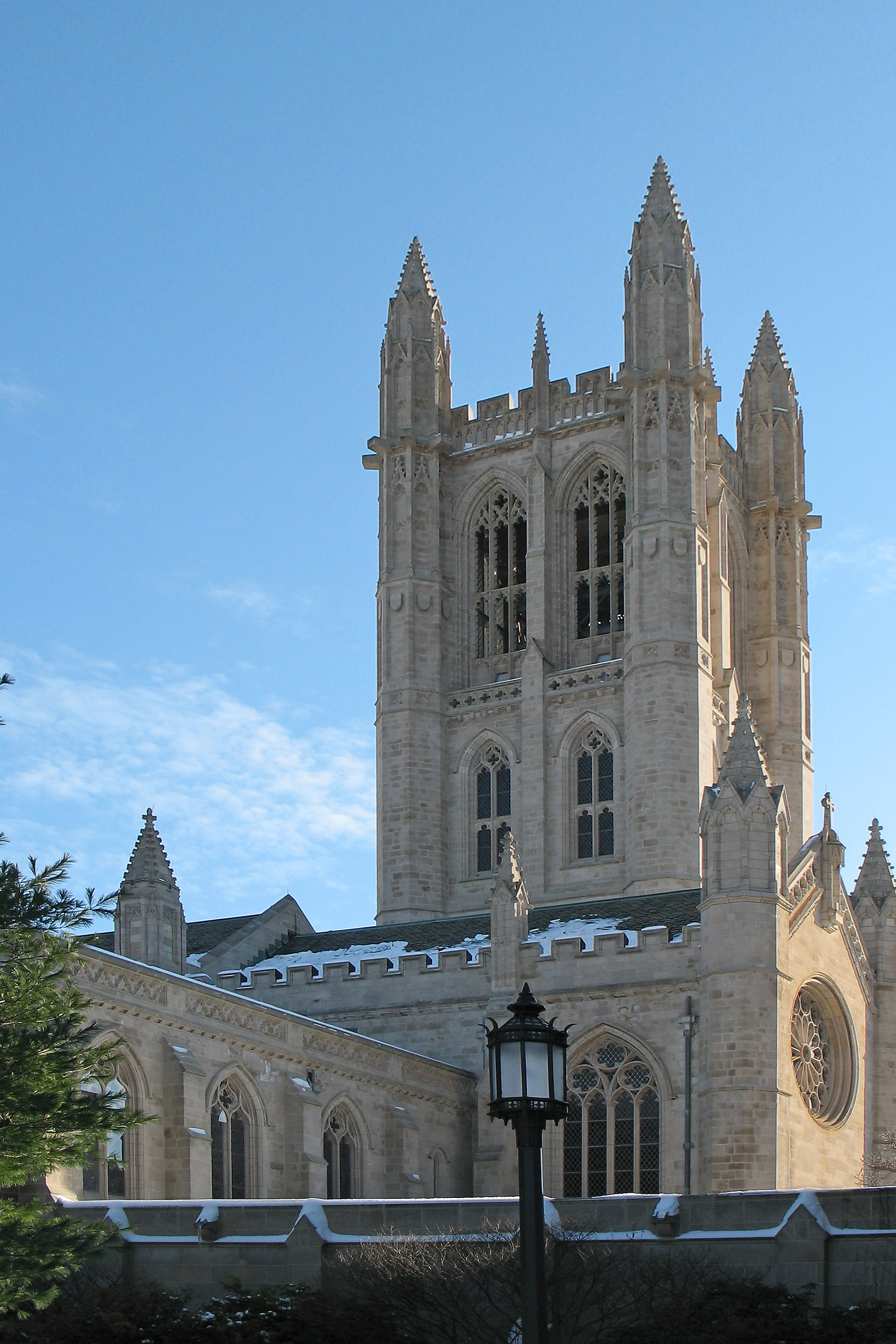
Trinity College Chapel

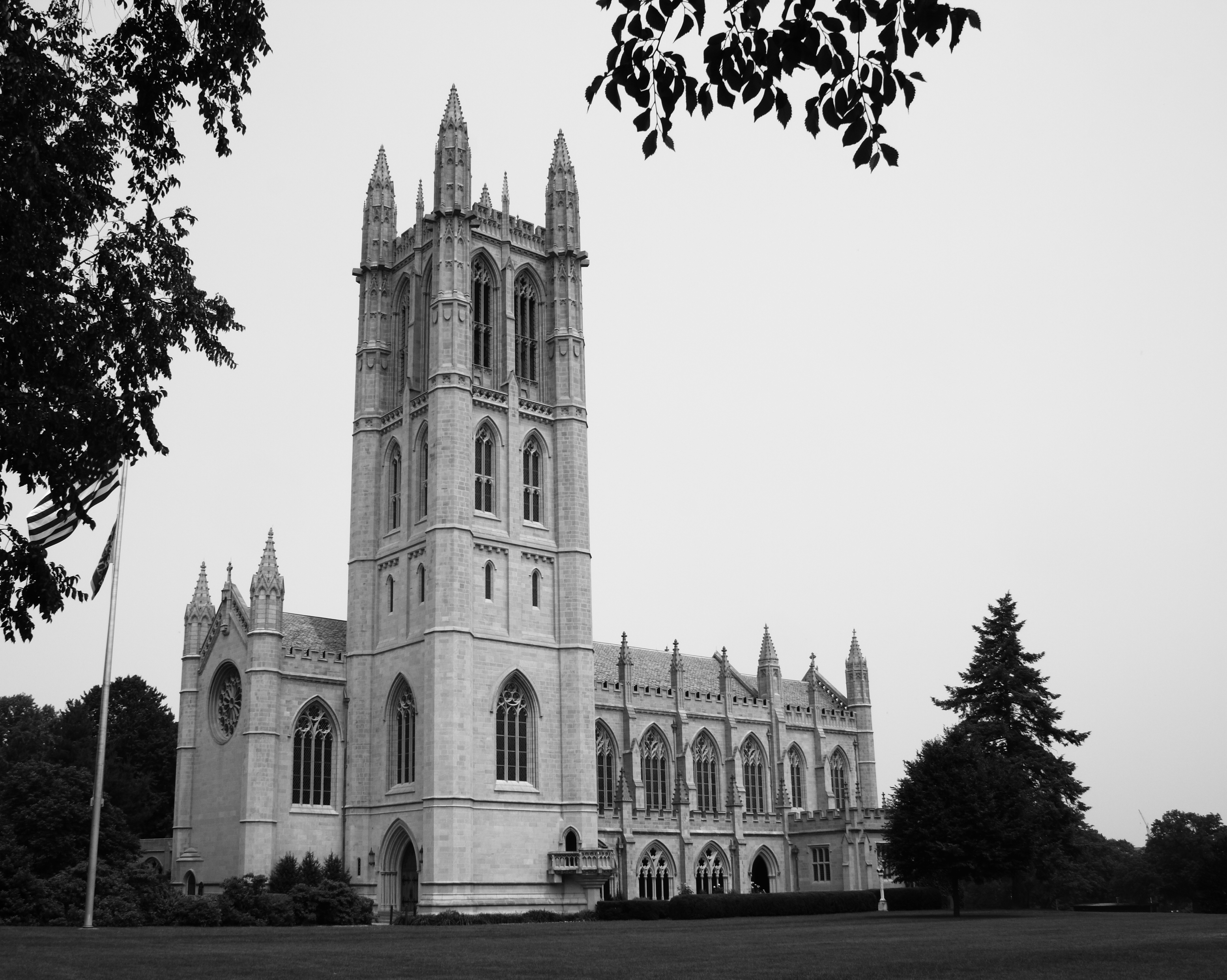
Trinity College Chapel

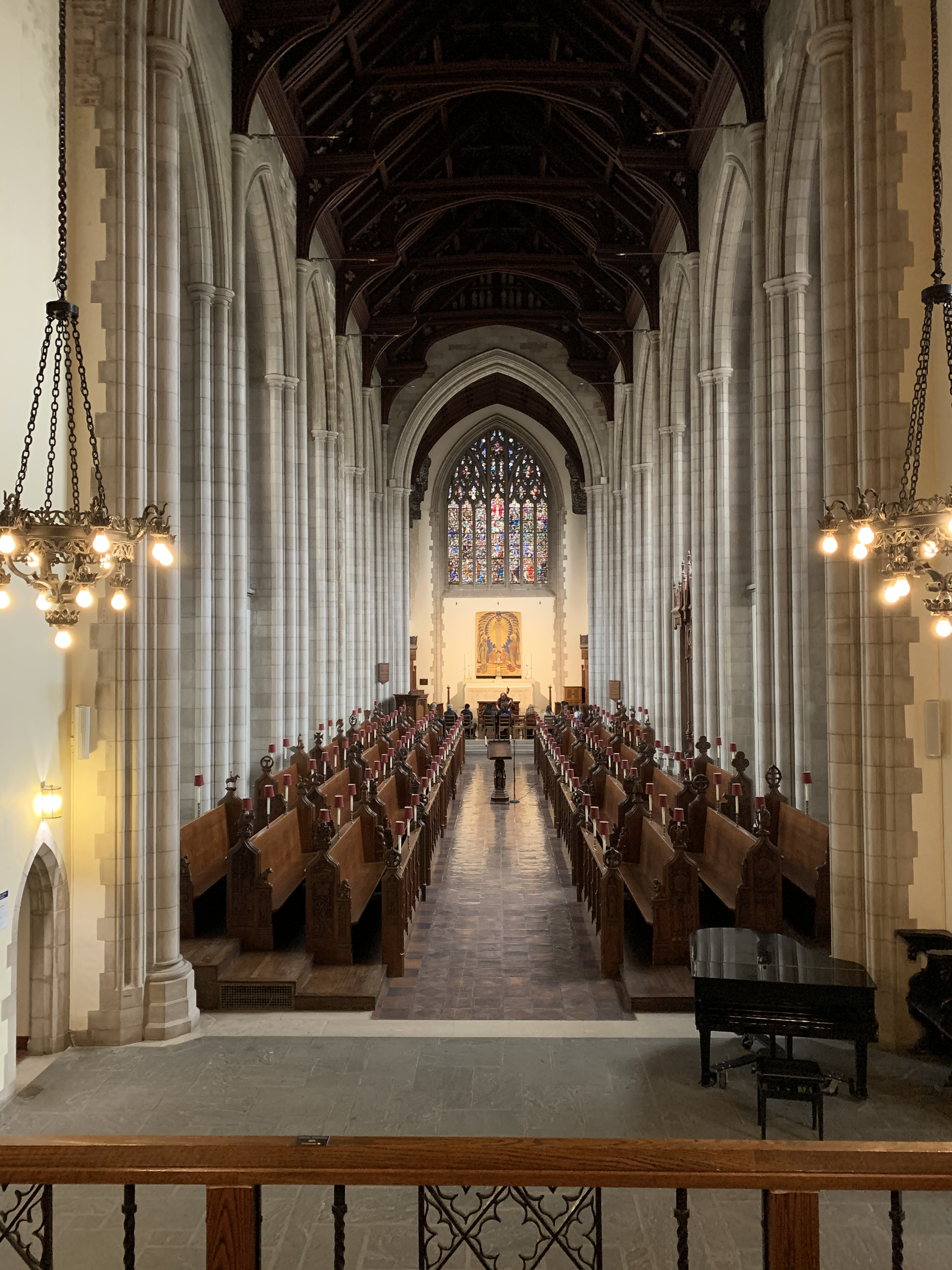
View from the organ loft

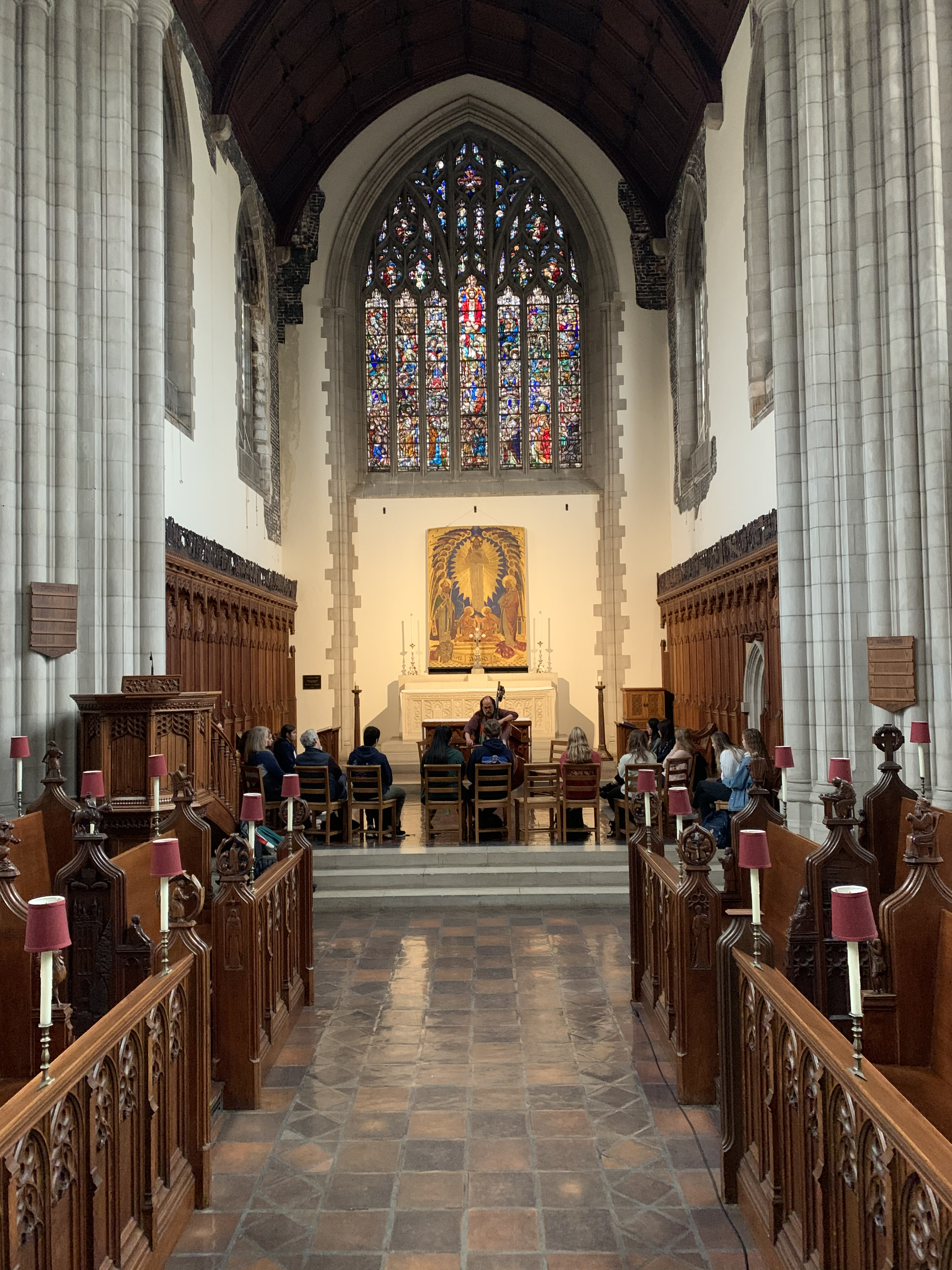
Trinity College Chapel
