= Amory Ballroom =

- U.S. National Register of Historic Places
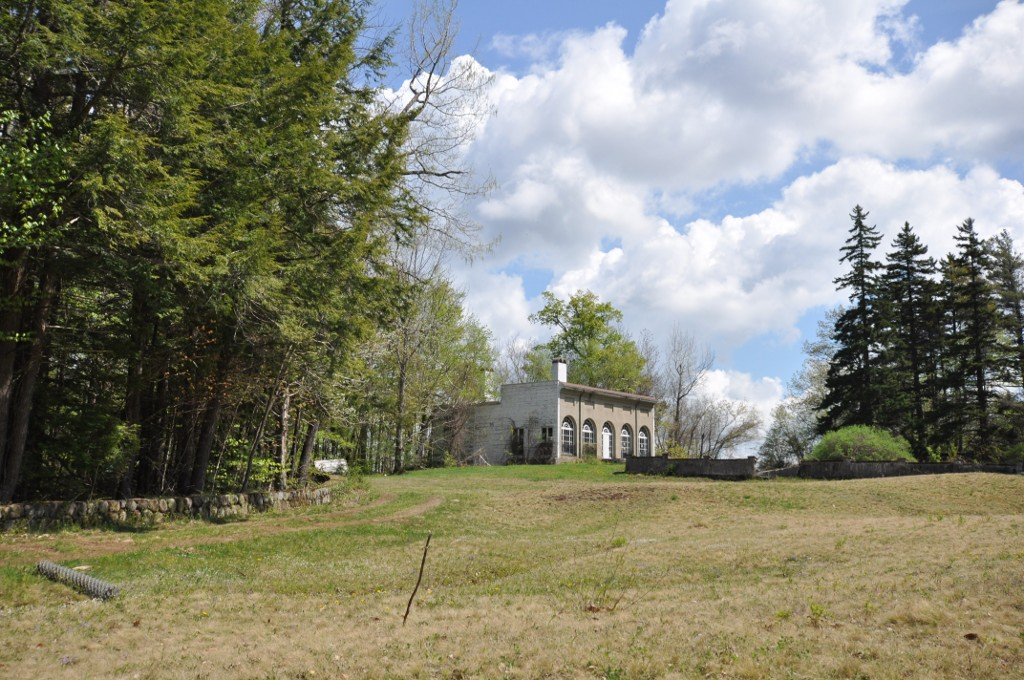

- Location within New Hampshire Location within the United States
- Location: Off Old Troy Rd., Dublin, New Hampshire
- Coordinates: 42°53′33″N 72°5′53″W
- Area: 0.3 acres (0.12 ha)
- Built: 1910
- Architect: Goodell, Charles; Harry Little
- Architectural style: Late 19th And 20th Century Revivals, Italian Renaissance Revival
- MPS: Dublin MRA
- NRHP reference No.: 85000921
- Added to NRHP: May 2, 1985

The Amory Ballroom is the only surviving remnant of a large summer estate house off Old Troy Road in Dublin, New Hampshire. Built in two stages (1910 and 1926–27), it is an architecturally distinctive reminder of the community's early 20th-century period as a summer resort area. The building was listed on the National Register of Historic Places in 1985.

== Description and history ==
The Amory Ballroom is located on the grounds of the former Amory country estate, a large tract of land rising on the northern slope of Mount Monadnock between Old Troy Road to the west and the mountain's Pumpelly Ridge to the east. It is accessed via a private road that snakes across the historic estate. It stands in a grassy clearing that includes remains of the estate's formal garden and swimming pool. The building is a rectangular single-story structure, finished with stucco and covered by a flat roof at two different heights. The front of the building, facing toward the mountain peak, is defined by five large round-arch bays with the main entrance in the center bay. The interior of the space includes a Renaissance style fireplace, and is decorated with tile from Henry Chapman Mercer's Moravian Pottery and Tile Works in Doylestown, Pennsylvania.

The original house, a palatial Italian villa, was built 1910-11 by the widow of William Amory, and was designed by Boston architect Charles Goodell. Of this construction, only the entrance hall survives; the ballroom, set behind the entrance hall, was designed by Harry Little and built 1926–27. This section was originally flanked by large three-story sections, giving the building a total length of more than 100 feet (30 m). The Amory family actively used the property until after World War II, when many of its elements were torn down.

== See also ==
- National Register of Historic Places listings in Cheshire County, New Hampshire
