= List of census-designated places in New Hampshire =

Map of the United States with New Hampshire highlighted

This article lists incorporated places and census-designated places (CDPs) in the U.S. state of New Hampshire. As of 2020, there were a total of 13 incorporated places in New Hampshire, and 88 census-designated places.

== Incorporated places ==
No.	City	Population	County
1	Berlin	9,425	Coös
2	Claremont	12,949	Sullivan
3	Concord	43,976	Merrimack
4	Dover	32,741	Strafford
5	Franklin	8,741	Merrimack
6	Keene	23,047	Cheshire
7	Laconia	16,871	Belknap
8	Lebanon	14,282	Grafton
9	Manchester	115,644	Hillsborough
10	Nashua	91,322	Hillsborough
11	Portsmouth	21,956	Rockingham
12	Rochester	32,492	Strafford
13	Somersworth	11,855	Strafford

== Census-designated places ==
No.	CDP	Population	Town	County
1	Alton	501	Alton	Belknap
2	Amherst	613	Amherst	Hillsborough
3	Antrim	1,397	Antrim	Hillsborough
4	Ashland	1,244	Ashland	Grafton
5	Bartlett	373	Bartlett	Carroll
6	Belmont	1,301	Belmont	Belknap
7	Bennington	381	Bennington	Hillsborough
8	Bethlehem	972	Bethlehem	Grafton
9	Bradford	356	Bradford	Merrimack
10	Bristol	1,688	Bristol	Grafton
11	Canaan	524	Canaan	Grafton
12	Charlestown	1,152	Charlestown	Sullivan
13	Colebrook	1,394	Colebrook	Coös
14	Conway	1,823	Conway	Carroll
15	North Conway	2,349	Conway	Carroll
16	Derry	22,015	Derry	Rockingham
17	Durham	10,345	Durham	Strafford
18	Enfield	1,540	Enfield	Grafton
19	Epping	1,681	Epping	Rockingham
20	Exeter	9,242	Exeter	Rockingham
21	Farmington	3,885	Farmington	Strafford
22	Francestown	201	Francestown	Hillsborough
23	Goffstown	3,196	Goffstown	Hillsborough
24	Pinardville	4,780	Goffstown	Hillsborough
25	Gorham	1,600	Gorham	Coös
26	Greenville	1,108	Greenville	Hillsborough
27	Hampton	9,656	Hampton	Rockingham
28	Hampton Beach	2,275	Hampton	Rockingham
29	Hancock	204	Hancock	Hillsborough
30	Hanover	8,636	Hanover	Grafton
31	Woodsville	1,126	Haverhill	Grafton
32	North Haverhill	843	Haverhill	Grafton
33	Mountain Lakes	488	Haverhill	Grafton
33	Mountain Lakes	488	Bath	Grafton
34	Henniker	1,747	Henniker	Merrimack
35	Hillsborough	1,976	Hillsborough	Hillsborough
36	Hinsdale	1,548	Hinsdale	Cheshire
37	Hooksett	4,147	Hooksett	Merrimack
38	South Hooksett	5,418	Hooksett	Merrimack
39	Contoocook	1,444	Hopkinton	Merrimack
40	Hudson	7,336	Hudson	Hillsborough
41	Jaffrey	2,757	Jaffrey	Cheshire
42	Lancaster	1,725	Lancaster	Coös
43	Lincoln	993	Lincoln	Grafton
44	Lisbon	980	Lisbon	Grafton
45	Littleton	4,412	Littleton	Grafton
46	Londonderry	11,037	Londonderry	Rockingham
47	Loudon	559	Loudon	Merrimack
48	Marlborough	1,094	Marlborough	Cheshire
49	Meredith	1,718	Meredith	Belknap
50	East Merrimack	4,197	Merrimack	Hillsborough
51	Milford	8,835	Milford	Hillsborough
52	Milton	575	Milton	Strafford
54	Milton Mills	299	Milton	Strafford
55	Suissevale	249	Moultonborough	Carroll
56	Klondike Corner	652	New Boston	Hillsborough
57	New Boston	326	New Boston	Hillsborough
58	New Hampton	351	New Hampton	Belknap
59	New London	1,415	New London	Merrimack
60	Blodgett Landing	101	Newbury	Merrimack
61	Newfields	301	Newfields	Rockingham
62	Newmarket	5,297	Newmarket	Rockingham
63	Newport	4,769	Newport	Sullivan
64	Groveton	1,118	Northumberland	Coös
65	Center Ossipee	561	Ossipee	Carroll
66	Suncook	5,379	Pembroke	Merrimack
66	Suncook	5,379	Allenstown	Merrimack
67	Peterborough	3,103	Peterborough	Hillsborough
68	Pittsfield	1,576	Pittsfield	Merrimack
69	Plainfield	205	Plainfield	Sullivan
70	Plymouth	4,456	Plymouth	Grafton
71	Raymond	2,855	Raymond	Rockingham
72	Center Sandwich	123	Sandwich	Carroll
73	Seabrook Beach	992	Seabrook	Rockingham
73	Seabrook Beach	992	Hampton	Rockingham
74	West Stewartstown	386	Stewartstown	Coös
75	West Swanzey	1,308	Swanzey	Cheshire
76	Melvin Village	241	Tuftonboro	Carroll
77	Tilton Northfield	3,075	Tilton	Belknap
77	Tilton Northfield	3,075	Northfield	Merrimack
78	Troy	1,221	Troy	Cheshire
79	Sanbornville	1,056	Wakefield	Carroll
80	Union	204	Wakefield	Carroll
81	North Walpole	785	Walpole	Cheshire
82	Walpole	605	Walpole	Cheshire
83	Warner	444	Warner	Merrimack
84	Whitefield	1,142	Whitefield	Coös
85	Wilton	1,163	Wilton	Hillsborough
85	Wilton	1,163	Milford	Hillsborough
86	Winchester	1,733	Winchester	Cheshire
87	Wolfeboro	2,838	Wolfeboro	Carroll
88	North Woodstock	528	Woodstock	Grafton

== See also ==
- List of municipalities in New Hampshire
- List of counties in New Hampshire
