= New Hampshire Route 149 =

State highway in Hillsborough County, New Hampshire, US

New Hampshire Route 149
- Map of Hillsborough County in southern New Hampshire with NH 149 highlighted in red

Route information
- Maintained by NHDOT
- Length: 13.756 mi (22.138 km)

Major junctions
- West end: US 202 in Hillsborough
- East end: NH 77 in Weare

Location
- Country: United States
- State: New Hampshire
- Counties: Hillsborough

Highway system
- New Hampshire Highway System; Interstate; US; State; Turnpikes
← NH 145	→ NH 150

New Hampshire Route 149 (abbreviated NH 149) is a 13.756-mile-long (22.138 km) secondary east–west state highway in Hillsborough County in the southern part of the U.S. state of New Hampshire. The road runs between the towns of Weare and Hillsborough.

The eastern terminus of NH 149 is in Weare at New Hampshire Route 77 in the area known as South Weare. The western terminus is in the center of Hillsborough at U.S. Route 202 and New Hampshire Route 9. In Hillsborough, NH 149 is known as Bridge Street. Between Weare and Hillsborough, the highway provides access to Deering Reservoir and Pleasant Pond.

== Major intersections ==
The entire route is in Hillsborough County.

Location	mi	km	Destinations	Notes
Hillsborough	0.000	0.000	US 202 to NH 9 – Peterborough, Keene, Concord	Western terminus
Weare	13.756	22.138	NH 77 south – New Boston To NH 114 – Henniker, Goffstown	Eastern terminus
1.000 mi = 1.609 km; 1.000 km = 0.621 mi
