= New Hampshire Route 114 =

State highway in central New Hampshire, US

New Hampshire Route 114
- NH 114 highlighted in red

Route information
- Maintained by NHDOT
- Length: 60.433 mi (97.257 km)
- Existed: 1931–present

Major junctions
- South end: NH 101 in Bedford
- US 202 / NH 9 in Henniker; NH 11 in New London
- North end: NH 10 in Grantham

Location
- Country: United States
- State: New Hampshire
- Counties: Hillsborough, Merrimack, Sullivan

Highway system
- New Hampshire Highway System; Interstate; US; State; Turnpikes
← NH 113B	→ NH 115
← Route 30B	N.E.	→ Route 32A

New Hampshire Route 114 (abbreviated NH 114) is a 60.433-mile-long (97.257 km) secondary north–south highway in central New Hampshire. The highway runs between Bedford in Hillsborough County and Grantham in Sullivan County.

The southern terminus of NH 114 is at New Hampshire Route 101 in Bedford. The northern terminus is at New Hampshire Route 10 in Grantham. The highway maintains a northwest-southeast alignment from Bedford northward.

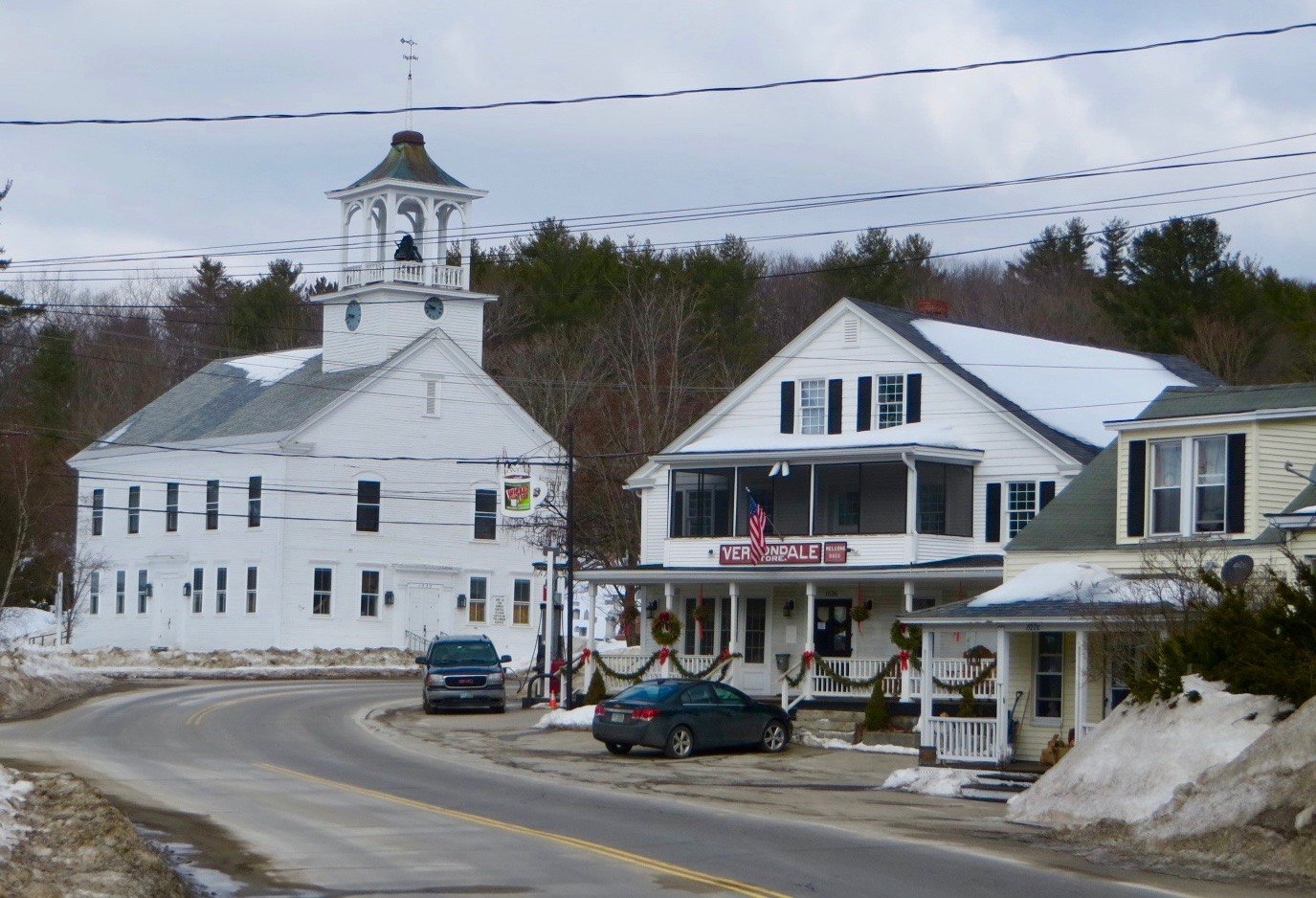
NH 114 makes a hard right turn traveling northbound through the village of North Sutton.

== Route description ==
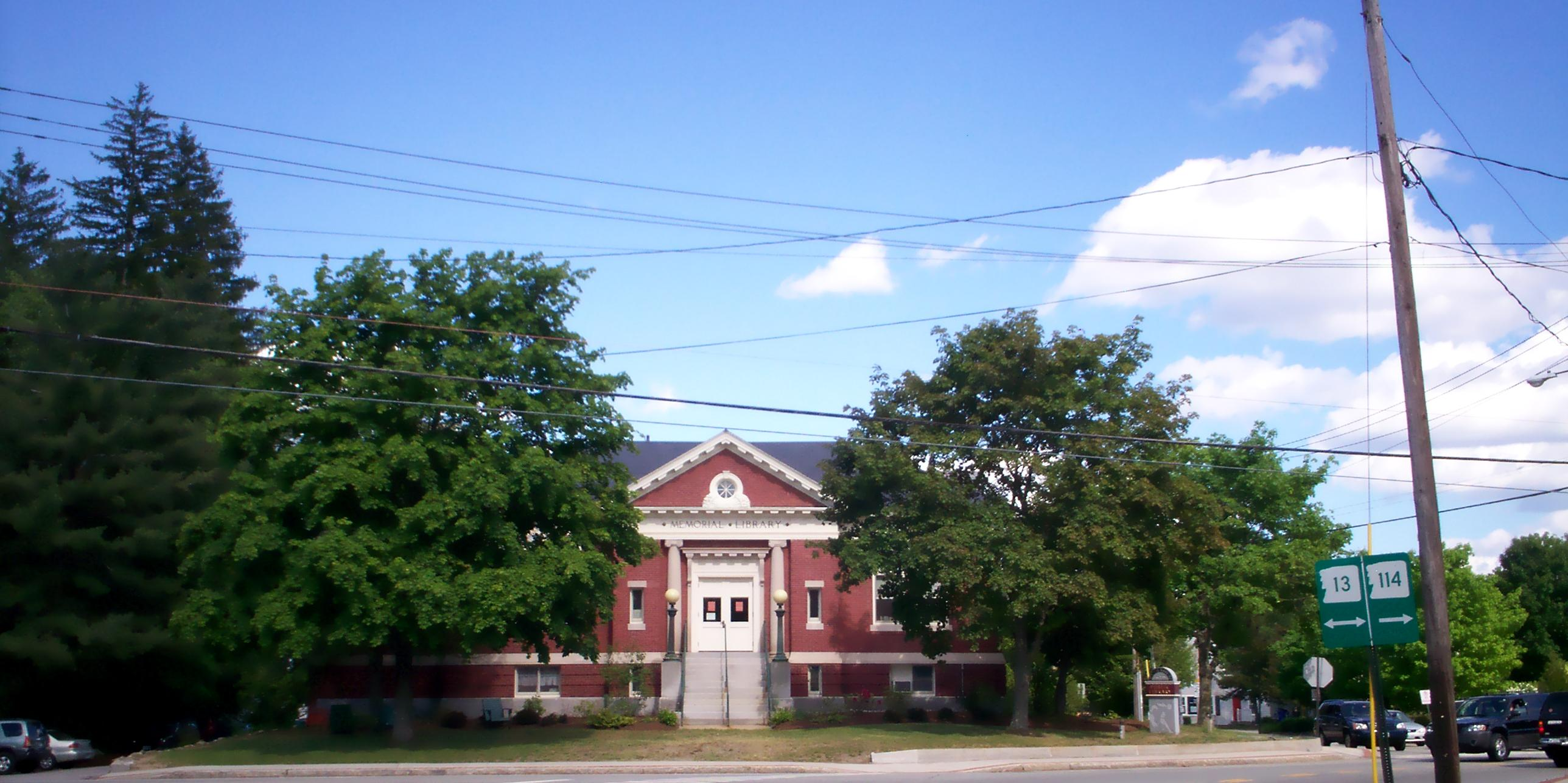
Goffstown Public Library at the junction of NH 13 and NH 114

NH 114's southern terminus is in the northeastern corner of Bedford at the end of the NH 101 freeway; at the intersection the freeway continues as NH 114 as a surface expressway while NH 101 turns left to follow Boynton Street. From here the route runs north-northwest into the town of Goffstown. This section of the road serves as a western bypass of Manchester, with no businesses and fairly limited crossings, and also serves as part of a route between NH 114A (the original Route 114), Interstate 93 and Manchester-Boston Regional Airport. At the intersection with Mast Road, NH 114 turns west to join Mast Road, while NH 114A has its western terminus here and heads into western Manchester, following Mast Road eastward. Mast Road becomes South Mast Street upon entering Goffstown village at the geographic center of the town. Upon meeting NH 13, the two routes join together for a short concurrency along Main Street through the center of the village, before NH 114 leaves to the west along North Mast Street while NH 13 continues north along High Street. Following the Piscataquog River, NH 114 passes briefly into the town of New Boston crossing the extreme northeastern corner of town, before entering the town of Weare.

Upon entering Weare, NH 114 changes its name to South Stark Highway, and passes by the north end of Daniels Lake. At Three Corners in Weare, NH 114 joins NH 77 in a concurrency, and also narrowly misses the eastern terminus of NH 149, which ends a short distance away. At the center of town at Weare village, the name changes to North Stark Highway. NH 77 leaves to the east after a bridge across the Piscataquog, then 114 leaves Weare and enters Henniker.

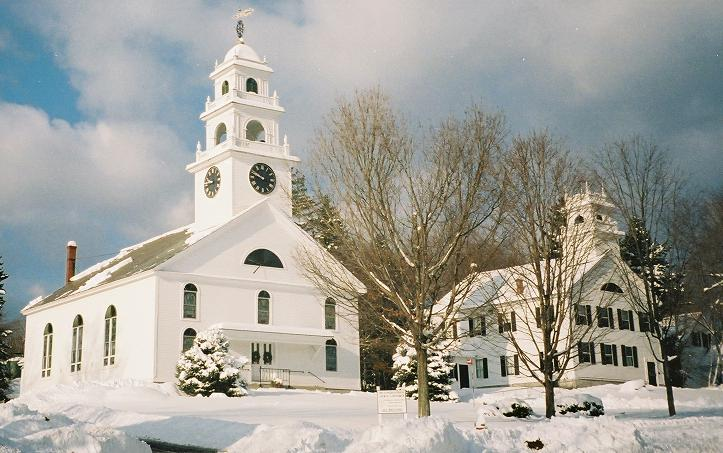
A view along NH 114 in Henniker in the winter.

In Henniker, NH 114 changes its name to Weare Road and travels northwestward through a rural area of the town. Passing Pats Peak ski area and New England College and crossing the Contoocook River, NH 114 follows Bridge Street and Maple Street through the main village of Henniker. At the northern edge of the village, NH 114 has an interchange with US 202/NH 9 and changes names once again to Bradford Road. Closely following Amey Brook, NH 114 crosses the extreme southwestern corner of Warner, though there are no intersections with roads connecting to the rest of Warner.

In Bradford, NH 114 passes close by the western shore of Lake Massasecum and meets NH 103 in the northeastern corner of the town, at the main village of Bradford. Nearby is Bement Covered Bridge and Todd Lake. NH 114 turns here from a northeasterly alignment to due north and enters the town of Sutton.

The main north–south road through Sutton, NH 114 passes by the northern end of Blaisdell Lake, crosses and then follows the northern bank of the Lane River, past the village of Sutton Mills, which has the Town Hall and acts as the main village of the town. It next enters the village of North Sutton, passing by Wadleigh State Park and Kezar Lake. It is known in this area as Sutton Road. It passes under, but does not interchange with Interstate 89; access between the two is provided by North Road (I-89 exit 10).

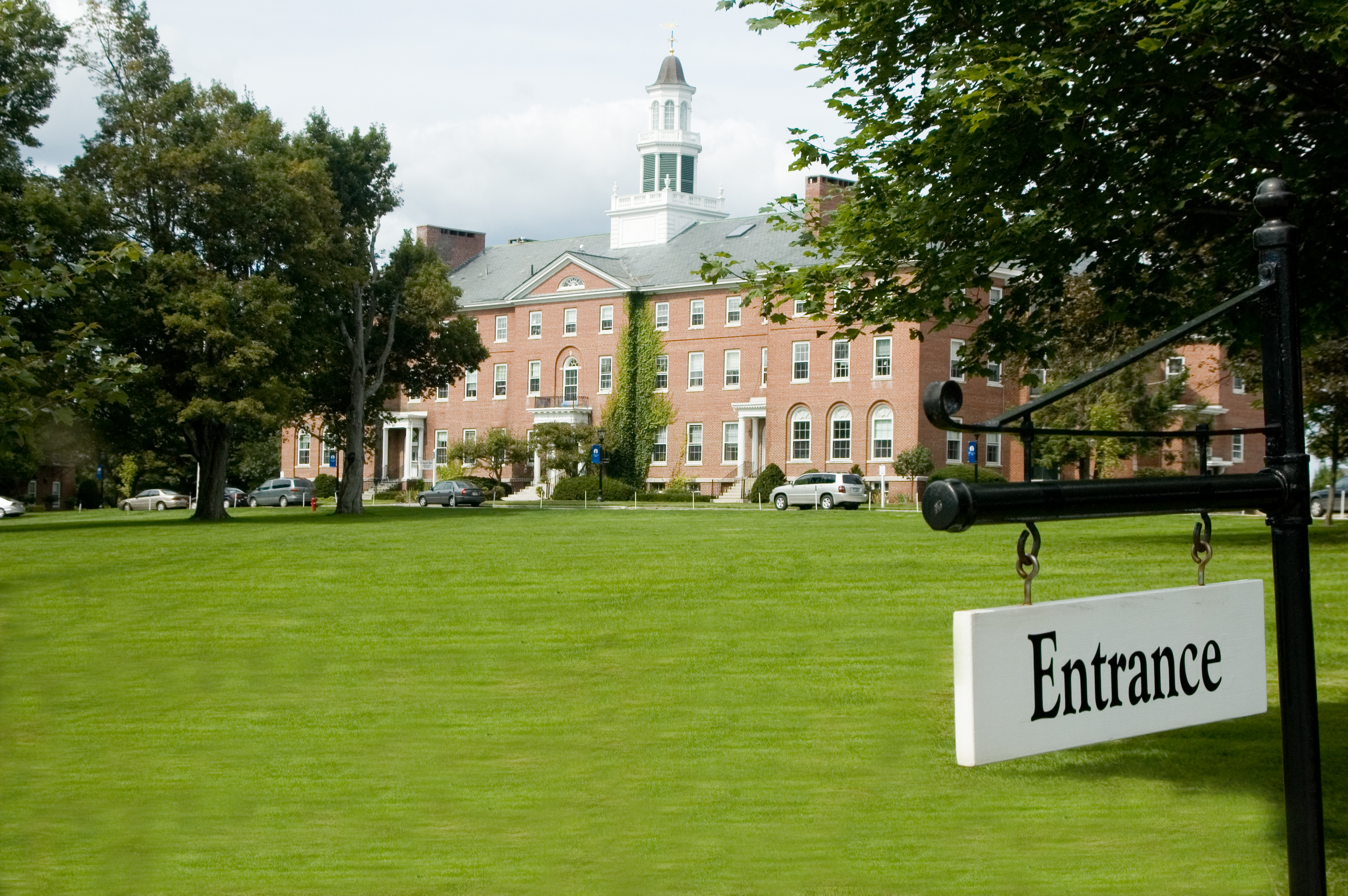
Colgate Hall at Colby-Sawyer College, as viewed from NH 114 in New London

Entering the town of New London along Sutton Road, NH 114 has an intersection with NH 11 and NH 114 turns back to the northwest. The road changes names to Main Street when entering the main village of New London, passing Colby Sawyer College. Newport Road to the west provides access to nearby Lake Sunapee and I-89 (exit 12), while NH 114 passes the eastern shore of Little Sunapee Lake along Little Sunapee Road. Turning westward at the northeastern corner of the lake, NH 114 enters Springfield.

In Springfield, the road closely hugs the north shore of Little Sunapee Lake, then turns north along Main Street, passing west of Gile State Forest. Passing the western shore of Kolelemook Lake, NH 114 passes to the west of the main village of Springfield, forming the main road through the village of West Springfield. NH 114 turns west, then south, then west again before entering the town of Grantham.

Known as Grantham Road in Grantham, NH 114 passes under (but again does not interchange with) I-89 near the northern end of Stocker Pond. Crossing Stocker Brook several times, NH 114 reaches its northern terminus at NH 10 in the main village of Grantham near the North Branch of the Sugar River.

== History ==

The portion of NH 114 between Western Avenue in Henniker and its junction with NH 103 in Bradford was originally part of New England Interstate Route 32 which was designated in 1922 and went between Groton, Connecticut, and Sunapee, New Hampshire. This section of the road retained this number until being redesignated as an extension of Route 114 sometime during the late 1930s. Before this point, NH 114 terminated in Henniker.

Most of NH 114 follows its original alignment from the 1930s, with a notable exception being the portion in Bedford which was constructed during the mid 1960s to serve as a connection to the NH 101 freeway in Bedford. Before this time, the route originally had its southern terminus with NH 101 at the intersections of Bridge Street and Candia Road in the eastern part of Manchester. It proceeded west along Bridge Street until reaching downtown Manchester, where it crossed the Merrimack River on the former Notre Dame Bridge. It continued up Amory Street before briefly turning north onto Coolidge Avenue and then continuing west on Kelley Street into Pinardville. Upon reaching Pinardville, it turned northwards on the modern NH 114A and continued on its original route until reaching its northern terminus.

Most of the route north of Bradford was eventually bypassed by Interstate 89, which it roughly follows between exits 10 and 13 near its northern terminus in Grantham. In Weare, the route passes by the site of the Pine Tree Tavern, where the Pine Tree Riot, an early event of the American Revolution, took place. The exact site is located near the town's Southern Fire Station just south of the junction with NH 77 and is marked by a millstone with a plaque denoting the event.

== Major intersections ==
County	Location	mi	km	Destinations	Notes
Hillsborough	Bedford	0.000	0.000	NH 101 to I-293 / Everett Turnpike / US 3 – Manchester, Bedford, Keene	Southern terminus
Hillsborough	Goffstown	3.582	5.765	NH 114A east (Mast Road) – Pinardville	Northern terminus of NH 114A
Hillsborough	Goffstown	7.417	11.937	NH 13 south (Pleasant Street) – New Boston, Milford	Southern end of concurrency with NH 13
Hillsborough	Goffstown	7.737	12.451	NH 13 north (High Street) – Dunbarton	Northern end of concurrency with NH 13
Hillsborough	Weare	14.593	23.485	NH 77 south (Dustin Tavern Road) to NH 149 – New Boston, Deering	Southern end of concurrency with NH 77
Hillsborough	Weare	18.972	30.532	NH 77 north (Concord Stage Road) – Dunbarton, Concord	Northern end of concurrency with NH 77
Merrimack	Henniker	26.279– 26.360	42.292– 42.422	US 202 (Franklin Pierce Highway) / NH 9 – Concord, Hillsborough, Keene	Interchange
Merrimack	Bradford	34.794	55.996	NH 103 – Sunapee, Warner	
Merrimack	Sutton	42.913	69.062	North Road to I-89 – Concord	Exit 10 on I-89
Merrimack	New London	46.042	74.097	NH 11 (King Hill Road) to I-89 – Newbury, Andover	
Merrimack	New London	48.491	78.039	Newport Road to I-89 – Newport	Exit 12 on I-89
Sullivan	Springfield	52.261	84.106	Georges Mills Road to I-89 – Georges Mills, Sunapee	Exit 12A on I-89
Sullivan	Springfield	55.197	88.831	Four Corners Road to NH 4A	
Sullivan	Grantham	60.433	97.257	NH 10 – Newport, Lebanon	Northern terminus
1.000 mi = 1.609 km; 1.000 km = 0.621 mi: Concurrency terminus

== Suffixed routes ==
New Hampshire Route 114A
- Location: Manchester–Goffstown
- Length: 3.696 mi (5.948 km)

New Hampshire Route 114A (abbreviated NH 114A) is a 3.696-mile-long (5.948 km) north–south highway in Hillsborough County in southeast New Hampshire. The highway connects downtown Manchester with Goffstown and forms the main thoroughfare through the village of Pinardville on the Goffstown/Manchester line..

The southern terminus of NH 114A is at U.S. Route 3 and New Hampshire Route 3A in Manchester on the west side of the Merrimack River. The northern terminus is at the junction with New Hampshire Route 114 in Goffstown. It is known as Mast Road, and follows a northwest–southeast routing into Manchester. In Manchester, it follows Varney Street, Main Street, West Hancock Street and Second Street before coming to an end at the complex interchange between I-293/Everett Turnpike and the Queen City Bridge/US 3/NH 3A.
