= Klondike Corner, New Hampshire =

Census-designated place in New Hampshire, United States

- Census-designated place
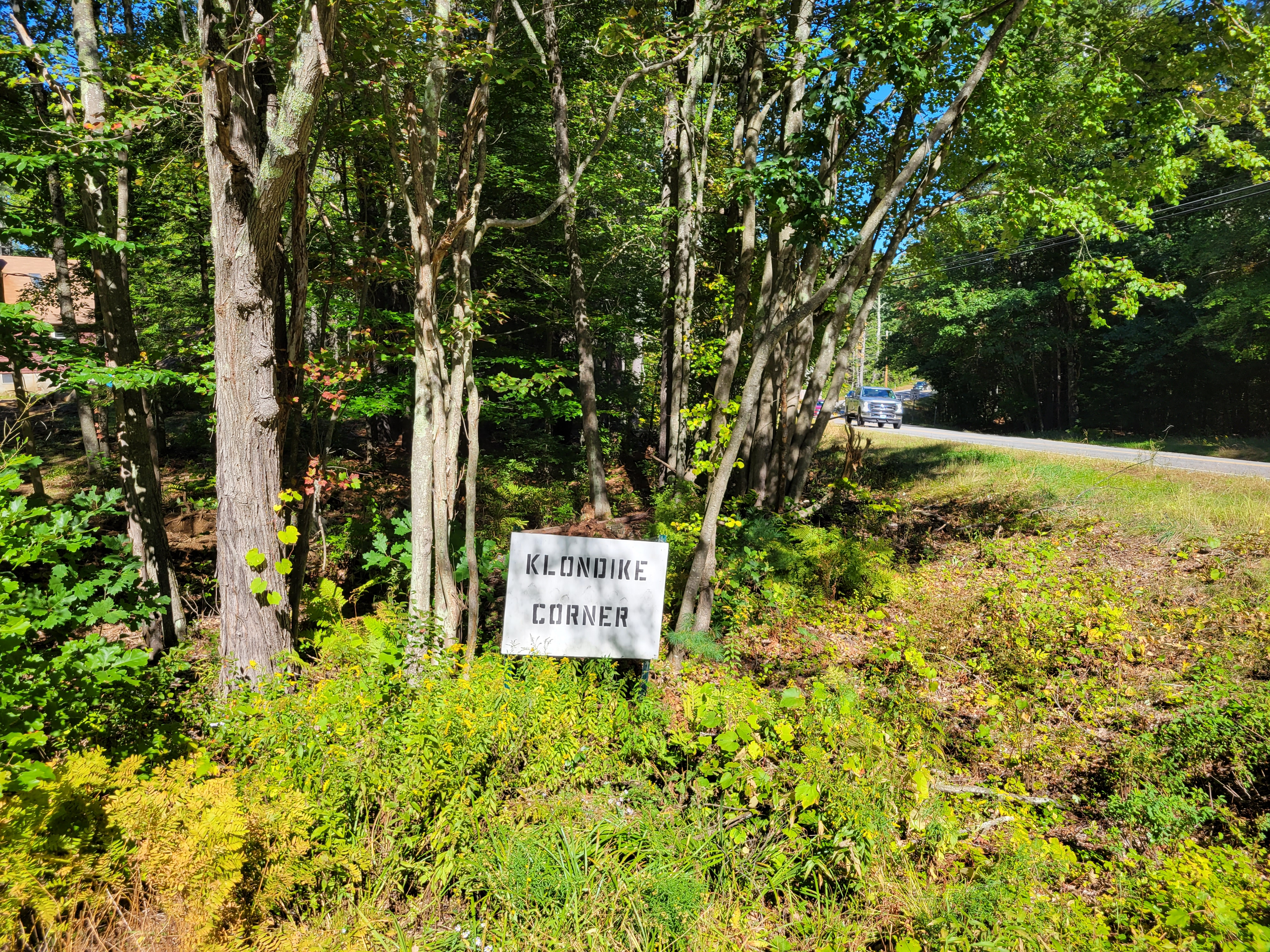
- Klondike Corner sign

- Location within New Hampshire Location within the United States
- Coordinates: 42°57′48″N 71°38′14″W
- Country: United States
- State: New Hampshire
- County: Hillsborough
- Town: New Boston

Area
  - Total: 3.42 sq mi (8.86 km^{2})
  - Land: 3.39 sq mi (8.77 km^{2})
  - Water: 0.035 sq mi (0.09 km^{2})
- Elevation: 671 ft (205 m)

Population (2020)
  - Total: 652
  - Density: 192.5/sq mi (74.33/km^{2})
- Time zone: UTC-5 (Eastern (EST))
  - Summer (DST): UTC-4 (EDT)
- ZIP code: 03070 (New Boston)
- Area code: 603
- FIPS code: 33-40120
- GNIS feature ID: 2806680

Klondike Corner is a census-designated place (CDP) in the town of New Boston, New Hampshire, United States. As of the 2020 census the population was 652.

== Geography ==
The CDP is in the southeastern part of New Boston and includes the original hamlet of Klondike Corner in the southeastern corner, at the intersection of Chestnut Hill Road and Bedford Road. The CDP is bordered to the east by the town of Bedford and to the south by the New Boston Air Force Station. Bedford Road forms the northeastern and northern borders of the CDP, and Old County Road and Laurel Lane form the western edge. The CDP is 2 to 6 miles (3 to 10 km) southeast of the main village of New Boston and 10 miles (16 km) west of downtown Manchester.

According to the U.S. Census Bureau, the CDP has a total area of 3.4 square miles (8.9 km^{2}), of which 0.03 square miles (0.09 km^{2}), or 1.02%, are water. Bog Brook, flowing through the eastern part of the community, drains the CDP and runs north to the Piscataquog River in Goffstown, part of the Merrimack River watershed.

== Demographics ==
Historical population
Census	Pop.	Note	%±
2020	652		—
U.S. Decennial Census

Klondike Corner was first listed as a census designated place in the 2020 U.S. census.
