= NH 77 =

NH 77 may refer to:

- National Highway 77 (India)
- New Hampshire Route 77, United States
