= NH 13 =

NH 13 may refer to:

- National Highway 13 (India)
- New Hampshire Route 13, United States
