= Joseph Reed Whipple =

American businessman (1842-1912)

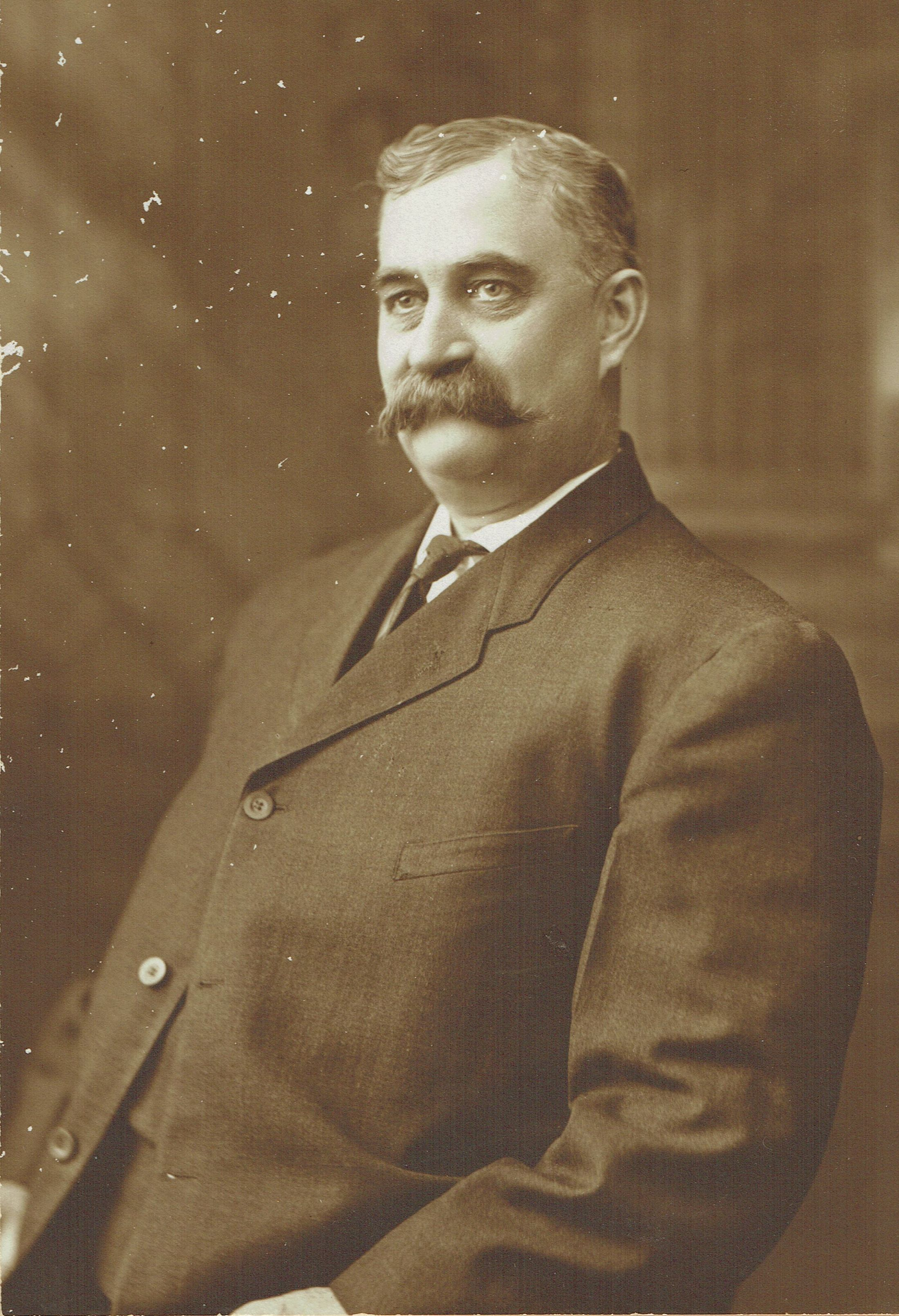
- Born: Joseph Reed Whipple; 8 September 1842; New Boston, New Hampshire
- Died: 15 June 1912 (aged 69); Boston, Massachusetts
- Occupation: Hotelier

Joseph Reed Whipple (September 8, 1842 - June 15, 1912) was an American businessman who owned and operated hotels in Boston, Massachusetts, including the Parker House, Young's Hotel, and the Hotel Touraine. He was described as "one of the best known hotel men in America." By the time of his death Whipple had become "one of the foremost business men of Boston and amassed a fortune said to amount over $2,000,000."

== Early life ==
J. Reed Whipple was born September 8, 1842, in New Boston, New Hampshire, to John and Philantha (Reed) Whipple. He was educated in New Boston schools until he was eighteen, when he went to Boston to open a grocery store with his brother James B. Whipple.

== Career ==
After the Whipple brothers' store failed, J. Reed Whipple worked in a Boston restaurant and became interested in the hotel business. In the late 1860s he approached Harvey D. Parker in his Parker House hotel and asked for a job. Parker asked him, "What can you do?" Whipple replied, "Anything." Parker said, "I like your grit!" and took the young man to the hotel basement where he put him to work opening oysters. Whipple was soon promoted to the steward's office at the Parker House, where he worked for nine years.

In 1876 Whipple and his partner George Hall became proprietors of Young's Hotel. In 1891 Whipple, by then the sole proprietor of Young's Hotel, bought the Parker House, too. In 1892 Whipple ordered the waiters in his hotels to remove their beards, an edict which was widely reported in the nation's press. An editorial in the Pittsburgh Dispatch encouraged the waiters to strike before submitting to "such a manifestation of sumptuary despotism. The beard of the juggler with hotel crockery is as dear to him as the hirsute magnificence of any other man." A delegation from the Boston Waiters Alliance informed Whipple that no one would comply with his order, which he rescinded after some deliberation.

When the New Boston, New Hampshire, town center burned in May 1887, Whipple provided financial assistance to people who had lost their homes and businesses, donated half the cost of rebuilding the town hall and the school, and built a new general store to replace one that had burned. The following year Whipple established New Boston's first public library in one corner of the general store and donated 2,000 books to the library.

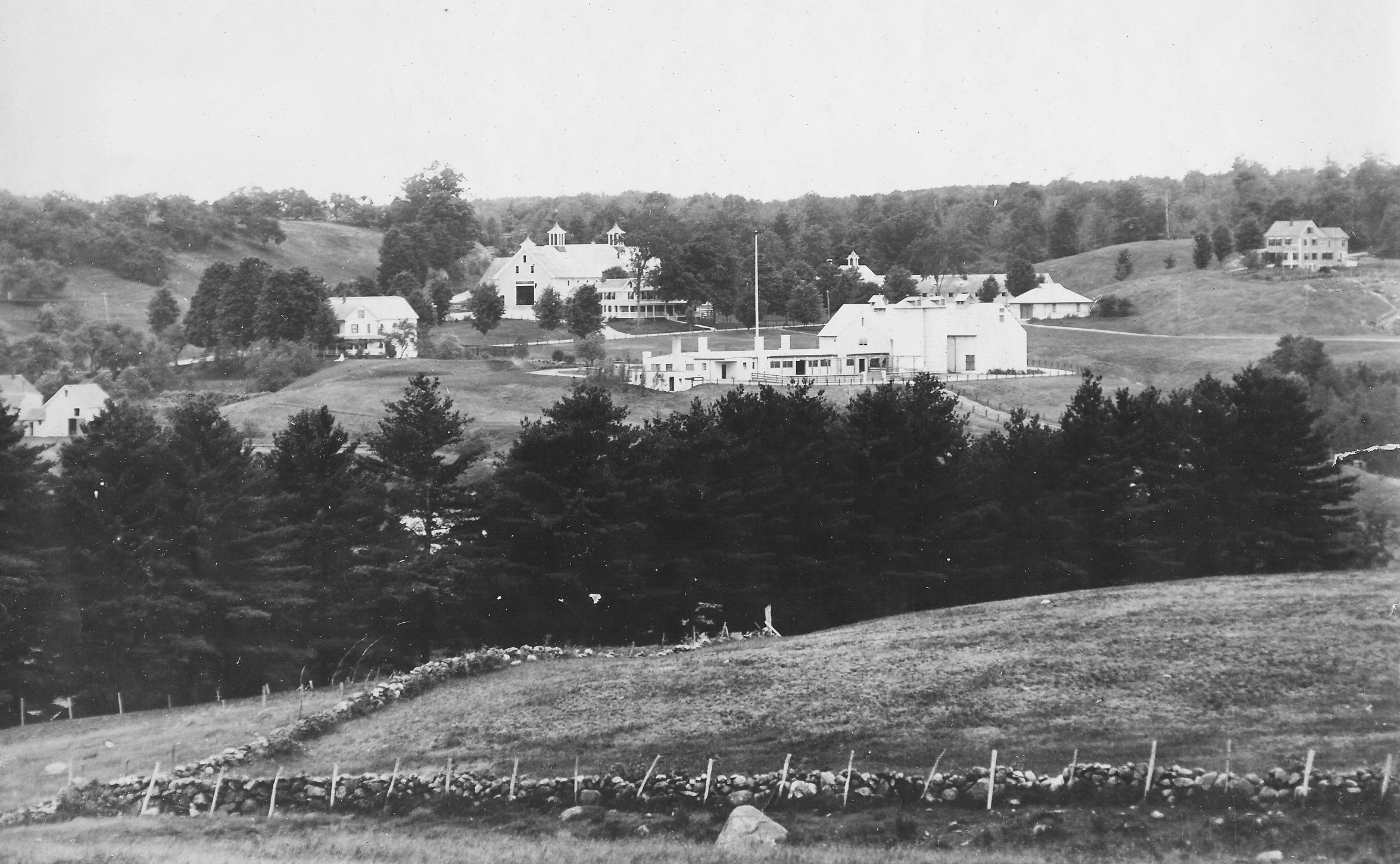
Whipple's Valley View Farm c.1910

Whipple purchased 2,500 acres (1,000 ha) of farm land in his home town of New Boston to establish his Valley View Farm with a modern dairy barn and creamery to supply his Boston hotels with milk, cream, butter, eggs, and pork. He employed 90 men to tend to his 350 cattle, 2,000 chickens, and 1,800 Yorkshire pigs. Whipple encouraged the construction of the New Boston Railroad, which opened in 1893 to connect New Boston - and Whipple's farm - to Manchester, New Hampshire, and Boston. Trains left New Boston twice daily with produce for the Boston hotels and returned with barrels of slops to feed the pigs.

In 1911 Whipple invited 450 hotel men and guests to travel from Boston to New Boston by a special train to tour his Valley View Farm. Tables were set up in the hay barn for a luncheon prepared by the chef of the Touraine and seven cooks, served by 70 waiters. An orchestra played in one corner of the barn.

In 1897 Whipple built a new hotel, the Touraine, "Boston's finest hotel", at a cost of $3,000,000. At the time of his death in 1912 Whipple had plans for a new hotel at the corner of Newbury and Arlington streets in Boston.

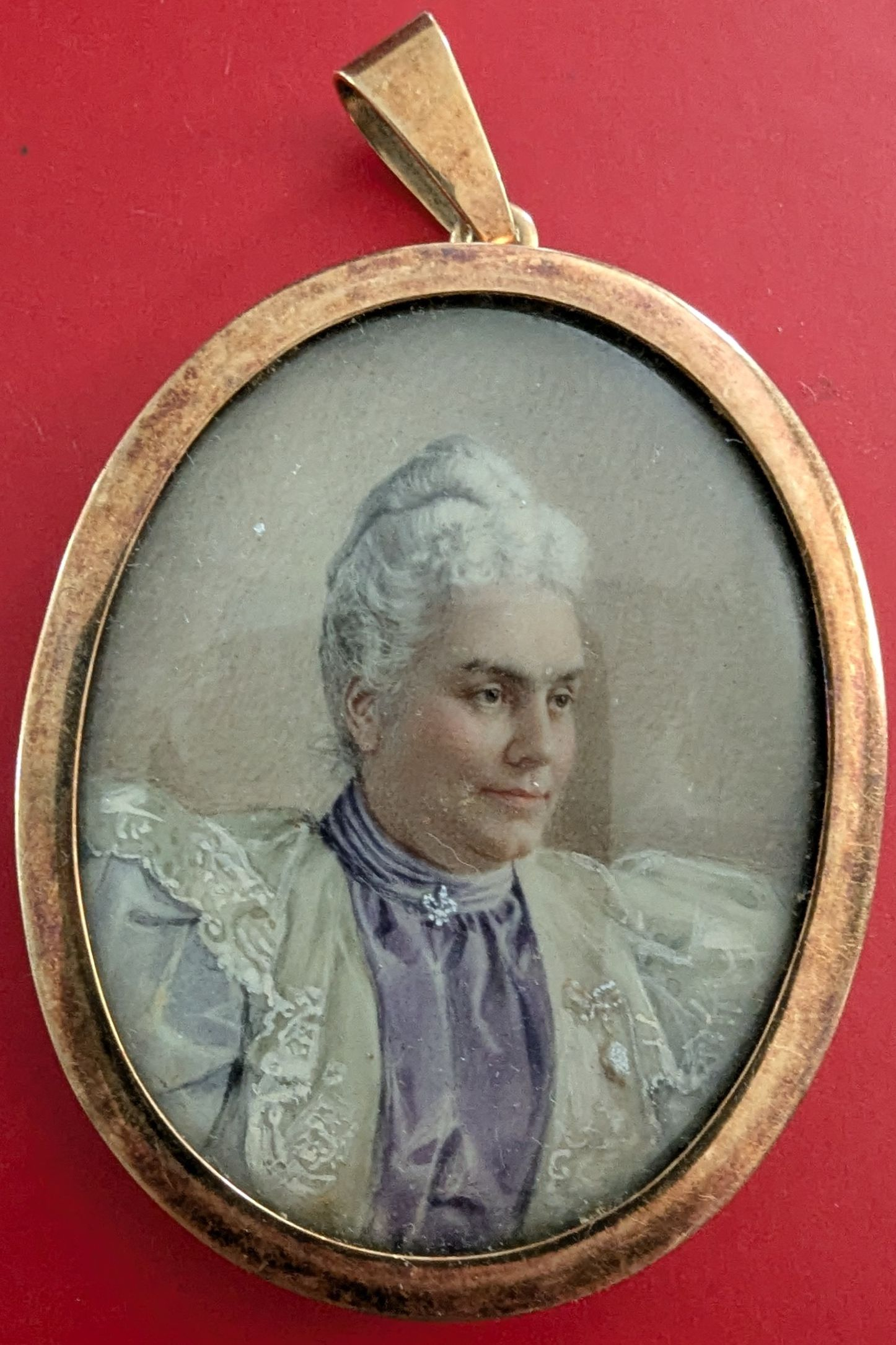
1895 miniature of Rose Gay Whipple, wife of J. Reed Whipple

== Marriage and family ==
J. Reed Whipple married Rose Gay Higgins (1843–1918) of Bangor, Maine, in 1865. Their son John Reed Whipple (1871–1899) worked in his father's business. Their daughter Lizzie May Whipple (1868-1942) married Edgar Pierce (1870-1929) and had one son, Roger Pierce (1898-1936).

== Death ==
J. Reed Whipple died in Boston June 15, 1912, after an operation for cancer of the stomach. He left no will; his wife and daughter inherited his estate, estimated at $3,000,000.
