= New Hampshire Route 136 =

State highway in Hillsborough County, New Hampshire, US

New Hampshire Route 136
- Map of Hillsborough County in southern New Hampshire with NH 136 highlighted in red

Route information
- Maintained by NHDOT
- Length: 17.459 mi (28.098 km)

Major junctions
- West end: US 202 / NH 123 in Peterborough
- NH 31 in Greenfield
- East end: NH 13 / NH 77 in New Boston

Location
- Country: United States
- State: New Hampshire
- Counties: Hillsborough

Highway system
- New Hampshire Highway System; Interstate; US; State; Turnpikes
← NH 135	→ NH 137

New Hampshire Route 136 (abbreviated NH 136) is a 17.459-mile-long (28.098 km) east–west state highway in Hillsborough County in southern New Hampshire. The road connects New Boston and Peterborough.

The eastern terminus of NH 136 is at New Hampshire Route 13 in New Boston. The western terminus is in Peterborough at U.S. Route 202 and New Hampshire Route 123.

== Major intersections ==
The entire route is in Hillsborough County.

Location	mi	km	Destinations	Notes
Peterborough	0.000	0.000	US 202 / NH 123 – Peterborough, Hancock	Western terminus
Greenfield	5.544	8.922	NH 31 north – Bennington	Western end of concurrency with NH 31
Greenfield	5.601	9.014	NH 31 south – Lyndeborough, Wilton	Eastern end of concurrency with NH 31
Francestown	9.926	15.974	NH 47 north – Bennington	Southern terminus of NH 47
New Boston	17.124	27.558	NH 77 north – Weare	Northern end of concurrency with NH 77
New Boston	17.459	28.098	NH 13 – Mont Vernon, Goffstown, Manchester; NH 77	Eastern terminus Southern terminus of NH 77
1.000 mi = 1.609 km; 1.000 km = 0.621 mi: Concurrency terminus
