= New Hampshire Route 77 =

State highway in southern New Hampshire, US

New Hampshire Route 77
- Map of southern New Hampshire with NH 77 highlighted in red

Route information
- Maintained by NHDOT
- Length: 17.874 mi (28.765 km)

Major junctions
- west end: NH 13 NH 136 in New Boston
- east end: NH 13 in Dunbarton

Location
- Country: United States
- State: New Hampshire
- Counties: Hillsborough, Merrimack

Highway system
- New Hampshire Highway System; Interstate; US; State; Turnpikes
← NH 75	→ NH 78

New Hampshire Route 77 (abbreviated NH 77) is a 17.874-mile-long (28.765 km) nominally east–west highway in Hillsborough and Merrimack counties in southern New Hampshire. It runs from New Boston to Dunbarton. Though labeled as east–west, the road has a north–south alignment for half of its length.

The western terminus is in New Boston at New Hampshire Route 13 and New Hampshire Route 136. The eastern terminus of NH 77 is in Dunbarton at New Hampshire Route 13.

== Route description ==
NH 77's western terminus is at NH 13 in New Boston, just north of the town's central village, where it forks off to the north on Weare Road. Entering Weare, the road changes names to Dustin Tavern Road. At Country Three Corners, it meets the eastern terminus of NH 149 and merges with NH 114, where the name changes to South Stark Highway. Heading due north and passing by the eastern slopes of Mount Wallingford, the two routes cross through the main village of Weare at the center of town, where the road becomes North Stark Highway. and upon crossing the Piscataquog River, at a hard right turn NH 77 leaves NH 114/Stark Highway to join Concord Stage Road. Winding past Weare Town Forest and leaving near the northeast corner of the town, NH 77 enters Dunbarton near the northern end of town and reaches its eastern terminus at NH 13.

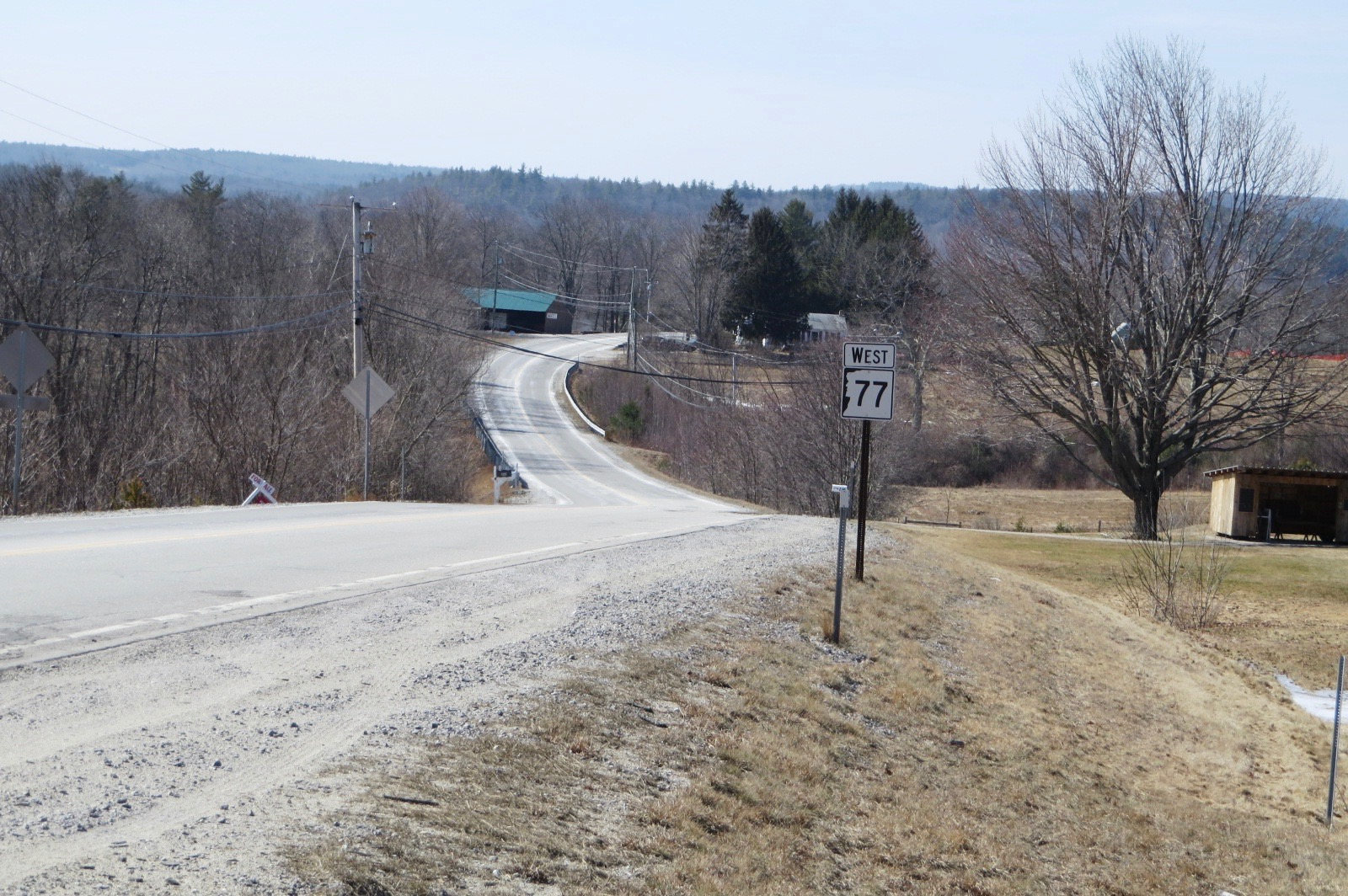
NH 77 at Sugar Hill Road in the town of Weare

== Major intersections ==
County	Location	mi	km	Destinations	Notes
Hillsborough	New Boston	0.000	0.000	NH 13 (Mont Vernon Road/Meetinghouse Hill Road) – Mont Vernon, Goffstown, Manchester	Southern terminus; southern end of concurrency with NH 136; eastern terminus of NH 136
Hillsborough	New Boston	0.335	0.539	NH 136 west (Francestown Road) – Francestown, Peterborough	Northern end of concurrency with NH 136 to NH 47
Hillsborough	Weare	6.005	9.664	NH 149 west (Deering Center Road) – Deering, Hillsborough	Eastern terminus of NH 149
Hillsborough	Weare	6.143	9.886	NH 114 south (South Stark Highway) – Goffstown	Southern end of concurrency with NH 114
Hillsborough	Weare	10.522	16.934	NH 114 (North Stark Highway) – Henniker	Northern end of concurrency with NH 114
Merrimack	Dunbarton	17.874	28.765	NH 13 (Stark Highway North) – Concord, Goffstown	Northern terminus
1.000 mi = 1.609 km; 1.000 km = 0.621 mi: Concurrency terminus
