= New Boston (CDP), New Hampshire =

Census-designated place in New Hampshire, United States

New Boston, New Hampshire
- Census-designated place
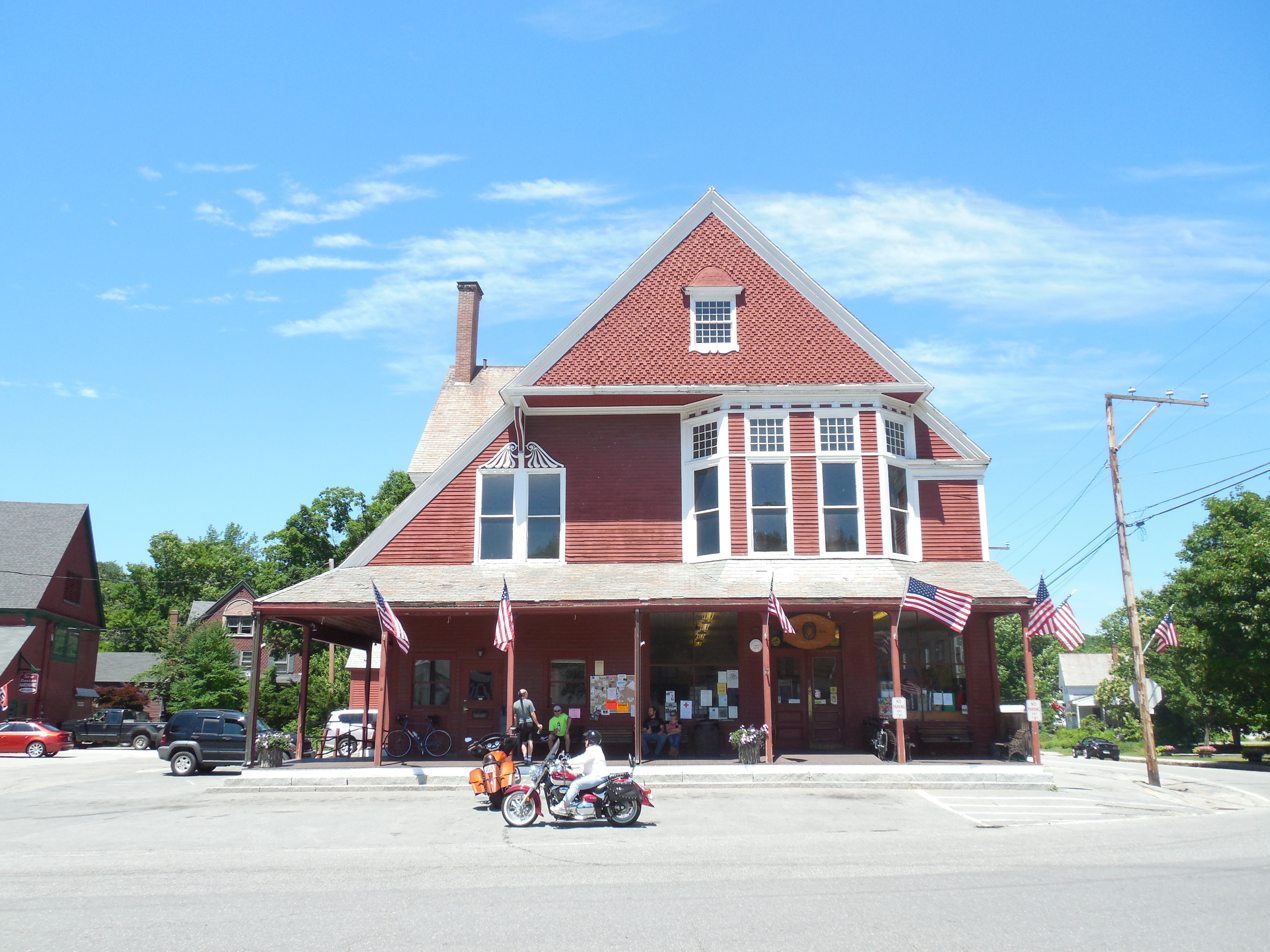
- Dodge's Store

- Location within New Hampshire Location within the United States
- Coordinates: 42°58′33″N 71°41′35″W
- Country: United States
- State: New Hampshire
- County: Hillsborough
- Town: New Boston

Area
  - Total: 0.53 sq mi (1.38 km^{2})
  - Land: 0.52 sq mi (1.34 km^{2})
  - Water: 0.015 sq mi (0.04 km^{2})
- Elevation: 489 ft (149 m)

Population (2020)
  - Total: 326
  - Density: 631.9/sq mi (243.96/km^{2})
- Time zone: UTC-5 (Eastern (EST))
  - Summer (DST): UTC-4 (EDT)
- ZIP code: 03070
- Area code: 603
- FIPS code: 33-50660
- GNIS feature ID: 2806681

New Boston is a census-designated place (CDP) comprising the main village in the town of New Boston, New Hampshire, United States. As of the 2020 census, the population of the CDP was 326, out of 6,108 in the entire town.

== Geography ==
The CDP is in the center of the town of New Boston, on both sides of the South Branch Piscataquog River. The CDP extends west past Briar Hill Road, south down Route 13 to its crossing of the South Branch, east to Molly Stark Lane and Hilldale Lane, and north up Route 136 to Beard Road.

New Hampshire Route 13 passes through the center of the community, leaving to the northeast down the South Branch valley along River Road, and leaving to the south along Mont Vernon Road. Route 13 leads northeast 7 miles (11 km) to Goffstown and south 11 miles (18 km) to Milford. New Hampshire Route 136 has its eastern terminus at Route 13 and leads west 7 miles (11 km) to Francestown, while New Hampshire Route 77 has it southern terminus at the same junction with NH 13 but leads north 9 miles (14 km) to Weare.

According to the U.S. Census Bureau, the New Boston CDP has a total area of 0.54 square miles (1.4 km^{2}), of which 0.02 square miles (0.04 km^{2}), or 3.22%, are water. Via the South Branch of the Piscataquog, New Boston is part of the Merrimack River watershed.

== Demographics ==
Historical population
Census	Pop.	Note	%±
2020	326		—
U.S. Decennial Census

New Boston was first listed as a census designated place in the 2020 U.S. census.
