= New Boston, New Hampshire =

- Town
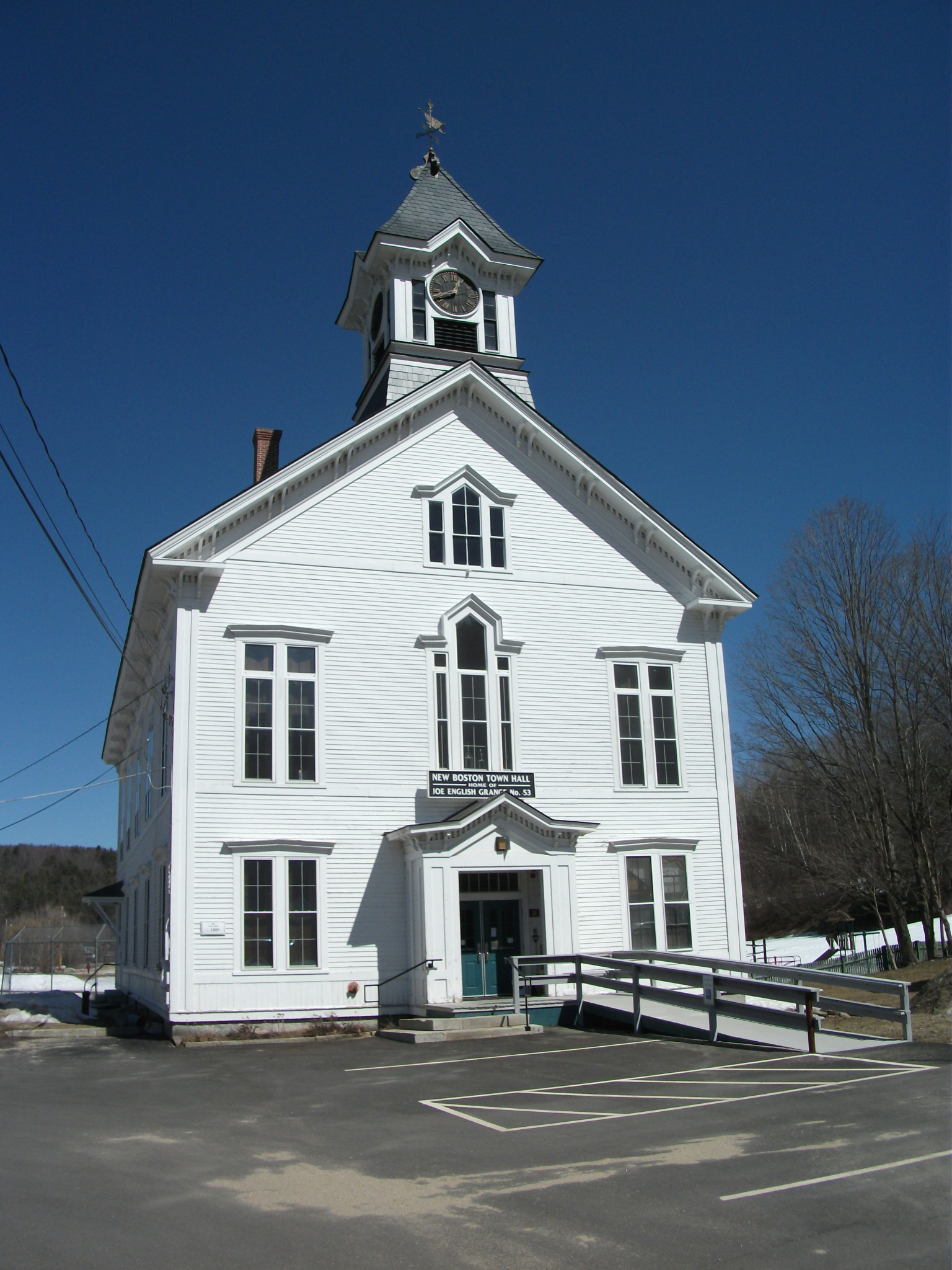
- Town Hall

- Seal
- Nickname: Gravity Center of the World
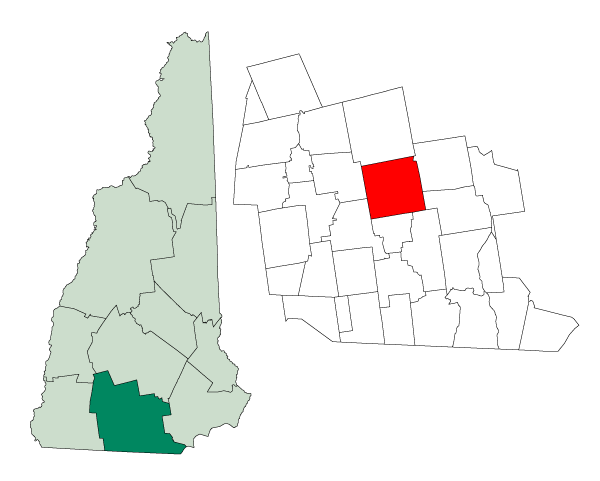
- Location in Hillsborough County, New Hampshire
- Coordinates: 42°58′33″N 71°41′30″W
- Country: United States
- State: New Hampshire
- County: Hillsborough
- Incorporated: 1763

Government
  - Select Board: William McFadden, Chair; Kevin G. Collimore; Jeff Biron
  - Town Administrator: Kathie Vieira

Area
  - Total: 43.2 sq mi (111.9 km^{2})
  - Land: 42.8 sq mi (110.9 km^{2})
  - Water: 0.39 sq mi (1.0 km^{2}) 0.92%
- Elevation: 420 ft (130 m)

Population (2020)
  - Total: 6,108
  - Density: 143/sq mi (55.1/km^{2})
- Time zone: UTC-5 (Eastern)
  - Summer (DST): UTC-4 (Eastern)
- ZIP code: 03070
- Area code: 603
- FIPS code: 33-50740
- GNIS feature ID: 0873674
- Website: www.newbostonnh.gov

New Boston is a town in Hillsborough County, New Hampshire, United States. The population was 6,108 at the 2020 census, up from 5,321 at the 2010 census. New Boston is home to the annual Hillsborough County Agricultural Fair and the Molly Stark Cannon. The 1743 cannon, which appears on the town seal, was given by General John Stark to the New Boston Artillery Company after the Battle of Bennington.

The town's central village is listed as the New Boston census-designated place, with a population in 2020 of 326.

== History ==
The town was first granted in 1736 by colonial governor Jonathan Belcher of Massachusetts and New Hampshire. At the time, lands to the west of the Merrimack River, disputed between the two provinces, were treated by Belcher as part of Massachusetts, and he granted the town to several Boston families. It was to have been called "Lanestown" or "Piscataquog Township", but by 1751 they called it "New Boston" after their hometown. Not all the grantees took up their claims, and the land was regranted 10 years later to settlers from Londonderry, New Hampshire. When the town was incorporated in 1763, Governor Benning Wentworth formally recognized the long-used name of "New Boston".

In 1820, the town had 25 sawmills, six grain mills, two clothing mills, two carding mills, two tanneries and a bark mill. It also had 14 schoolhouses and a tavern. The Great Village Fire of 1887, which started when a spark from a cooper's shop set a barn on fire, destroyed nearly 40 buildings in the lower village. In 1893, the railroad came to New Boston, and farm produce was sent by rail to city markets. Passenger service was discontinued in 1931, and the tracks were removed in 1935. Today the former grade is the multi-use New Boston Rail Trail.

The town is home to the 2,800-acre (1,100 ha) New Boston Space Force Station, which started as an Army Air Corps bombing range in 1942. By 1960, it had become a U.S. Air Force base for tracking military satellites. In July 2021, the facility was given its current name and began operating as part of the United States Space Force. New Boston was also home to the Gravity Research Foundation from the late 1940s through the mid-1960s. Founder Roger Babson placed it in New Boston because he believed it safe from nuclear fallout should New York or Boston be attacked.

Dodge's Store, in the center of town, was established in 1872 and was owned and operated by five generations of the Dodge family until 1994. Clarence H. Dodge started the family business, and ownership remained in the Dodge family until Malcom J. Dodge sold the business in 1994 due to a downturn in the economy. The store closed on August 29, 2011, due to the owner's financial problems, but has since been reopened under new ownership.

== Geography ==
According to the United States Census Bureau, the town has a total area of 43.2 square miles (111.9 km^{2}), of which 42.8 square miles (110.9 km^{2}) are land and 0.39 square miles (1.0 km^{2}) are water, comprising 0.92% of the town. New Boston is drained by the South Branch and Middle Branch of the Piscataquog River, except for the town's southeastern corner, which is drained by Joe English Brook, a tributary of Baboosic Brook. The entire town is part of the Merrimack River watershed. Joe English Hill, elevation 1,285 feet (392 m) above sea level and the highest point in the town, is in the south.

The town is crossed by state routes 13, 77, and 136. The three state highways meet in the center of the town at New Boston village. Klondike Corner is a low-density residential area in the southeastern part of the town.

=== Adjacent municipalities ===
- Weare (north)
- Goffstown (east)
- Bedford (southeast)
- Amherst (southeast)
- Mont Vernon (south)
- Lyndeborough (southwest)
- Francestown (west)

== Demographics ==
Historical population
Census	Pop.	Note	%±
1790	1,202		—
1800	1,491		24.0%
1810	1,619		8.6%
1820	1,686		4.1%
1830	1,680		−0.4%
1840	1,570		−6.5%
1850	1,477		−5.9%
1860	1,369		−7.3%
1870	1,241		−9.3%
1880	1,144		−7.8%
1890	1,067		−6.7%
1900	1,002		−6.1%
1910	982		−2.0%
1920	768		−21.8%
1930	693		−9.8%
1940	773		11.5%
1950	865		11.9%
1960	925		6.9%
1970	1,390		50.3%
1980	1,928		38.7%
1990	3,214		66.7%
2000	4,138		28.7%
2010	5,321		28.6%
2020	6,108		14.8%
2024 (est.)	6,219		1.8%
U.S. Decennial Census

As of the census of 2000, there were 4,138 people, 1,434 households, and 1,162 families residing in the town. The population density was 96.6 inhabitants per square mile (37.3/km^{2}). There were 1,462 housing units at an average density of 34.1 per square mile (13.2/km^{2}). The racial makeup of the town was 98.02% White, 0.36% African American, 0.10% Native American, 0.36% Asian, 0.31% from other races, and 0.85% from two or more races. Hispanic or Latino of any race were 0.63% of the population.

There were 1,434 households, out of which 44.4% had children under the age of 18 living with them, 70.3% were married couples living together, 7.5% had a female householder with no husband present, and 18.9% were non-families. 12.4% of all households were made up of individuals, and 2.6% had someone living alone who was 65 years of age or older. The average household size was 2.88 and the average family size was 3.15.

In the town, the population was spread out, with 30.4% under the age of 18, 4.7% from 18 to 24, 33.5% from 25 to 44, 26.4% from 45 to 64, and 5.0% who were 65 years of age or older. The median age was 36 years. For every 100 females, there were 100.2 males. For every 100 females age 18 and over, there were 99.6 males.

The median income for a household in the town was $66,020, and the median income for a family was $69,458. Males had a median income of $47,173 versus $32,417 for females. The per capita income for the town was $26,488. About 3.1% of families and 4.3% of the population were below the poverty line, including 5.7% of those under age 18 and none of those age 65 or over.

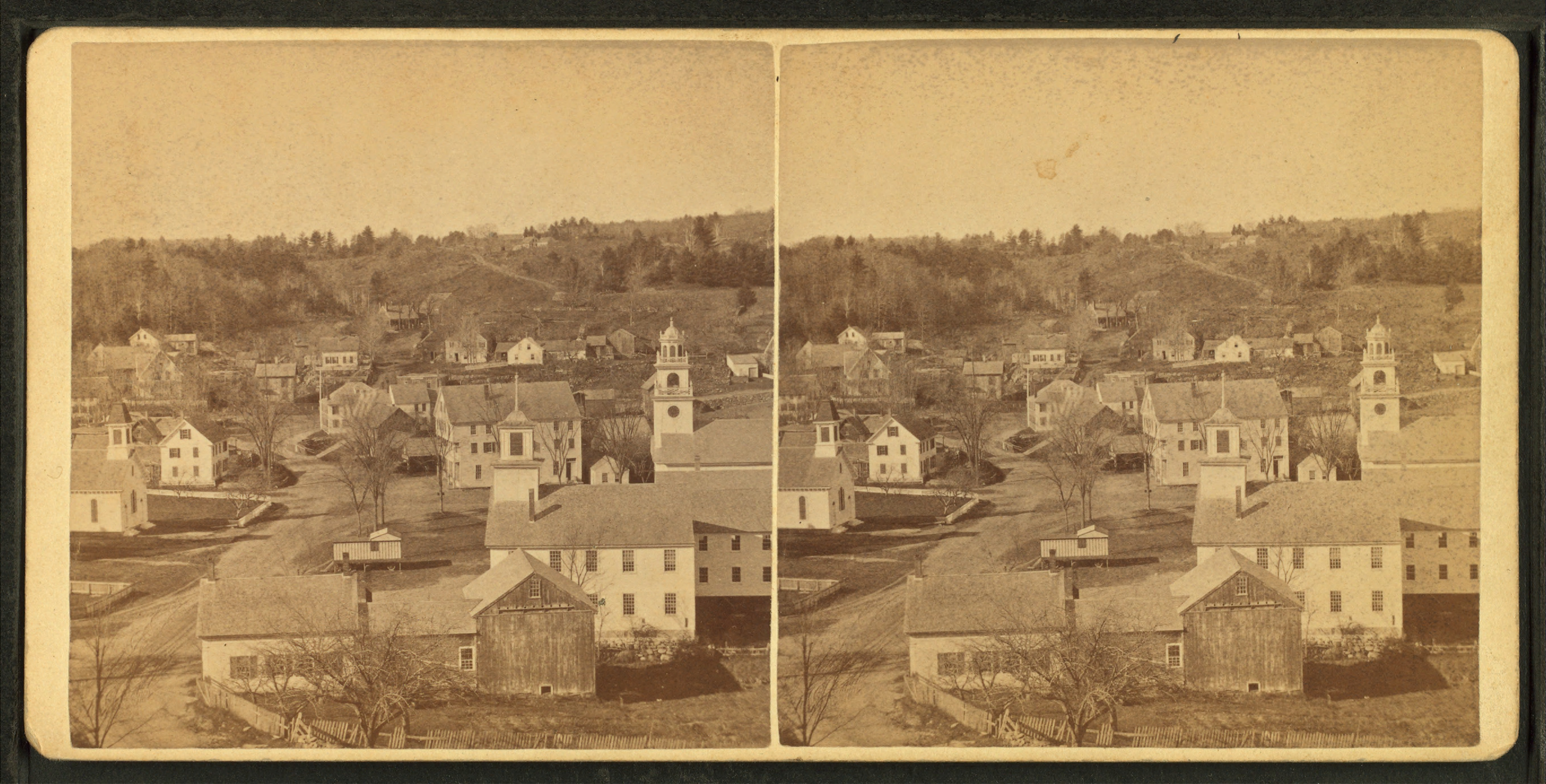
New Boston c. 1875

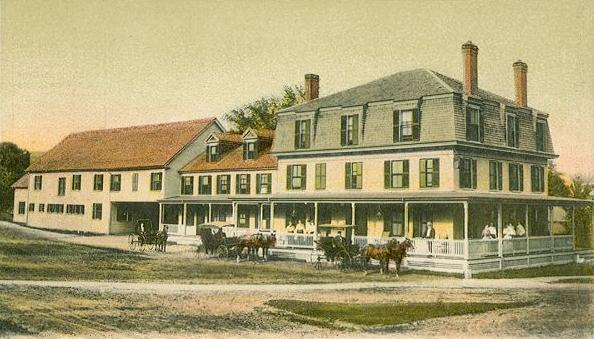
The Tavern c. 1905

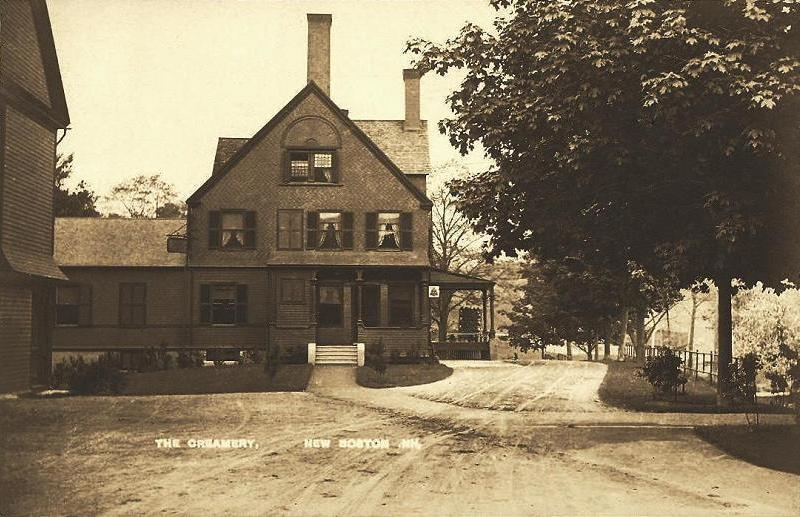
The Creamery c. 1912

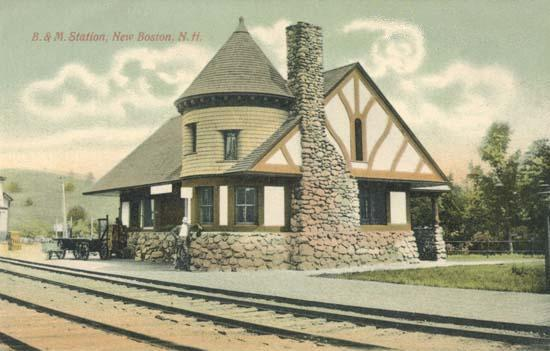
Depot c. 1905

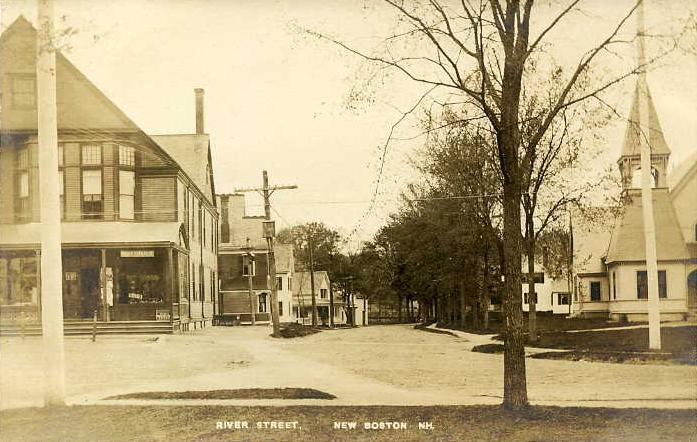
River Road c. 1912

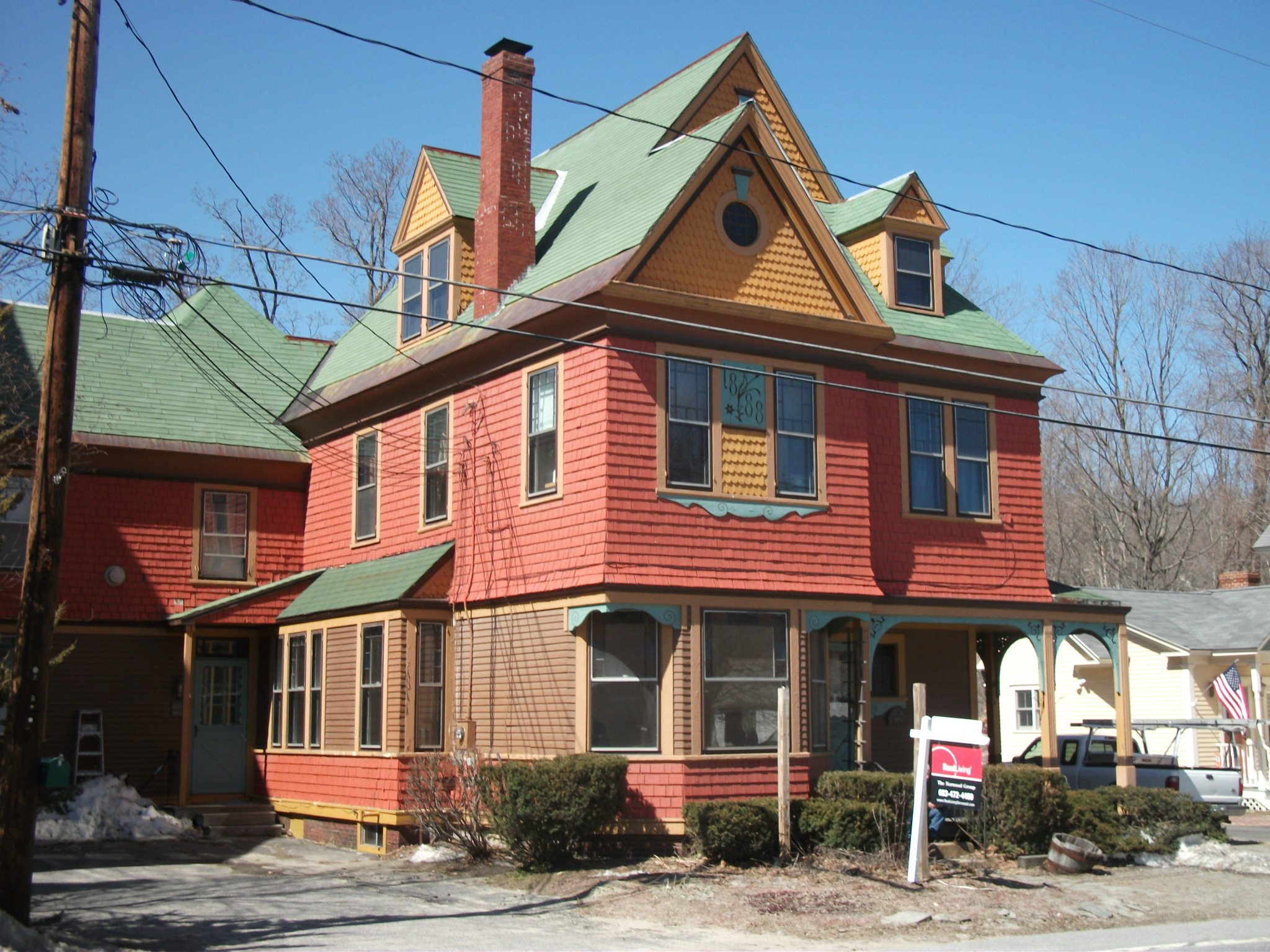
Some Victorian architecture

== Education ==
New Boston is part of School Administrative Unit 19, along with Goffstown. New Boston Central School provides public elementary school through grade six for town residents. Students subsequently attend Mountain View Middle School in Goffstown through eighth grade, followed by Goffstown High School.

== Politics ==
New Boston is part of New Hampshire's 2nd congressional district, represented by Democrat Maggie Goodlander.

New Boston is served by New Hampshire's 9th State Senate District.

== Culture ==
New Boston's fairgrounds are host to several events each year, including the Hillsborough County Fair, which usually takes place in September. The fair helps to preserve the agricultural roots of the area, and families can enjoy rides, exhibits, and the famous tractor pull.

The Fourth of July celebration is one of the larger productions in the area, starting with a parade featuring an assortment of floats created by locals, marching bands, and emergency vehicles, winding through the center of town and ending at the fairgrounds. The annual firing of the Molly Stark cannon also takes place.

== Notable people ==
- Roger Babson (1875–1967), college professor, economist, and entrepreur, headed the Gravity Research Foundation in New Boston from 1948 to 1967.
- William A. Crombie (1844–1914), mayor of Burlington, Vermont
- Horton Foote (1916–2009), playwright, screenwriter
- Dean Potter (1972–2015), rock climber
- Joseph Reed Whipple (1842–1912), Boston hotelier and proprietor of the Valley View Farm in New Boston
