= New Hampshire Route 13 =

North-south state highway in New Hampshire, US

New Hampshire Route 13
- Map of southern New Hampshire with NH 13 highlighted in red

Route information
- Maintained by NHDOT
- Length: 43.368 mi (69.794 km)

Major junctions
- South end: Route 13 in Townsend, MA
- NH 101 in Milford; I-89 in Concord
- North end: US 202 / NH 9 in Concord

Location
- Country: United States
- State: New Hampshire
- Counties: Hillsborough, Merrimack

Highway system
- New Hampshire Highway System; Interstate; US; State; Turnpikes
← NH 12A	→ NH 16

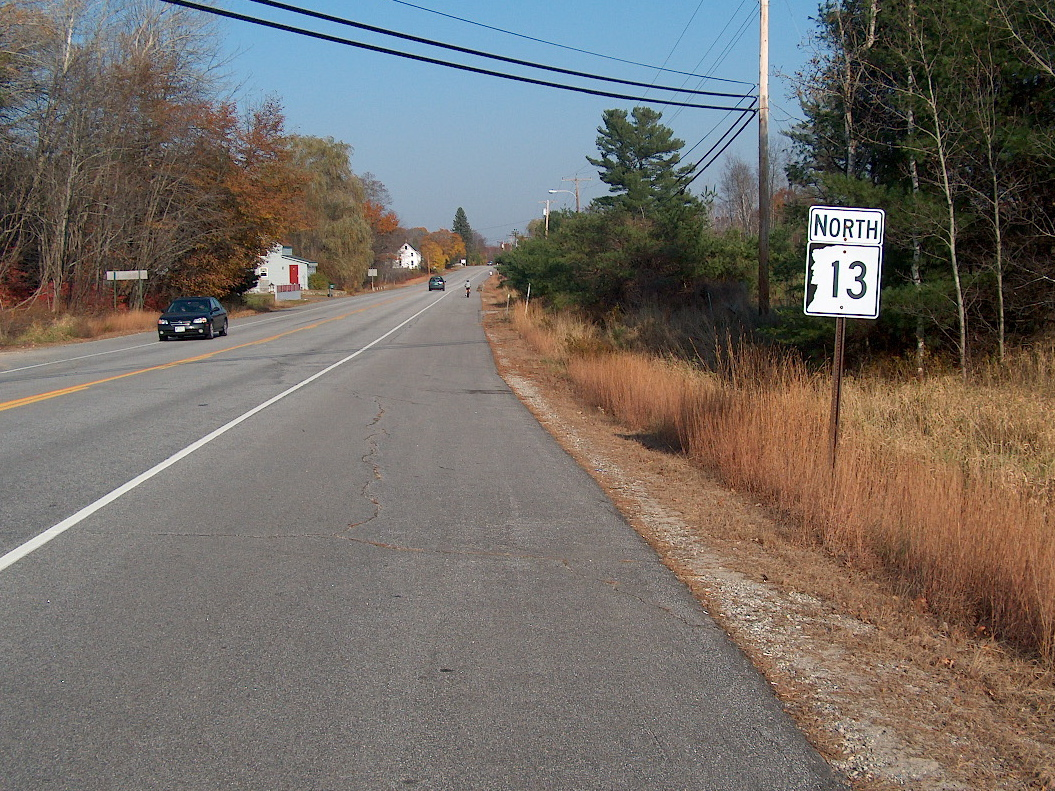
NH 13 northbound entering Concord

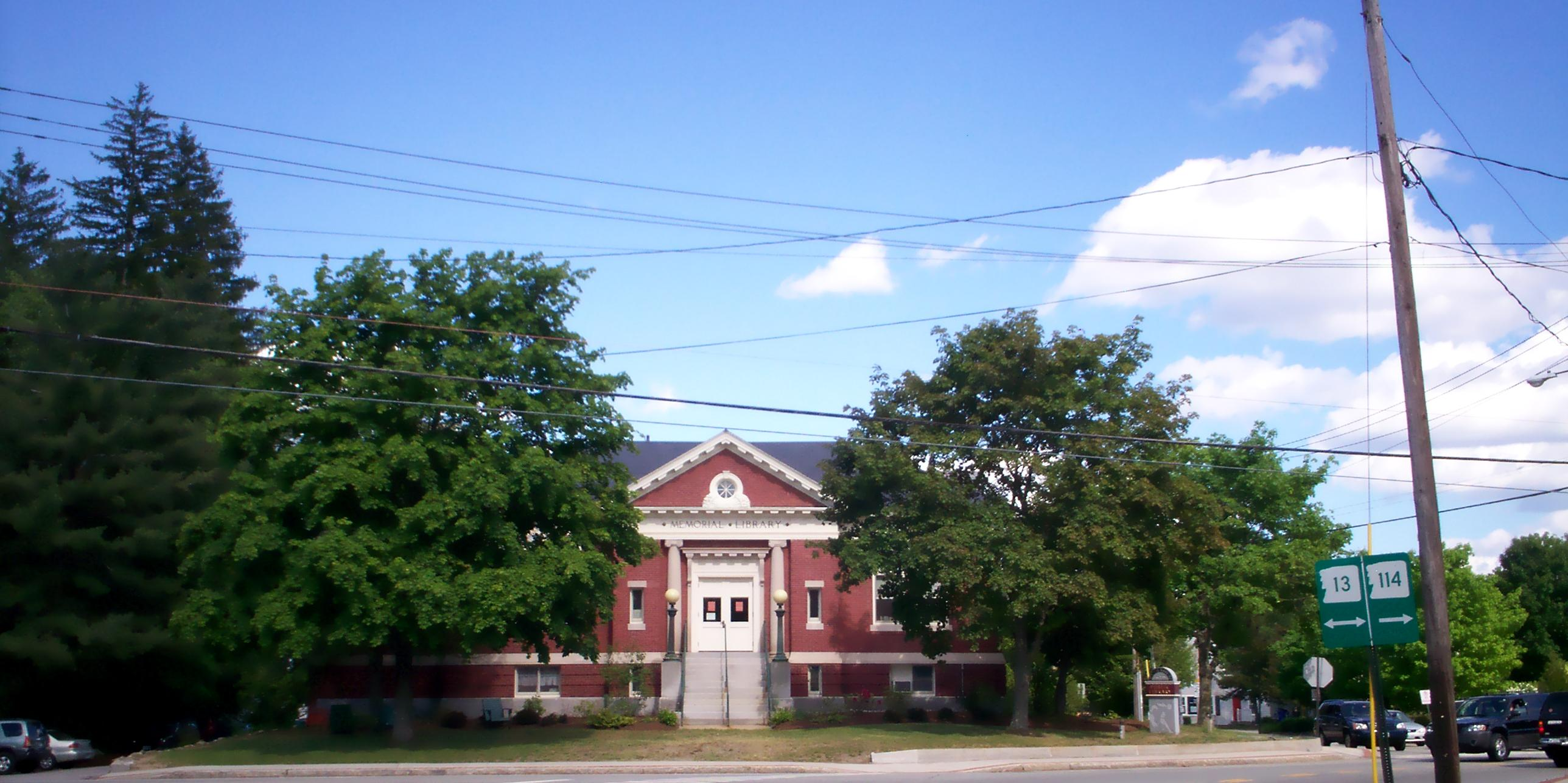
Goffstown Public Library at the junction of NH 13 and NH 114

New Hampshire Route 13 is a 43.38-mile (69.81 km) long north–south state highway in the state of New Hampshire, United States. The highway runs from Brookline to Concord.

The southern terminus is at the Massachusetts state line in Brookline, where the route continues south as Massachusetts Route 13. The northern terminus is in the center of Concord at U.S. Route 202 and New Hampshire Route 9, locally the intersection of South Street and Pleasant Street.

== Route description ==
=== Brookline to Milford ===
NH 13 begins as a continuation of Massachusetts Route 13 at the state line between Brookline and Townsend, Massachusetts. It continues north for about 8.4 miles (13.5 km) through Brookline and crosses into Milford, where it meets an interchange with New Hampshire Route 101. The highway continues north for about 1.4 miles (2.3 km) through the outskirts of Milford's urban center until it reaches Union Square, better known as the Milford Oval, where it intersects New Hampshire Route 101A.

=== Mont Vernon to Goffstown ===
NH 13 continues north over the Souhegan River on the Colonel John Shepard Bridge, then turns northwest for 4.4 miles (7.1 km) towards Mont Vernon and serves as the town's main road. After intersecting the Francestown Turnpike in the center of Mont Vernon, NH 13 continues northwest for about 5.9 miles (9.5 km) until it intersects New Hampshire Route 136 in the center of New Boston. The highway then turns east, crossing the South Branch Piscataquog River, then goes northeast for 6.4 miles (10.3 km) along the path of the river toward Goffstown. It turns north at the intersection of New Hampshire Route 114 with which it briefly runs concurrently over the Piscataquog River and into downtown Goffstown.

=== Dunbarton to Concord ===
After separating from NH 114 at the Goffstown Public Library, NH 13 continues north for 6.1 miles (9.8 km) to the town center of Dunbarton, then for another 3.5 miles (5.6 km) north where it intersects New Hampshire Route 77. After taking a sharp right at the intersection, NH 13 heads northeast towards Concord for 4.0 miles (6.4 km) until it reaches the interchange with Interstate 89 near a New Hampshire State Police barracks. NH 13 then turns north on South Street near downtown Concord, where it meets its northern terminus at US 202/NH 9.

== Junction list ==
County	Location	mi	km	Destinations	Notes
Hillsborough	Brookline	0.000	0.000	Route 13 south (Brookline Street) – Townsend	Continuation from Massachusetts
Hillsborough	Brookline	3.385	5.448	NH 130 (Milford Street) – Brookline, Nashua	Western terminus of NH 130
Hillsborough	Milford	8.391– 8.550	13.504– 13.760	NH 101 – Wilton, Peterborough, Keene, Manchester, Nashua	Interchange
Hillsborough	Milford	9.760	15.707	NH 101A (Elm Street / Nashua Street) – Keene, Nashua	Union Square (the "Milford Oval")
Hillsborough	New Boston	20.572	33.107	NH 77 / NH 136 (High Street) – Weare, Francestown	Eastern terminus of NH 136 & Western terminus of NH 77
Hillsborough	Goffstown	27.135	43.670	NH 114 south (Mast Road) – Manchester	Southern end of concurrency with NH 114
Hillsborough	Goffstown	27.454	44.183	NH 114 north (North Mast Road) – Weare, Henniker	Northern end of concurrency with NH 114
Merrimack	Dunbarton	37.072	59.662	NH 77 (Concord State Road) – Weare	Northern terminus of NH 77
Merrimack	Concord	40.889– 41.172	65.804– 66.260	I-89 to I-93 / NH 3A – Manchester, New London, Lebanon	Exit 2 on I-89
Merrimack	Concord	43.368	69.794	US 202 / NH 9 (Pleasant Street) to US 3	Northern terminus of NH 13
1.000 mi = 1.609 km; 1.000 km = 0.621 mi: Concurrency terminus
