= Goffstown (CDP), New Hampshire =

Census-designated place in New Hampshire, United States

Goffstown, New Hampshire
- Census-designated place
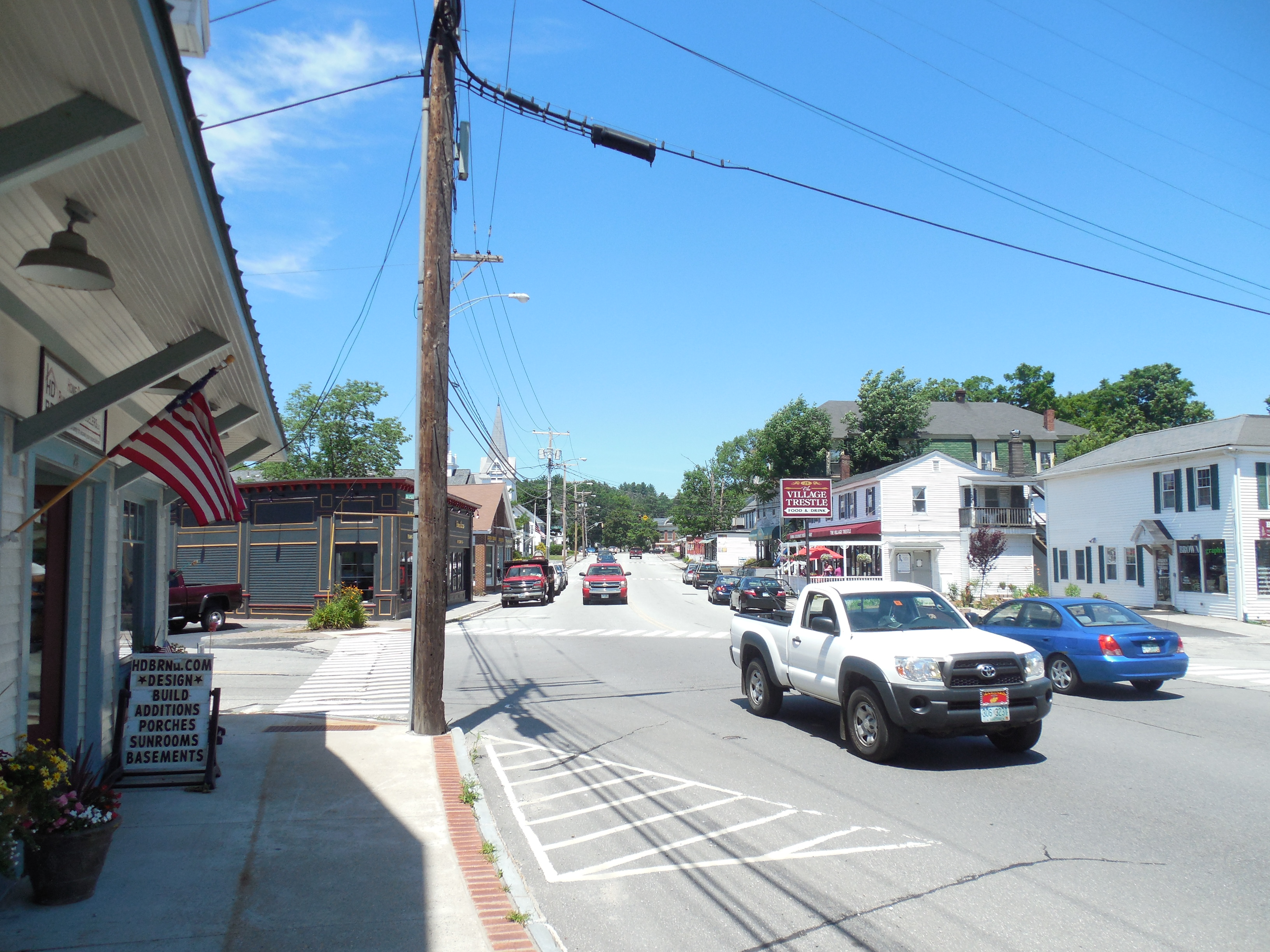
- Main Street

- Location within New Hampshire Location within the United States
- Coordinates: 43°1′13″N 71°36′0″W
- Country: United States
- State: New Hampshire
- County: Hillsborough
- Town: Goffstown

Area
  - Total: 3.40 sq mi (8.81 km^{2})
  - Land: 3.17 sq mi (8.20 km^{2})
  - Water: 0.24 sq mi (0.61 km^{2})
- Elevation: 315 ft (96 m)

Population (2020)
  - Total: 3,366
  - Density: 1,062.9/sq mi (410.37/km^{2})
- Time zone: UTC-5 (Eastern (EST))
  - Summer (DST): UTC-4 (EDT)
- ZIP code: 03045
- Area code: 603
- FIPS code: 33-29780
- GNIS feature ID: 2629722

Goffstown is a census-designated place (CDP) and the main village in the town of Goffstown, New Hampshire, United States. The population of the CDP was 3,366 at the 2020 census, out of 18,577 in the entire town.

== Geography ==
The CDP is in the center of the western part of the town of Goffstown, on both sides of the Piscataquog River. The CDP extends north beyond Parsons Road, 3rd Avenue, Whipple Lane, Smith Road, Hemlock Drive, Heather Hill Road, and Winter Hill Road, and extends east past Paige Hill Road to include all of Upton Lane and all of Glen Lake on the Piscataquog. To the south, the CDP extends beyond Park Lane, Goffstown High School, Ashlar Drive, Westwood Drive, and Janice Drive, and to the west the CDP extends beyond Cushing Road and Parsons Road.

New Hampshire Route 114 passes through the center of the community, leading southeast 7 miles (11 km) to Route 101 in Bedford and northwest 18 miles (29 km) to Henniker. New Hampshire Route 13 also passes through the center, joining Route 114 to cross the Piscataquog, but leading north and east 16 miles (26 km) to Concord and southwest 7 miles (11 km) to New Boston. Downtown Manchester is 8 miles (13 km) to the east via Elm Street and Goffstown Back Road.

According to the U.S. Census Bureau, the Goffstown CDP has a total area of 3.4 square miles (8.8 km^{2}), of which 3.2 square miles (8.2 km^{2}) are land and 0.2 square miles (0.6 km^{2}), or 6.95%, are water.

== Demographics ==
Historical population
Census	Pop.	Note	%±
1950	1,336		—
1960	1,052		−21.3%
1970	2,272		116.0%
2010	3,196		—
2020	3,366		5.3%
U.S. Decennial Census

As of the census of 2010, there were 3,196 people, 1,269 households, and 851 families residing in the CDP. There were 1,339 housing units, of which 70, or 5.2%, were vacant. The racial makeup of the CDP was 97.5% white, 0.3% African American, 0.2% Native American, 0.6% Asian, 0.0% Pacific Islander, 0.2% some other race, and 1.3% from two or more races. 1.6% of the population were Hispanic or Latino of any race.

Of the 1,269 households in the CDP, 32.2% had children under the age of 18 living with them, 53.3% were headed by married couples living together, 9.5% had a female householder with no husband present, and 32.9% were non-families. 26.3% of all households were made up of individuals, and 11.5% were someone living alone who was 65 years of age or older. The average household size was 2.52, and the average family size was 3.04.

23.1% of residents in the CDP were under the age of 18, 7.7% were from age 18 to 24, 24.6% were from 25 to 44, 31.4% were from 45 to 64, and 13.3% were 65 years of age or older. The median age was 41.2 years. For every 100 females, there were 97.6 males. For every 100 females age 18 and over, there were 94.2 males.

For the period 2011–15, the estimated median annual income for a household was $61,690, and the median income for a family was $73,375. Male full-time workers had a median income of $64,489 versus $40,735 for females. The per capita income for the CDP was $35,311. 1.8% of the population and 1.7% of families were below the poverty line, along with 2.7% of people under the age of 18 and 3.4% of people 65 or older.

== Education ==
It is in the Goffstown School District. This district is a part of School Administrative Unit 19.
