= New Hampshire Route 121 =

State highway in southeastern New Hampshire, US

New Hampshire Route 121
- Map of southern New Hampshire with NH 121 highlighted in red

Route information
- Maintained by NHDOT
- Length: 22.555 mi (36.299 km)

Major junctions
- South end: Atkinson Depot Road in Haverhill, MA
- North end: NH 28 Bypass in Manchester

Location
- Country: United States
- State: New Hampshire
- Counties: Rockingham, Hillsborough

Highway system
- New Hampshire Highway System; Interstate; US; State; Turnpikes
← NH 120	→ NH 122

New Hampshire Route 121 (abbreviated NH 121) is a 22.555-mile-long (36.299 km) north–south state highway in Rockingham and Hillsborough counties in southeastern New Hampshire. The road winds through the communities of Atkinson, Hampstead, Sandown, Derry, Chester, and Auburn. The southern terminus of NH 121 is at the Massachusetts state line in Plaistow, where the road, named Atkinson Depot Road, continues into the city of Haverhill as an unnumbered local road (North Main Street) leading to Route 125. The northern terminus is at a traffic circle, where NH 121 meets New Hampshire Route 28 Bypass (the Londonderry Turnpike) in eastern Manchester. At this point, the road is known as Manchester Road.

== Major intersections ==
County	Location	mi	km	Destinations	Notes
Rockingham	Plaistow	0.000	0.000	North Main Street – Haverhill	Massachusetts–New Hampshire line To Route 125
Rockingham	Hampstead	4.969	7.997	NH 111 – Salem, East Hampstead	
Rockingham	Chester	13.392	21.552	NH 121A south (Sandown Road) – Sandown	Northern terminus of NH 121A
Rockingham	Chester	13.609	21.902	NH 102 (Derry Road / Raymond Road) – Derry, Raymond	
Hillsborough	Manchester	22.555	36.299	NH 28 Bypass to NH 101 / I-93 – Candia, Bedford, Hooksett, Derry, Salem	Northern terminus
1.000 mi = 1.609 km; 1.000 km = 0.621 mi

== Suffixed routes ==
New Hampshire Route 121A
- Location: Haverhill, MA–Chester, NH
- Length: 15.144 mi (24.372 km)

New Hampshire Route 121A (abbreviated NH 121A) is a 15.144-mile-long (24.372 km) north–south highway in Rockingham County, New Hampshire. The southern terminus of NH 121A is at the Massachusetts state line in Plaistow, where the road continues for approximately 87 yards (80 m) into Massachusetts before ending at Massachusetts Route 125, a continuation of New Hampshire Route 125 in Haverhill. Upon crossing the border, NH 121A becomes Main Street, reflecting its status as the main street of Plaistow.

The northern terminus of NH 121A is in the town of Chester at New Hampshire Route 121.
