= New Hampshire Route 137 =

State highway in southern New Hampshire, US

New Hampshire Route 137
- Map of southern New Hampshire with NH 137 highlighted in red

Route information
- Maintained by NHDOT
- Length: 16.583 mi (26.688 km)

Major junctions
- South end: US 202 / NH 124 in Jaffrey
- NH 101 in Dublin
- North end: US 202 in Hancock

Location
- Country: United States
- State: New Hampshire
- Counties: Cheshire, Hillsborough

Highway system
- New Hampshire Highway System; Interstate; US; State; Turnpikes
← NH 136	→ NH 140

New Hampshire Route 137 (abbreviated NH 137) is a 16.583-mile-long (26.688 km) secondary north–south state highway in southern New Hampshire. The road runs between Jaffrey and Hancock.

The southern terminus of NH 137 is at U.S. Route 202 and New Hampshire Route 124 in Jaffrey. In Jaffrey, NH 137 is named North Street. The northern terminus is northeast of Hancock center at US 202 along the west side of Powder Mill Pond at the Bennington town line.

== Major intersections ==
County	Location	mi	km	Destinations	Notes
Cheshire	Jaffrey	0.00	0.00	US 202 / NH 124 – Rindge, Peterborough, Marlborough	Southern terminus
Cheshire	Dublin	6.518	10.490	NH 101 – Keene, Peterborough	
Hillsborough	Hancock	13.488	21.707	NH 123 north – Stoddard	Southern end of wrong-way concurrency with NH 123
Hillsborough	Hancock	13.664	21.990	NH 123 south – Peterborough	Northern end of wrong-way concurrency with NH 123
Hillsborough	Hancock	16.583	26.688	US 202 – Bennington, Antrim, Peterborough	Northern terminus
1.000 mi = 1.609 km; 1.000 km = 0.621 mi: Concurrency terminus
