= New Hampshire Route 122 =

State highway in Hillsborough County, New Hampshire, US

New Hampshire Route 122
- Map of Hillsborough County in southern New Hampshire with NH 122 highlighted in red

Route information
- Maintained by NHDOT
- Length: 12.614 mi (20.300 km)

Major junctions
- South end: Massachusetts state line in Hollis
- North end: NH 101 in Amherst

Location
- Country: United States
- State: New Hampshire
- Counties: Hillsborough

Highway system
- New Hampshire Highway System; Interstate; US; State; Turnpikes
← NH 121A	→ NH 123

New Hampshire Route 122 (abbreviated NH 122) is a 12.614-mile-long (20.300 km) north–south highway in Hillsborough County in southeastern New Hampshire, United States. The highway runs from Amherst south to Hollis on the Massachusetts border.

The southern terminus of NH 122 is at the Massachusetts state line in Hollis, where the road continues into Massachusetts as an unnumbered local road in the town of Pepperell. The northern terminus of NH 122 is at an interchange with New Hampshire Route 101 in Amherst.

== Major intersections ==
The entire route is in Hillsborough County.

Location	mi	km	Destinations	Notes
Hollis	0.000	0.000	Hollis Street – Pepperell	Massachusetts–New Hampshire line
Hollis	2.765	4.450	NH 130 (Ash Street / Proctor Hill Road) – Brookline, Nashua	
Amherst	8.870	14.275	NH 101A (Nashua Street) – Milford, Nashua	
Amherst	10.551– 10.648	16.980– 17.136	NH 101 west – Milford	Partial interchange; exit to NH 101 west and entrance from NH 101 east
Amherst	12.614	20.300	NH 101 – Milford, Peterborough, Bedford, Manchester	Interchange; northern terminus
1.000 mi = 1.609 km; 1.000 km = 0.621 mi: Incomplete access
