= New Hampshire Route 45 =

State highway in Hillsborough County, New Hampshire, US

New Hampshire Route 45
- Map of Hillsborough County in southern New Hampshire with NH 45 highlighted in red

Route information
- Maintained by NHDOT
- Length: 5.981 mi (9.625 km)

Major junctions
- South end: NH 123 in Greenville
- North end: NH 101 in Temple

Location
- Country: United States
- State: New Hampshire
- Counties: Hillsborough

Highway system
- New Hampshire Highway System; Interstate; US; State; Turnpikes
← NH 43	→ NH 47

New Hampshire Route 45 is a 5.981-mile-long (9.625 km) north–south state highway in southern New Hampshire. It runs from Greenville to Temple.

== Route description ==
NH 45 begins at NH 123 in Greenville. It runs northwest into the town of New Ipswich for a short distance, then into the town of Temple where it ends at NH 101.

In Temple, the highway is named Senator Tobey Highway. In Greenville, the road starts as Main Street at the center of town. At the north end of town, the road becomes Temple Road then becomes Greenville-Temple Highway farther north. There are various views along the road to the nearby Wapack Range.

== Junction list ==
The entire route is in Hillsborough County.

Location	mi	km	Destinations	Notes
Greenville	0.000	0.000	NH 123 (Main Street / River Street) – New Ipswich, Mason, Fitchburg, MA	Southern terminus
Temple	5.981	9.625	NH 101 (Gibbons Highway) – Peterborough, Keene, Wilton	Northern terminus
1.000 mi = 1.609 km; 1.000 km = 0.621 mi
