= New Hampshire Route 101 =

East-west highway in southern New Hampshire, U.S.

New Hampshire Route 101
- Map of southern New Hampshire with NH 101 highlighted in red

Route information
- Maintained by NHDOT
- Length: 95.189 mi (153.192 km)

Major junctions
- West end: NH 9 / NH 10 / NH 12 in Keene
- US 202 in Peterborough; I-293 / Everett Turnpike / US 3 in Bedford; I-93 in Manchester; NH 125 in Epping; I-95 in Hampton; US 1 in Hampton
- East end: NH 1A in Hampton Beach

Location
- Country: United States
- State: New Hampshire
- Counties: Cheshire, Hillsborough, Rockingham

Highway system
- New Hampshire Highway System; Interstate; US; State; Turnpikes
← NH 97	→ NH 101C
← NH 49	NH 51	→ NH 63
← NH 101D	NH 101E	→ NH 102

New Hampshire Route 101 (NH 101) is a state-maintained highway in southern New Hampshire extending from Keene to Hampton Beach. It is the major east–west highway in the southern portion of the state. Most of its eastern portion is a major freeway linking the greater Manchester area to the Seacoast Region. At 95.189 miles (153.192 km) in length, NH 101 nearly spans the entire width of southern New Hampshire.

The western terminus of NH 101 is in Keene at the junction of NH 9, NH 10, and NH 12. The eastern terminus is in Hampton Beach at the junction with Ocean Boulevard (NH 1A).

Between Exeter and Hampton, NH 101 is known as the Exeter–Hampton Expressway.

There are two current and three former auxiliary routes for NH 101. The current routes are NH 101A, which connects Milford and Nashua, and NH 101E, which parallels the main route in Hampton.

== Route description ==
=== Western segment (Keene to Bedford) ===
The western terminus of NH 101 is in Keene at the main intersection of NH 9, NH 10, and NH 12 anchoring the South Keene retail district. NH 101 begins eastbound cosigned with southbound NH 10 and NH 12. At a traffic circle immediately east of this intersection, NH 10 leaves to the south along Winchester Street, while NH 12 turns south at the next major intersection, Main Street. NH 101 continues east through both of these intersections as Marlboro Street, then leaves Keene at the city's southeast corner for the town of Marlborough. Following Main Street through the main village of Marlborough, NH 101 meets the western terminus of NH 124 in the center of the village and then proceeds east into the town of Dublin. Also known as Main Street in Dublin, NH 101 passes the northern shore of Dublin Pond and the main offices of Yankee Publishing (publishers of Yankee Magazine and the Old Farmer's Almanac) in the central village of Dublin. There is an intersection with NH 137 on the eastern side of Dublin, where NH 101 turns southeast. Entering the town of Peterborough, the road's name changes to Dublin Road, meeting US 202 in the main village of Peterborough for a short concurrency along Wilton Road. At Granite Street, where US 202 leaves to the north, another short concurrency begins with NH 123, which joins NH 101 on Wilton Road. NH 123 leaves southbound on Elm Hill Road, and NH 101 leaves Peterborough at the town's southeastern corner near Miller State Park and Pack Monadnock Mountain, a popular hiking and birdwatching destination. NH 101 next enters the town of Temple, home to Temple Mountain, a former ski resort and current state park. Known locally as Gibbons Highway, NH 101 intersects NH 45 in the northern part of the town and next enters Wilton. Joining NH 31 at the northern bank of the Souhegan River, the two routes cross the river to the south bank before NH 31 leaves to the north in the main village of Wilton, while NH 101 continues eastward along the south bank of the Souhegan River along Gibbons Highway into neighboring Milford, where the name changes to Elm Street. West of the main village of Milford, NH 101 turns southeast onto a two-lane freeway bypass of the central business district while Elm Street continues on as NH 101A. There is an interchange with NH 13 and a second interchange with NH 101A as the freeway turns north into Amherst. The route bypasses to the east of the Amherst Village Historic District, which covers the main village of Amherst, and has two interchanges with NH 122; the southernmost of the two is a half-interchange. Past the northern interchange, the freeway ends and turns northeast.

=== Bedford and Manchester ===
Entering Bedford near the town's southwestern corner, the route crosses the town diagonally to the northeast, and at an intersection with NH 114 turns southeast onto a four-lane divided freeway. Shortly after the beginning of the freeway section is a complex series of interchanges with US 3 (South River Road), Meetinghouse Road, I-293 and the F.E. Everett Turnpike. As NH 101 crosses over the Turnpike, I-293 southbound leaves the Turnpike and joins NH 101 eastbound across the Merrimack River into the city of Manchester. In Manchester, there are interchanges with NH 3A (Brown Avenue) at exit 2 and NH 28 (South Willow Street) at exit 1, both of which provide access to Manchester–Boston Regional Airport, the state's largest. The latter exit also provides access to the Mall of New Hampshire and the large retail district around it. Continuing east, I-293 ends at a Y-interchange with I-93. NH 101 joins I-93 north for a short concurrency, along which there is a single interchange at exit 6 with Candia Road and Hanover Street. At exit 7, NH 101 leaves I-93 and turns back to the east as a four-lane freeway. The sections of NH 101 that are cosigned with I-93 and I-293 are posted with the mile markers and exit numbers of the respective Interstate, and have a posted speed limit of 55 miles per hour (89 km/h).

=== Eastern segment (Manchester to Hampton Beach) ===
After splitting off from I-93, NH 101 is posted with exit numbers beginning sequentially at 1. The westbound exit ramps to I-93 are unnumbered. Between I-93 and exit 1 in Manchester, as well as between I-95 and Landing Road in Hampton, the NH 101 freeway carries a posted speed limit of 55 miles per hour (89 km/h). The remainder of the freeway has a posted speed limit of 65 miles per hour (105 km/h) and a minimum speed requirement of 45 miles per hour (72 km/h).

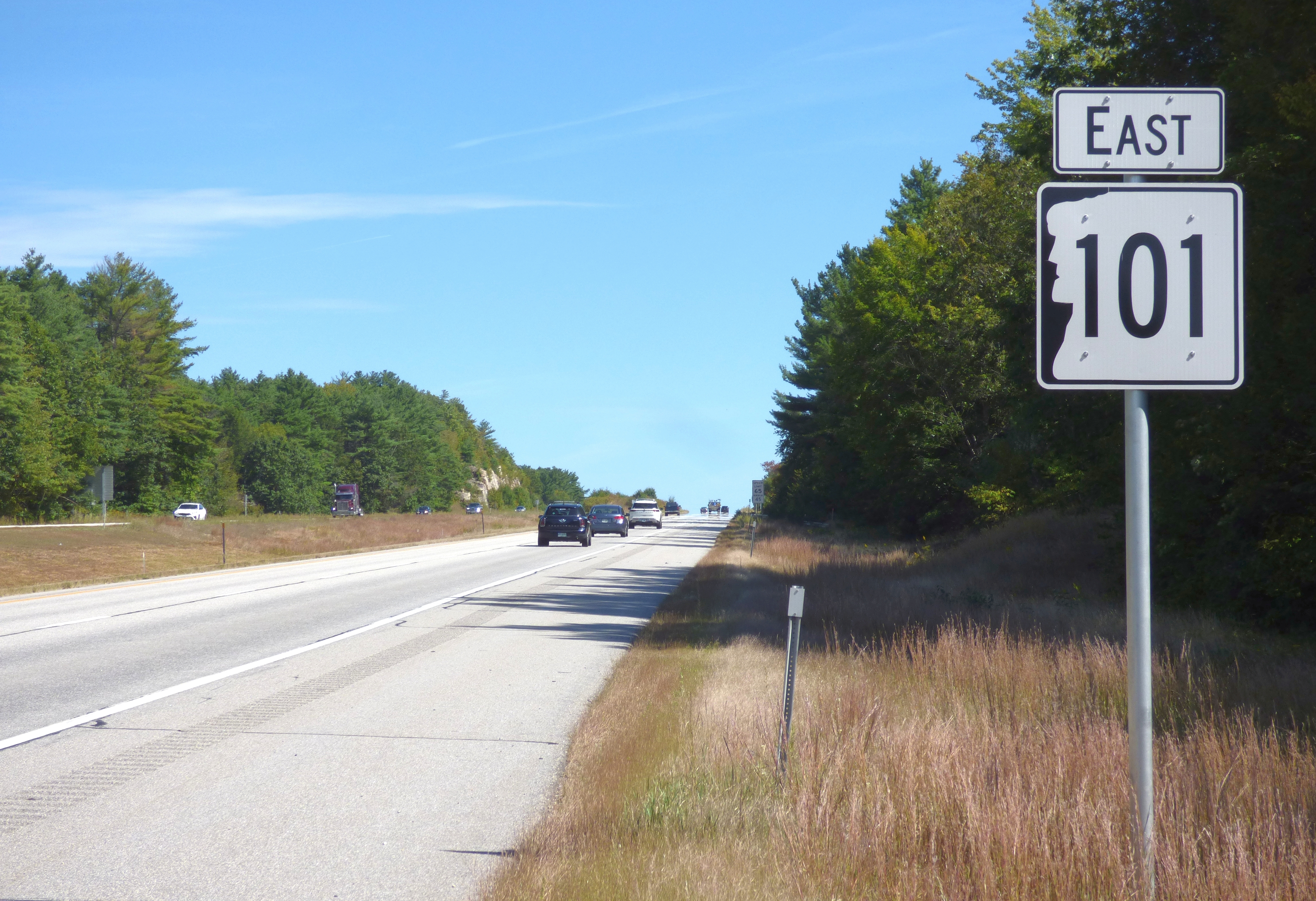
NH Route 101 (eastbound) highway shield in Candia

The NH 101 freeway has one exit in Manchester, exit 1 to NH 28 Bypass (Londonderry Turnpike), after which NH 101 crosses into Auburn, north of Massabesic Lake. In Auburn, exit 2 provides access to Hooksett Road and NH 121. Next the freeway turns northeast into Candia, where there is a trumpet interchange with NH 43 at exit 3. NH 101 continues southeast, then east into Raymond, where exit 4 (Old Manchester Road) provides access to the main village of Raymond and exit 5 provides access to NH 107 (Freetown Road) with nearby connections to NH 27, NH 156 and NH 102. Continuing east into Epping, exit 6 serves Depot Road and Beede Hill Road, and exit 7 provides access NH 125 (Calef Highway). Exit 8 is in Brentwood at North Road, which provides access to the New England Dragway and NH 27. In Exeter, exits 9 (NH 27) and 10 (NH 85) each provide access to the main village and central business district. Exits 11 (NH 108 to NH 33 / NH 88) and exit 12 (NH 111) are located along the Exeter / Stratham town line. Entering the seacoast town of Hampton, NH 101 has an unnumbered and tolled interchange with I-95 and, immediately afterward, exit 13 connects to NH 27. East of exit 13, NH 101 narrows into a super-2 freeway. There is an unnumbered interchange with US 1 (the Hampton Rotary) which provides access to downtown, before the freeway section ends at a traffic light with Landing Road to the east.

NH 101 enters Hampton Beach as a full-access two-lane highway, crosses the marshy estuary system of the Hampton River and its tributaries, then splits into a pair of one-way streets (Highland Avenue eastbound and Church Street westbound) before reaching its eastern terminus at NH 1A (Ocean Boulevard).

== History ==
Most of the eastern section of NH 101 was originally planned as part of the canceled New England East–West Highway from Albany, New York to Portsmouth. Because of the cancellation, NH 101 remained a two-lane freeway until the mid-1990s. This road was colloquially known as the Highway of Death for its numerous accidents and large signs at the start of the two-lane freeway segment between exits 5 and 6 in Raymond that displayed the number of fatalities that had occurred. In the mid-1990s, the two-lane freeway segment was dualized over much of the swampland that it traversed in Rockingham County, creating a full divided controlled-access freeway between Manchester and I-95.

In 1991, an overpass was constructed over North Road in Brentwood near the Rockingham County Jail Farm for the future routing of NH 101. However, the NH 101 expressway was not built in this area until 2000, giving the bridge the nickname the "bridge to nowhere."

Prior to April 2024, the section of NH 101 east of I-93 featured mile markers beginning at Mile 100 and increasing toward Hampton.

Several portions of the highway have been named after prominent figures by the state legislature. According to the state Department of Transportation, the portion from Keene to the Merrimack River was named the Horace Greeley Highway in 1949. The name Robert C. Erler Highway was given to the stretch of highway "from a beginning point at the Auburn-Candia town line to the Raymond-Epping town line" in 1981. Erler was a former Raymond town selectman and state legislator. In 1995, the name Jay McDuffee Highway was given to the stretch "from the Epping/Raymond town line to its terminus in Hampton."

=== New Hampshire Route 51 ===

NH 101 between NH 108 in Stratham, just east of the Exeter town line, to New Hampshire Route 1A in Hampton Beach was opened in 1963 as the Exeter-Hampton Expressway. It was marked with round shields featuring the highway's name and was later designated NH 51 in the 1980s. This designation remained until October 1994. During this time, NH 101 exited the expressway at exit 11 and was cosigned with NH 108 north into Stratham. At the Stratham Traffic Circle, NH 101 split from NH 108 and followed what is now the entirety of NH 33 into downtown Portsmouth, terminating at US 1.

On NH 51, there were two traffic lights located on the limited access two-lane highway: the east-end lights at the terminus of NH 88 southeast of exit 11 and the west-end lights west of the Newfields (then-NH 85) exit with what is now New Hampshire Route 27. While NH 88 was rerouted on a new stretch of road to intersect with NH 108 just south of the NH 101/108 SPUI interchange at exit 11, the Newfields exit was upgraded to a full diamond interchange and became exit 10. NH 27 west of Stratham was formerly NH 101 prior to the completion of the four-lane bypass.

In October 1994, NH 101 was re-routed onto the NH 51 highway between Exeter and Hampton Beach, with the entire expressway becoming NH 101. The existing NH 101 designation was removed from NH 108 between the exit 11 interchange and the Stratham Traffic Circle, and the remaining section of old NH 101 between the Stratham Traffic Circle and downtown Portsmouth became was redesignated as NH 33. The NH 51 designation became redundant and was removed entirely.

== Future ==
NH 101 has long been proposed as a part of the greater East–West Highway, which would provide upgraded freeway connections across the three northern New England states (Maine, New Hampshire and Vermont). Some early proposals suggested that the route should be part of the Interstate Highway System as I-92, but these were rejected. More recent proposals have suggested that the entire route could be part of a privately maintained toll road.

Future Interstate 92
- Location: Albany, NY – Portsmouth, NH or Glens Falls, NY – Calais, ME

Northern New England is served by the following major north–south freeways radiating generally northward from Boston, Massachusetts:

- I-95, which connects metro Boston with coastal New Hampshire, Maine, and ultimately New Brunswick.
  - The Spaulding Turnpike (NH 16), which connects I-95 in Portsmouth, New Hampshire to the White Mountains Region of northern New Hampshire (although the freeway only goes as far north as Milton), and indirectly to the Lakes Region of central New Hampshire (via NH 11).
- I-93, which connects Boston with I-91 in northeastern Vermont via central New Hampshire, including Manchester and Concord.
  - I-89, which connects I-93 in Concord, New Hampshire, to central and northwestern Vermont, including Montpelier and Burlington, and ultimately Quebec. With its southeast-to-northwest orientation, I-89 is the closest thing to an east-west Interstate that exists in northern New England.
- US 3, the Everett Turnpike, and I-293, which connect I-95 in Burlington, Massachusetts to I-93 in Hooksett, New Hampshire.
- I-91, which runs along the Connecticut River, connecting I-90 in western Massachusetts to points in western New Hampshire and eastern Vermont.

However, the northernmost complete east–west freeway within the region, I-90 in Massachusetts, does not enter northern New England. Continuous east–west freeway travel through (and within) northern New England is presently accomplished by three segments, only one of which is truly east–west. The most major east–west highways useful for long-distance travel are as follows:

- Vermont Route 9, NH 9, and Maine State Route 9, which connect Bennington, Vermont (and New York to the west) to as far east as Calais, Maine, although somewhat indirectly in various locations. The road goes through Brattleboro, Vermont, Keene, Concord, Dover, and Somersworth in New Hampshire, and Portland, Augusta, and Bangor in Maine (although I-95 is a faster option between Portland and Bangor).
- US 4, which connects Fair Haven, Vermont (and New York to the west) to Portsmouth, New Hampshire.
- US 2, which connects Burlington, Vermont to Houlton, Maine (via Montpelier and Bangor).
- US 302, which connects Montpelier, Vermont to Portland, Maine. US 202 offers an alternative routing between Windham, Maine and Bangor.

== Major intersections ==
County	Location	mi	km	Exit	Destinations	Notes
Cheshire	Keene	0.000	0.000		NH 9 / NH 10 north / NH 12 north (Franklin Pierce Highway) – Brattleboro VT, Concord, Walpole	Western terminus; western end of NH 10/NH 12 concurrency
Cheshire	Keene	0.459	0.739		NH 10 south (Winchester Street) – Winchester	Eastern end of NH 10 concurrency
Cheshire	Keene	1.240	1.996		NH 12 south (Main Street / Lower Main Street) – Troy	Eastern end of NH 12 concurrency
Cheshire	Marlborough	5.362	8.629		NH 124 east (Jaffrey Road) – Jaffrey	Western terminus of NH 124
Cheshire	Dublin	15.626	25.148		NH 137 (Brush Brook Road) – Hancock, Jaffrey	
Hillsborough	Peterborough	20.094	32.338		US 202 west (Grove Street) – Jaffrey	Western end of US 202 concurrency
Hillsborough	Peterborough	20.290	32.654		US 202 east / NH 123 north (Granite Street) – Hancock, Concord	Eastern end of US 202 concurrency; western end of NH 123 concurrency
Hillsborough	Peterborough	21.154	34.044		NH 123 south (Elm Hill Road) – Sharon, New Ipswich	Eastern end of NH 123 concurrency
Hillsborough	Temple	25.812	41.540		NH 45 south (Senator Tobey Highway) – Temple, Greenville	Northern terminus of NH 45
Hillsborough	Wilton	30.743	49.476		NH 31 south (Greenville Road) – Greenville, Mason, New Ipswich	Western end of NH 31 concurrency
Hillsborough	Wilton	32.737	52.685		NH 31 north (Island Street) – Wilton, Greenfield	Eastern end of NH 31 concurrency
Hillsborough	Milford	34.794	55.996		NH 101A east (Elm Street) – Milford	Western terminus of NH 101A
Hillsborough	Milford	38.349	61.717		NH 13 (South Street) – Milford, Brookline	Interchange
Hillsborough	Milford	39.997	64.369		NH 101A (Nashua Street) – Milford, Nashua	Interchange
Hillsborough	Amherst	41.110	66.160		NH 122 (Ponemah Road)	Interchange; eastbound exit and westbound entrance
Hillsborough	Amherst	42.974	69.160		NH 122 (Baboosic Lake Road) – Amherst	Interchange
Hillsborough	Bedford	52.419	84.360		NH 114 north / Boynton Street – Goffstown	At-grade intersection; western terminus of freeway; southern terminus of NH 114
Hillsborough	Bedford			–	Kilton Road to US 3 (South River Road)	Westbound exit and entrance
Hillsborough	Bedford			–	US 3 (South River Road) / Meetinghouse Road	Eastbound exit and entrance
Hillsborough	Bedford	54.119	87.096	3	I-293 north / Everett Turnpike – Merrimack, Nashua, Manchester, Concord	Western end of I-293 concurrency; exit number not signed
Hillsborough	Manchester	55.160	88.771	2	NH 3A (Brown Avenue) – Litchfield	
Hillsborough	Manchester	55.787	89.780	1	NH 28 (South Willow Street) – Mall of New Hampshire	
Hillsborough	Manchester	57.972	93.297	–	I-93 south – Boston I-293 ends	Western end of I-93 concurrency; southern terminus of I-293
Hillsborough	Manchester	58.900	94.790	6	Candia Road / Hanover Street	
Hillsborough	Manchester	59.275	95.394	7	I-93 north – Concord	Eastern end of I-93 concurrency; exit number not signed westbound
Hillsborough	Manchester	60.994	98.160	1	NH 28 Bypass (Londonderry Turnpike) to I-93 – Auburn, Hooksett	
Rockingham	Auburn	62.521	100.618	2	To NH 121 / Hooksett Road – Auburn, Candia	
Rockingham	Candia	65.980	106.185	3	NH 43 north (Old Candia Road) – Candia, Deerfield	Trumpet interchange; southern terminus of NH 43
Rockingham	Raymond	71.979	115.839	4	Old Manchester Road – Raymond	Signs stating "Local Traffic Only" removed in 2015; Raymond not signed going eastbound
Rockingham	Raymond	73.875	118.890	5	NH 107 (Freetown Road) to NH 102 / NH 156 – Raymond, Fremont	
Rockingham	Epping	76.021	122.344	6	Depot Road / Beede Hill Road	
Rockingham	Epping	78.288	125.992	7	NH 125 (Calef Highway) – Epping, Kingston	
Rockingham	Brentwood	80.479	129.518	8	To NH 27 (North Road)	Formerly known as the Bridge to Nowhere
Rockingham	Exeter	83.586	134.519	9	NH 27 (Epping Road) – Exeter	
Rockingham	Exeter	85.101	136.957	10	NH 85 (Newfields Road) – Exeter, Newfields	
Rockingham	Stratham	86.236	138.783	11	NH 108 (Portsmouth Avenue) to NH 33 / NH 88 – Stratham, Exeter	
Rockingham	Exeter	88.942	143.138	12	NH 111 (North Hampton Road) – Exeter, North Hampton	
Rockingham	Hampton	90.566	145.752	–	I-95 – Portsmouth, Boston	Trumpet interchange; exit 2 on I-95; Hampton Side Toll Plaza
Rockingham	Hampton	91.276	146.894	13	NH 27 (Exeter Road) – Hampton	Roadway narrows to a two-lane undivided freeway east of this interchange
Rockingham	Hampton	92.884	149.482	–	US 1 (Lafayette Road) – Hampton, Seabrook	
Rockingham	Hampton	93.731	150.845	Eastern terminus of freeway		
Rockingham	Hampton	95.189	153.192		NH 1A (Ocean Boulevard) – Hampton Beach	
1.000 mi = 1.609 km; 1.000 km = 0.621 mi: Concurrency terminus; Incomplete access; Tolled; Route transition

== Suffixed routes ==
=== New Hampshire Route 101A ===
New Hampshire Route 101A
- Location: Milford–Nashua
- Length: 13.819 mi (22.240 km)

New Hampshire Route 101A (abbreviated NH 101A) is a 13.819-mile-long (22.240 km) east–west highway in Hillsborough County, New Hampshire, connecting Milford and Nashua. It also runs through Merrimack and Amherst and very briefly touches Hollis.

The western terminus of NH 101A is in western Milford at the intersection with NH 101. The eastern terminus is in the center of Nashua, when it meets New Hampshire Route 111 at the Merrimack River. Most of it is two lanes in each direction, sometimes with a central turning lane.

Route 101A is quite busy by southern New Hampshire standards, with traffic ranging from 26,000 vehicles per weekday in Nashua to 9,000 in western Milford.

The road carries a number of names. In Milford it is Elm Street and then Nashua Street; in Amherst and Merrimack it is the Milford Road or, more commonly, just 101A; in Nashua it is Amherst Street. There is some confusion over the eastern terminus; Google Maps shows the route continuing to the Taylor Falls Bridge and ending at the bridge, while the official New Hampshire route map shows the route ending at the eastern terminus of Amherst Street, where it meets Main Street and Concord Street. Local signage also stops at the end of Amherst Street.

=== New Hampshire Route 101B ===
New Hampshire Route 101B was a designation once held by two separate state highways in New Hampshire. Although the two segments did not directly connect, they were linked at the time by their parent route, New Hampshire Route 101.

==== Western segment ====
New Hampshire Route 101B
- Location: Hooksett–Candia

The western segment of NH 101B was a roughly 8.5-mile-long (13.7 km) east–west road in the Manchester area. The western terminus of the route was at U.S. Route 3 and New Hampshire Route 28 in Hooksett, the current western terminus of New Hampshire Route 27. The eastern terminus was at NH 101 near Candia.

All of the western segment of NH 101B was renumbered NH 27 at an unknown time.

==== Eastern segment ====
New Hampshire Route 101B
- Location: Portsmouth

The eastern segment of NH 101B was a short east–west road in downtown Portsmouth. The western terminus was at the intersection of Islington Street and Middle Road, where NH 101, which followed the present alignment of New Hampshire Route 33 into Portsmouth, departed the routing of NH 33 and followed Islington Street to U.S. Route 1. NH 101B continued east on Middle Road and South Street, following the modern alignment of NH 33 to the present eastern terminus of NH 33 at US 1. At US 1, NH 101B continued east on South Street, running along the local street to its eastern terminus at New Hampshire Route 1B.

Prior to 1971, NH 101B from Islington Street east to US 1 became NH 101 while Islington Street and the portion of NH101B east of US 1 reverted to city maintenance. This section of NH 101 was renumbered to NH 33 in 1994.

=== New Hampshire Route 101C ===
New Hampshire Route 101C
- Location: Hampton Beach

New Hampshire Route 101C ran from NH 108 east along what is now NH 27 to NH 1A in Hampton Beach.

=== New Hampshire Route 101D ===
New Hampshire Route 101D
- Location: Hampton–Hampton Beach

The portion of NH 111 between New Hampshire Route 27 in Hampton and NH 1A in Hampton Beach was once designated New Hampshire Route 101D.

=== New Hampshire Route 101E ===
New Hampshire Route 101E
- Location: Hampton
- Length: 2.357 mi (3.793 km)

New Hampshire Route 101E is a short stretch of urban road 2.357 miles (3.793 km) in length in Hampton. This road connects Lafayette Road (U.S. Route 1) with Ocean Boulevard (New Hampshire Route 1A). NH 101E is locally named Winnacunnet Road. Despite its name, this highway has never connected with NH 101 or any of its spurs. The entire route is maintained by the town of Hampton.

Guide signs exist at the eastern terminus at NH 1A, but along the road itself, there is no signage to indicate the route's number. It is not known as Route 101E to local residents, who call it Winnacunnet Road.
