= New Hampshire Route 123 =

State highway in southwestern New Hampshire, US

Route 123
- Map of southern New Hampshire with NH 123 highlighted in red

Route information
- Maintained by NHDOT
- Length: 63.055 mi (101.477 km)

Major junctions
- South end: Mason Road in Townsend, MA
- NH 31 in Greenville; US 202 / NH 101 in Peterborough; NH 9 in Stoddard; NH 10 in Marlow; NH 12 in Walpole
- North end: VT 123 near Walpole

Location
- Country: United States
- State: New Hampshire
- Counties: Hillsborough, Cheshire, Sullivan

Highway system
- New Hampshire Highway System; Interstate; US; State; Turnpikes
← NH 122	→ NH 124
← VT 122	VT	→ VT 125

New Hampshire Route 123 (abbreviated NH 123) is a 63.055-mile-long (101.477 km) secondary north–south state highway in southwestern New Hampshire. The southern terminus of the route is at the Massachusetts state line in Mason where, as Mason Road, the road continues as an unnumbered local road in the town of Townsend. The northern terminus, as signed, is at the Connecticut River, where the highway continues west for 0.313 miles (0.504 km) to U.S. Route 5 in Westminster, Vermont, as Vermont Route 123 (VT 123). Route logs, however, place the terminus at New Hampshire Route 12 in Walpole.

In Walpole, NH 123 runs in a wrong-way concurrency with NH 12 north–south alongside the Connecticut River, the water body that represents the border between New Hampshire and Vermont. For the entire length of the NH 12/NH 123 concurrency, NH 123 South is, in reality, heading north on the compass while NH 123 North is traveling to the south.

== History ==
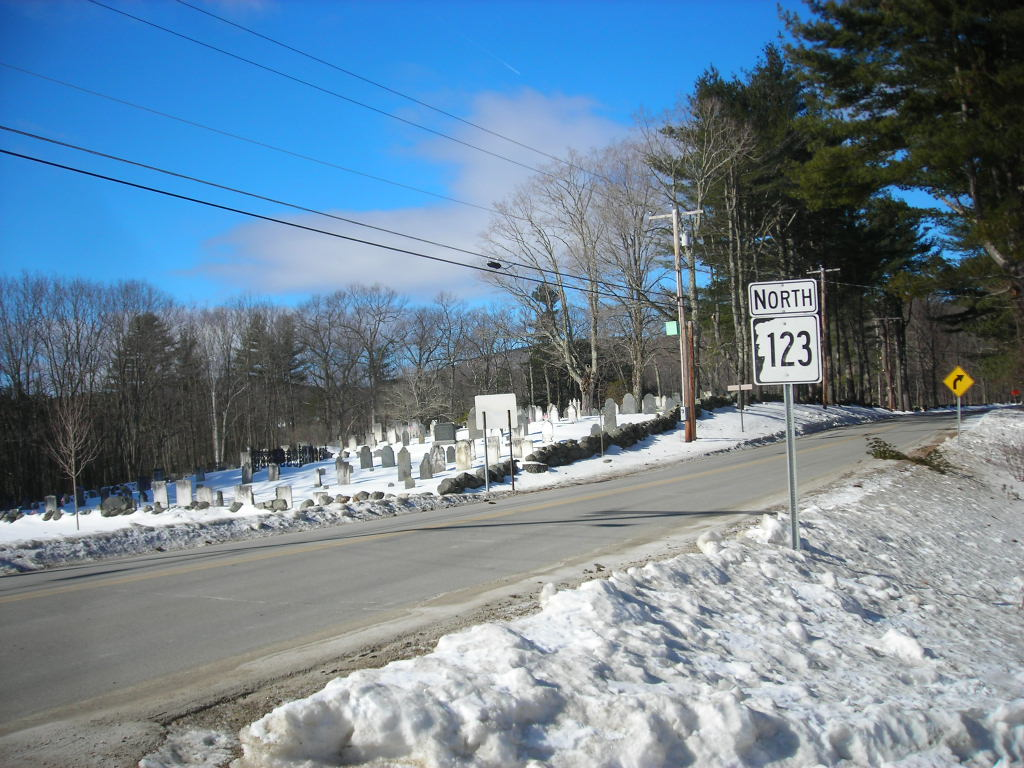
NH Route 123 heading northbound

In October 2005, heavy flooding in the New Hampshire area forced the closure of NH 123 in two different locations. The first was at the intersection of NH 123 and Cold River Road near Drewsville, where a bridge was destroyed from high water in the Cold River, approximately 5 miles (8 km) east of North Walpole. The second closure was approximately 3 miles (5 km) south of the junction with New Hampshire Route 123A in the town of Alstead, where a section of roadway was completely washed away by the water. Both sections were subsequently rebuilt and reopened.

== Major intersections ==
County	Location	mi	km	Destinations	Notes
Hillsborough	Mason	0.000	0.000	Mason Road – Townsend	Massachusetts–New Hampshire line To Route 119
Hillsborough	Greenville	5.171	8.322	NH 31 south (Fitchburg Road) – Fitchburg, MA	Southern end of concurrency with NH 31
Hillsborough	Greenville	5.439	8.753	NH 31 north (Fitchburg Road) – Wilton	Northern end of NH 31/123 concurrency
Hillsborough	Greenville	6.321	10.173	NH 45 north (Main Street) – Temple	Southern terminus of NH 45
Hillsborough	New Ipswich	7.922	12.749	NH 124 east (Turnpike Road) – Townsend, MA	Southern end of concurrency with NH 124
Hillsborough	New Ipswich	9.440	15.192	NH 123A south (Main Street) – Ashby, MA	Northern terminus of NH 123A (southern segment)
Hillsborough	New Ipswich	12.829	20.646	NH 124 west (Turnpike Road) – Jaffrey	Northern end of concurrency with NH 124
Hillsborough	Peterborough	18.971	30.531	NH 101 east (Wilton Road) – Wilton	Southern end of concurrency with NH 101
Hillsborough	Peterborough	19.835	31.921	US 202 west / NH 101 west (Wilton Road) – Keene	Northern end of concurrency with NH 101; southern end of concurrency with US 202
Hillsborough	Peterborough	22.130	35.615	NH 136 east (Greenfield Road) – Greenfield	Western terminus of NH 136
Hillsborough	Hancock	25.553	41.124	US 202 east (Concord Street) – Bennington, Antrim	Northern end of concurrency with US 202
Hillsborough	Hancock	28.099	45.221	NH 137 north (Bennington Road) – Bennington, Antrim	Southern end of wrong-way concurrency with NH 137
Hillsborough	Hancock	28.274	45.503	NH 137 south (Old Hancock Road) – Dublin, Jaffrey	Northern end of wrong-way concurrency with NH 137
Cheshire	Stoddard	35.287	56.789	NH 9 west (Franklin Pierce Highway) – Keene	Southern end of concurrency with NH 9
Cheshire	Stoddard	36.407	58.591	NH 9 east (Franklin Pierce Highway) – Hillsborough, Concord	Northern end of concurrency with NH 9
Cheshire	Marlow	44.259	71.228	NH 10 south (Gilsum Road) – Gilsum	Southern end of concurrency with NH 10
Cheshire	Marlow	45.273	72.860	NH 10 north – Newport	Northern end of concurrency with NH 10
Cheshire	Alstead	53.979	86.871	NH 12A south (Alstead Center Road) – Surry	Southern end of concurrency with NH 12A
Cheshire	Alstead	54.777	88.155	NH 123A east (Acworth Road) – Acworth	Western terminus of NH 123A (northern segment)
Cheshire	Alstead	55.438	89.219	NH 12A north (High Street) – Langdon, Charlestown	Northern end of concurrency with NH 12A
Sullivan	No major junctions				
Cheshire	Walpole	60.218	96.911	NH 12 north – North Walpole, Bellows Falls, VT	Southern end of wrong-way concurrency NH 12
Cheshire	Walpole	62.943	101.297	NH 12 south (Bellows Falls Road) – Westmoreland, Keene	Northern end of wrong-way concurrency with NH 12
Connecticut River		63.055 0.000	101.477 0.000	New Hampshire–Vermont state line	
Windham	Westminster	0.313	0.504	US 5 to I-91 – Bellows Falls, Brattleboro	Western terminus of VT 123
1.000 mi = 1.609 km; 1.000 km = 0.621 mi: Concurrency terminus

== New Hampshire Route 123A ==
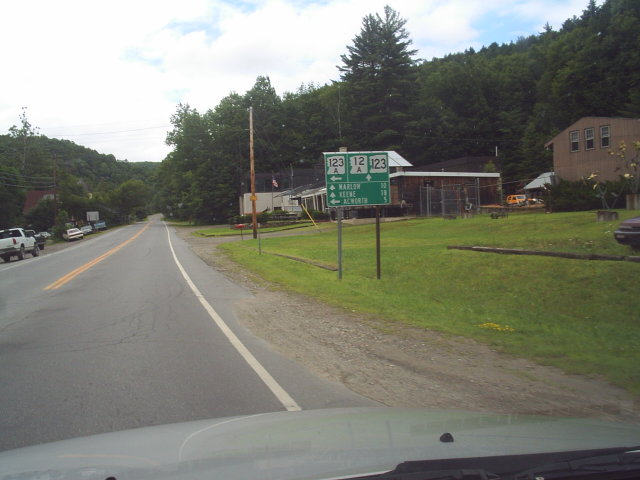
Signage near the western end of NH Route 123A's northern segment, as viewed from NH Routes 12A/123

New Hampshire Route 123A (abbreviated NH 123A) is a designation held by two separate state highways in New Hampshire, United States. Although the two segments are not directly connected, they are linked by their parent route, New Hampshire Route 123.

=== Southern segment ===
New Hampshire Route 123A
- Location: New Ipswich
- Length: 4.216 mi (6.785 km)

The southern segment of NH 123A is a 4.216-mile-long (6.785 km) secondary rural road that runs from the town of New Ipswich to the Massachusetts border.

The southern terminus of this segment is at the Massachusetts state line in New Ipswich. At this location, the road is locally named Ashburnham Road. The road continues into Massachusetts and becomes West Road in the town of Ashby. The northern terminus is at NH 123 and New Hampshire Route 124 in New Ipswich. At this location, NH 123A is locally named Main Street.

=== Northern segment ===
New Hampshire Route 123A
- Location: Alstead–Marlow
- Length: 10.070 mi (16.206 km)

The northern segment of NH 123A is a 10.070-mile-long (16.206 km) secondary rural east–west highway in western New Hampshire, running between the towns of Alstead and Marlow. The eastern terminus of this segment of NH 123A is at New Hampshire Route 10 in Marlow. The western terminus is at NH 123 in Alstead. The road is the only numbered state highway in the town of Acworth, and is the main road through the village of South Acworth.
