= List of state routes in New Hampshire =

New Hampshire Highway System
- ; Standard highway markers for longest New Hampshire Routes

Highway names
- Interstates: Interstate X (I-X)
- US Highways: U.S. Route n (US X or Route X)
- State: New Hampshire Route X (NH X or Route X)

System links
- New Hampshire Highway System; Interstate; US; State; Turnpikes

The following is a list of state routes in the U.S. state of New Hampshire. All routes in the state are maintained by the New Hampshire Department of Transportation. New Hampshire route markers feature the profile of the Old Man of the Mountain.

== Primary routes ==
| Number | Length (mi) | Length (km) | Southern or western terminus | Northern or eastern terminus | Formed | Removed | Notes |
|---|---|---|---|---|---|---|---|
| NH 4 | 3.807 | 6.127 | NH 9 / NH 108 in Dover | SR 4 in South Berwick, ME | — | — | Unrelated to US 4, which also runs through Dover |
| NH 9 | 109.910 | 176.883 | VT 9 in Brattleboro, VT | SR 9 in Berwick, ME | 1925 | current | Mostly follows the old New England Route 9 |
| NH 10 | 122.476 | 197.106 | MA 10 in Northfield, MA | US 302 in Haverhill | 1922 | current | Mostly follows the old New England Route 10; Signed along US 302 from Haverhill to Littleton, but not part of official route |
| NH 11 | 108.223 | 174.168 | VT 11 in Springfield, VT | US 202 / SR 11 in Lebanon, ME | — | — | Mostly follows the old New England Route 11 |
| NH 12 | 62.773 | 101.023 | MA 12 in Winchendon, MA | VT 12 in Ascutney, VT | — | — | Mostly follows the old New England Route 12 |
| NH 13 | 43.368 | 69.794 | MA 13 in Townsend, MA | US 202 / NH 9 in Concord | — | — | |
| NH 16 | 154.771 | 249.080 | I-95 / US 1 Byp. / US 4 in Portsmouth | SR 16 in Magalloway, ME | 1926 | current | Mostly follows the old New England Route 16; Southernmost 33.259 miles (53.525 km) concurrent with Spaulding Turnpike |
| NH 17 | 0.2 | 0.32 | MA 17 (now US 1) in Salisbury, MA | US 1 in Seabrook | 1953 | 1959 | Section of US 1 was designated MA 17/NH 17 during construction of I-95 |
| NH 18 | 20.116 | 32.374 | I-93 / US 3 in Franconia | VT 18 in Waterford, VT | 1922 | current | Mostly follows the old New England Route 18 that did not become US 302 |
| NH 25 | 96.630 | 155.511 | VT 25 in Bradford, VT | SR 25 in Porter, ME | — | — | Mostly follows the old New England Route 25 |
| NH 26 | 30.847 | 49.643 | VT 26 to VT 102 in Lemington, VT | SR 26 in Upton, ME | 1925 | current | Mostly follows the old New England Route 26 |
| NH 27 | 37.621 | 60.545 | US 3 / NH 28 in Hooksett | NH 1A in Hampton Beach | — | — | |
| NH 28 | 85.413 | 137.459 | MA 28 in Methuen, MA | NH 16 in Ossipee | — | — | Mostly follows the old New England Route 28 |
| NH 31 | 56.148 | 90.361 | MA 31 in Ashby, MA | NH 10 in Goshen | — | — | |
| NH 32 | 14.139 | 22.755 | MA 32 in Royalston, MA | NH 12 in Keene | — | — | Mostly follows the old New England Route 32 |
| NH 33 | 9.090 | 14.629 | NH 108 in Stratham | US 1 in Portsmouth | 1994 | current | Former routing of eastern segment of NH 101 |
| NH 38 | 8.7 | 14.0 | MA 38 in Dracut, MA | NH 28 in Salem | — | — | |
| NH 41 | 5.033 | 8.100 | NH 16 in Ossipee | NH 113 in Madison | — | — | |
| NH 43 | 16.418 | 26.422 | NH 101 in Candia | US 4 / US 202 / NH 9 in Northwood | — | — | |
| NH 45 | 5.981 | 9.625 | NH 123 in Greenville | NH 101 in Temple | — | — | |
| NH 47 | 7.148 | 11.504 | NH 136 in Francestown | US 202 / NH 31 in Bennington | — | — | |
| NH 49 | 11.297 | 18.181 | US 3 in Campton | West Branch Road in Waterville Valley | — | — | |
| NH 51 | — | — | NH 108 in Stratham | NH 1A in Hampton Beach | c. 1980 | 1994 | Originally the unnumbered Exeter-Hampton Expressway. Redesignated NH 101 in 1994 |
| NH 63 | 21.514 | 34.623 | MA 63 in Northfield, MA | NH 12 in Westmoreland | — | — | |
| NH 75 | 5.453 | 8.776 | NH 11 in Farmington | NH 125 in Milton | — | — | |
| NH 77 | 17.874 | 28.765 | NH 13 / NH 136 in New Boston | NH 13 in Dunbarton | — | — | |
| NH 78 | 3.456 | 5.562 | MA 78 in Warwick, MA | NH 10 / NH 119 in Winchester | — | — | |
| NH 84 | 4.184 | 6.733 | NH 150 in Kensington | US 1 in Hampton Falls | — | — | |
| NH 85 | 4.854 | 7.812 | NH 27 / NH 111A in Exeter | NH 108 in Newfields | — | — | |
| NH 86 | 2.356 | 3.792 | MA 86 (now MA 286) in Salisbury, MA | NH 1A in Seabrook | — | 1971 | Redesignated NH 286 in 1971 |
| NH 87 | 6.317 | 10.166 | NH 125 in Epping | NH 85 in Hampton Falls | — | — | |
| NH 88 | 6.676 | 10.744 | NH 108 in Exeter | US 1 in Hampton Falls | — | — | |
| NH 97 | 2.563 | 4.125 | NH 28 in Salem | MA 97 in Haverhill, MA | — | — | |
| NH 101 | 95.189 | 153.192 | NH 9 / NH 10 / NH 12 in Keene | NH 1A in Hampton Beach | — | — | |
| NH 102 | 23.956 | 38.553 | NH 3A / NH 111 in Hudson | NH 107 in Raymond | — | — | |
| NH 103 | 48.300 | 77.731 | NH 12 / NH 12A in Claremont | US 202 / NH 9 in Hopkinton | — | — | |
| NH 104 | 23.350 | 37.578 | US 4 in Danbury | US 3 in Meredith | — | — | |
| NH 106 | 34.535 | 55.579 | US 3 in Pembroke | US 3 in Meredith | — | — | |
| NH 107 | 69.108 | 111.219 | US 1 in Seabrook | US 3 in Laconia | — | — | |
| NH 108 | 42.430 | 68.284 | MA 108 in Haverhill, MA | NH 125 / NH 202A in Rochester | — | — | |
| NH 109 | 41.029 | 66.030 | SR 109 in Acton, ME | NH 113 in Sandwich | — | — | |
| NH 110 | 24.856 | 40.002 | US 3 in Northumberland | NH 16 in Berlin | — | — | |
| NH 111 | 50.026 | 80.509 | MA 111 in Pepperell, MA | NH 1A in North Hampton | — | — | |
| NH 112 | 56.387 | 90.746 | US 302 / NH 10 in Bath | NH 16 / NH 113 in Conway | — | — | |
| NH 113 | 40.456 | 65.108 | US 3 / NH 25 in Holderness | US 302 in Conway | — | — | |
| SR 113 | 6.0 | 9.7 | SR 113 in Conway | SR 113 in Chatham | 1937 | current | Maintains Maine State Route designation. Two segments within New Hampshire totaling 6.0 miles (9.7 km) in NH. Unrelated to NH 113. NH 113B is a loop of SR 113 |
| NH 114 | 60.433 | 97.257 | NH 101 in Bedford | NH 10 in Grantham | 1931 | current | |
| NH 115 | 9.697 | 15.606 | US 3 in Carroll | US 2 in Jefferson | — | — | |
| NH 116 | 48.605 | 78.222 | NH 10 in Haverhill | US 2 in Jefferson | — | — | |
| NH 117 | 8.095 | 13.028 | US 302 / NH 10 in Lisbon | NH 18 / NH 116 in Franconia | — | — | |
| NH 118 | 37.003 | 59.551 | US 4 in Canaan | NH 112 in Woodstock | — | — | |
| NH 119 | 39.908 | 64.226 | VT 119 to US 5 / VT 142 in Brattleboro, VT | MA 119 in Ashburnham, MA | — | — | |
| NH 120 | 26.928 | 43.336 | NH 11 / NH 103 in Claremont | NH 10 in Hanover | — | — | |
| NH 121 | 22.555 | 36.299 | North Main Street to MA 125 in Haverhill, MA | NH 28 Bypass in Manchester | — | — | |
| NH 122 | 12.614 | 20.300 | Hollis Street in Pepperell, MA | NH 101 in Amherst | — | — | |
| NH 123 | 63.055 | 101.477 | VT 123 to US 5 in Westminster, VT | Mason Road in Townsend, MA | — | — | |
| NH 124 | 28.083 | 45.195 | NH 101 in Marlborough | Turnpike Road in Townsend, MA | — | — | |
| NH 125 | 51.994 | 83.676 | MA 125 in Haverhill, MA | NH 16 / NH 153 in Wakefield | — | — | |
| NH 126 | 15.265 | 24.567 | NH 9 in Barrington | NH 28 in Barnstead | — | — | |
| NH 127 | 31.636 | 50.913 | US 202 / NH 9 in Hopkinton | NH 132 in Sanbornton | — | — | |
| NH 128 | 16.059 | 25.844 | Mammoth Road in Dracut, MA | NH 28 in Londonderry | — | — | |
| NH 129 | 8.724 | 14.040 | South Village Road in Loudon | NH 107 in Gilmanton | — | — | |
| NH 130 | 12.739 | 20.501 | NH 13 in Brookline | NH 101A in Nashua | — | — | |
| NH 132 | 40.112 | 64.554 | NH 9 in Concord | US 3 / NH 25 in Ashland | — | — | Formerly NH 3B |
| NH 135 | 46.678 | 75.121 | NH 10 in Woodsville | US 2 / US 3 in Lancaster | — | — | |
| NH 136 | 17.459 | 28.098 | US 202 / NH 123 in Peterborough | NH 13 / NH 77 in New Boston | — | — | |
| NH 137 | 16.583 | 26.688 | US 202 / NH 124 in Jaffrey | US 202 in Hancock | — | — | |
| NH 140 | 21.142 | 34.025 | I-93 / US 3 / NH 11 / NH 132 in Tilton | NH 11 / NH 28A in Alton | — | — | |
| NH 141 | 2.172 | 3.495 | NH 18 in Franconia | US 3 in Franconia | — | — | |
| NH 142 | 19.688 | 31.685 | NH 18 in Franconia | NH 135 in Dalton | — | — | |
| NH 145 | 13.133 | 21.136 | US 3 in Colebrook | US 3 in Pittsburg | — | — | |
| NH 149 | 13.756 | 22.138 | US 202 / NH 9 in Hillsborough | NH 77 to NH 114 in Weare | — | — | |
| NH 150 | 5.743 | 9.242 | MA 150 in Amesbury, MA | NH 108 in Kensington | — | — | |
| NH 151 | 6.370 | 10.252 | US 1 in North Hampton | NH 33 in Greenland | — | — | |
| NH 152 | 15.449 | 24.863 | US 4 in Northwood | NH 108 in Newmarket | — | — | |
| NH 153 | 50.566 | 81.378 | NH 11 in Farmington | NH 16 / NH 113 in Conway | — | — | 1.953 miles (3.143 km) of the route run within Maine |
| NH 155 | 11.259 | 18.120 | NH 125 in Epping | NH 9 in Dover | — | — | |
| NH 156 | 6.424 | 10.338 | NH 27 / NH 107 in Raymond | NH 152 in Nottingham | — | — | |
| NH 171 | 15.194 | 24.452 | NH 109 in Moultonborough | NH 16 in Ossipee | — | — | |
| NH 175 | 25.261 | 40.654 | US 3 / NH 25 in Holderness | US 3 in Woodstock | — | — | |
| NH 236 | 2.589 | 4.167 | NH 108 in Somersworth | SR 9 in Berwick, ME | — | — | Implied continuation with Maine State Route 236 |
| NH 286 | 2.356 | 3.792 | MA 286 in Salisbury, MA | NH 1A in Seabrook | 1971 | current | Formerly NH 86; continuation of MA 286 |
Former

== Auxiliary routes ==
| Number | Length (mi) | Length (km) | Southern or western terminus | Northern or eastern terminus | Formed | Removed | Notes |
|---|---|---|---|---|---|---|---|
| NH 1A | 18.405 | 29.620 | Route 1A in Salisbury, MA | US 1 in Portsmouth | — | — | |
| NH 1B | 4.808 | 7.738 | NH 1A in Portsmouth | US 1 in Portsmouth | — | — | |
| NH 3A | 39.412 | 63.427 | Route 3A in Tyngsborough | US 3 in Concord | — | — | Southern segment |
| NH 3A | 31.015 | 49.914 | US 3 / NH 11 / NH 127 in Franklin | I-93 / US 3 / NH 25 in Plymouth | — | — | Northern segment |
| NH 3B | 40.08 | 64.50 | NH 9 in Concord | US 3 / NH 25 in Ashland | — | — | Redesignated NH 132 |
| NH 4A | 23.955 | 38.552 | NH 11 in Andover | US 4 in Lebanon | — | — | Auxiliary of US 4 |
| NH 9A | 2.320 | 3.734 | NH 9 in Chesterfield | NH 9 in Chesterfield | — | — | |
| NH 10A | 0.548 | 0.882 | VT 10A to I-91 / US 5 in Norwich, VT | NH 10 in Hanover | — | — | |
| NH 11A | 12.852 | 20.683 | US 3 / NH 11 in Belmont | NH 11 in Alton | — | — | |
| NH 11B | 5.185 | 8.344 | NH 11A in Gilford | US 3 in Laconia | — | — | |
| NH 11C | 1.734 | 2.791 | NH 11 in Gilford | NH 11B in Gilford | — | — | |
| NH 11D | 3.29 | 5.29 | NH 11 in Alton | NH 11 in Alton | — | — | Still named "Route 11D," but is under jurisdiction of the town of Alton |
| NH 12A | 21.598 | 34.759 | NH 12 in Keene | NH 12 in Charlestown | — | — | Southern segment |
| NH 12A | 26.900 | 43.291 | NH 12 in Charlestown | US 4 / NH 10 in Lebanon | — | — | Northern segment |
| NH 16A | 2.484 | 3.998 | US 302 / NH 16 in Bartlett | US 302 / NH 16 in Bartlett | — | — | Southern segment; unsigned US 302 Business |
| NH 16A | 1.029 | 1.656 | NH 16 in Jackson | NH 16 in Jackson | — | — | Northern segment |
| NH 16A | — | — | NH 16 (now NH 108) near Dover | NH 16 (now NH 108) near Somersworth | — | — | overlapped NH 9 and NH 236 |
| NH 16B | 5.381 | 8.660 | NH 16A in Jackson | NH 16A in Jackson | — | — | |
| NH 16B | 2.52 | 4.06 | NH 16 in Center Ossipee | NH 16 in Center Ossipee | — | — | old alignment of NH 16 through the village of Center Ossipee |
| NH 16B | — | — | NH 16 (now NH 108) near Dover | NH 125 near Rochester | — | — | now Old Dover Road |
| NH 16B | — | — | NH 16 in Laskey Corner | NH 16 near Wakefield | — | — | mostly became part of NH 125 and NH 153; rest is now Wakefield Road |
| NH 25A | 15.029 | 24.187 | VT 25A to US 5 in Fairlee, VT | NH 25 / NH 118 in Wentworth | — | — | |
| NH 25B | 3.246 | 5.224 | US 3 / NH 25 in Center Harbor | NH 25 in Center Harbor | — | — | |
| NH 25C | 13.218 | 21.272 | NH 10 / NH 25 in Piermont | NH 25 / NH 118 in Warren | — | — | |
| NH 28 Bypass | 14.124 | 22.730 | NH 28 in Derry | US 3 / NH 28 in Hooksett | — | — | |
| NH 28A | 7.623 | 12.268 | NH 28 in Londonderry | US 3 / NH 28 in Hooksett | — | — | Southern segment |
| NH 28A | 3.716 | 5.980 | NH 11 / NH 28 in Alton | NH 28 in Alton | — | — | Northern segment |
| NH 101A | 13.819 | 22.240 | NH 101 in Milford | NH 111 in Nashua | — | — | |
| NH 101B | 8.5 | 13.7 | US 3 / NH 28 in Hooksett | NH 101 in Candia | — | — | Historic western segment, currently part of NH 27 and NH 43 |
| NH 101B | — | — | Islington Street/Middle Road in Portsmouth (formerly NH 101, currently NH 33) | NH 1B in Portsmouth | — | 1971 | Historic eastern segment, redesignated NH 101 in 1971, then NH 33 in 1994. The section east of US 1 has been unnumbered since 1971. |
| NH 101C | — | — | NH 108 in Exeter | NH 1A in Hampton | — | — | Redesignated NH 27 |
| NH 101D | — | — | NH 27 in Hampton | NH 1A in Hampton | — | — | Entire route redesignated NH 111 |
| NH 101E | 2.357 | 3.793 | US 1 in Hampton | NH 1A in Hampton | — | — | Poorly signed, known locally as Winnacunnet Road. Has never connected with NH 101, its "parent", or any of its spurs. |
| NH 103A | 7.720 | 12.424 | NH 103 in Newbury | NH 11 in New London | — | — | |
| NH 103B | 3.441 | 5.538 | NH 103 in Newbury | NH 11 in Sunapee | — | — | |
| NH 107A | 6.349 | 10.218 | South Hampton Road in Amesbury, MA | NH 107 in Kingston | — | — | |
| NH 109A | 8.743 | 14.070 | NH 28 / NH 109 in Wolfeboro | NH 109 in Tuftonboro | — | — | |
| NH 110A | 3.897 | 6.272 | NH 110 in Milan | NH 16 in Dummer | — | — | |
| NH 110B | 4.626 | 7.445 | NH 110A in Milan | NH 16 in Milan | — | — | |
| NH 111A | 4.935 | 7.942 | NH 111 in Hollis | Everett Turnpike / US 3 / NH 111 in Nashua | — | — | Western segment |
| NH 111A | 9.173 | 14.763 | NH 128 in Pelham | NH 111 in Nashua | — | — | Middle segment |
| NH 111A | 15.024 | 24.179 | NH 111 in Danville | NH 27 / NH 108 / NH 111 in Exeter | — | — | Eastern segment |
| NH 113A | 13.222 | 21.279 | NH 113 in Sandwich | NH 113 in Tamworth | — | — | |
| NH 113B | 3.95 | 6.36 | SR 113 in Stow, ME | SR 113 in Stow, ME | — | — | Auxiliary of Maine State Route 113; 1.00 mile (1.61 km) of the route runs within Maine. |
| NH 114A | 3.696 | 5.948 | NH 114 in Goffstown | I-293 / US 3 / NH 3A in Manchester | — | — | |
| NH 115A | 4.128 | 6.643 | NH 115 in Jefferson | US 2 in Jefferson | — | — | |
| NH 115B | 1.5 | 2.4 | NH 115A in Jefferson | NH 115 in Jefferson | — | — | |
| NH 121A | 15.144 | 24.372 | Route 125 in Haverhill, MA | NH 121 in Chester | — | — | |
| NH 123A | 4.216 | 6.785 | West Road in Ashby, MA | NH 123 / NH 124 in New Ipswich | — | — | |
| NH 123A | 10.070 | 16.206 | NH 123 in Alstead | NH 10 in Marlow | — | — | |
| NH 155A | 3.699 | 5.953 | NH 155 in Lee | NH 155 in Lee | — | — | |
| NH 175A | 0.806 | 1.297 | US 3 / NH 25 in Plymouth | NH 175 in Holderness | — | — | |
| NH 202A | 14.639 | 23.559 | US 202 / NH 9 in Northwood | NH 108 / NH 125 in Rochester | — | — | Loop of U.S. Route 202 |
Former
