= New Hampshire Route 31 =

State highway in southern New Hampshire, US

New Hampshire Route 31
- Map of southern New Hampshire with NH 31 highlighted in red

Route information
- Maintained by NHDOT
- Length: 56.148 mi (90.361 km)

Major junctions
- South end: Route 31 in Ashby, MA
- NH 101 in Wilton; US 202 / NH 47 in Bennington; NH 9 in Hillsborough
- North end: NH 10 in Goshen

Location
- Country: United States
- State: New Hampshire
- Counties: Hillsborough, Sullivan

Highway system
- New Hampshire Highway System; Interstate; US; State; Turnpikes
← NH 28 Bypass	→ NH 32

New Hampshire Route 31 (abbreviated NH 31) is a 56.148-mile-long (90.361 km) north–south state highway in southern New Hampshire. It runs from Mason on the Massachusetts border, where, as Greenville Road, the road becomes Massachusetts Route 31. It passes through Greenville, Wilton, Lyndeborough, Greenfield, Bennington, Antrim, Hillsborough, Windsor, and Washington, reaching its northern terminus of Goshen at New Hampshire Route 10.

== Route description ==
New Hampshire Route 31 begins at the Massachusetts border as a continuation of Massachusetts Route 31. Entering the rural southwestern panhandle of the town of Mason, it intersects New Hampshire Route 124 within 500 yards (460 m) of the Massachusetts border. After a similar distance, it enters the town of Greenville, where it forms the primary north–south road through town.

Entering the town of Wilton, it crosses the Souhegan to the west bank and heads towards the main village of Wilton at the town's northeastern corner. Known locally as Greenville Road over this stretch, it merges with NH 101 to follow Gibbons Highway, crosses the Souhegan again as it enters Wilton Village, leaves NH 101 and turns north on Island Street to cross both the Souhegan and Stony Brook, then turns northwest along Forest Road at an intersection with Main Street. Now following Stony Brook, it crosses over it several times before crossing the town's northern border and entering the rural town of Lyndeborough. Passing through the modern village near the southwestern corner of town (the historic village is located at Lyndeborough Center Historic District some distance away), it continues along Forest Road until it leaves to the northwest into the town of Greenfield, New Hampshire.

In Greenfield, it is still known as Forest Road, and passes the northern slopes of North Pack Monadnock Mountain and the southern slopes of Crotched Mountain. In the central village of Greenfield, it has a brief concurrency with NH 136, then leaves Forest Road along Sawmill Road to the northwest, entering Bennington, where the name changes to Greenfield Road. Winding through several streets of the main village of Bennington, including Main Street, Francestown Road, and Old Hancock Road, it meets the western terminus of NH 47 and passes by dam at the north end of Powder Mill Pond reservoir near the Great Falls of the Contoocook River, and then merges with US 202.

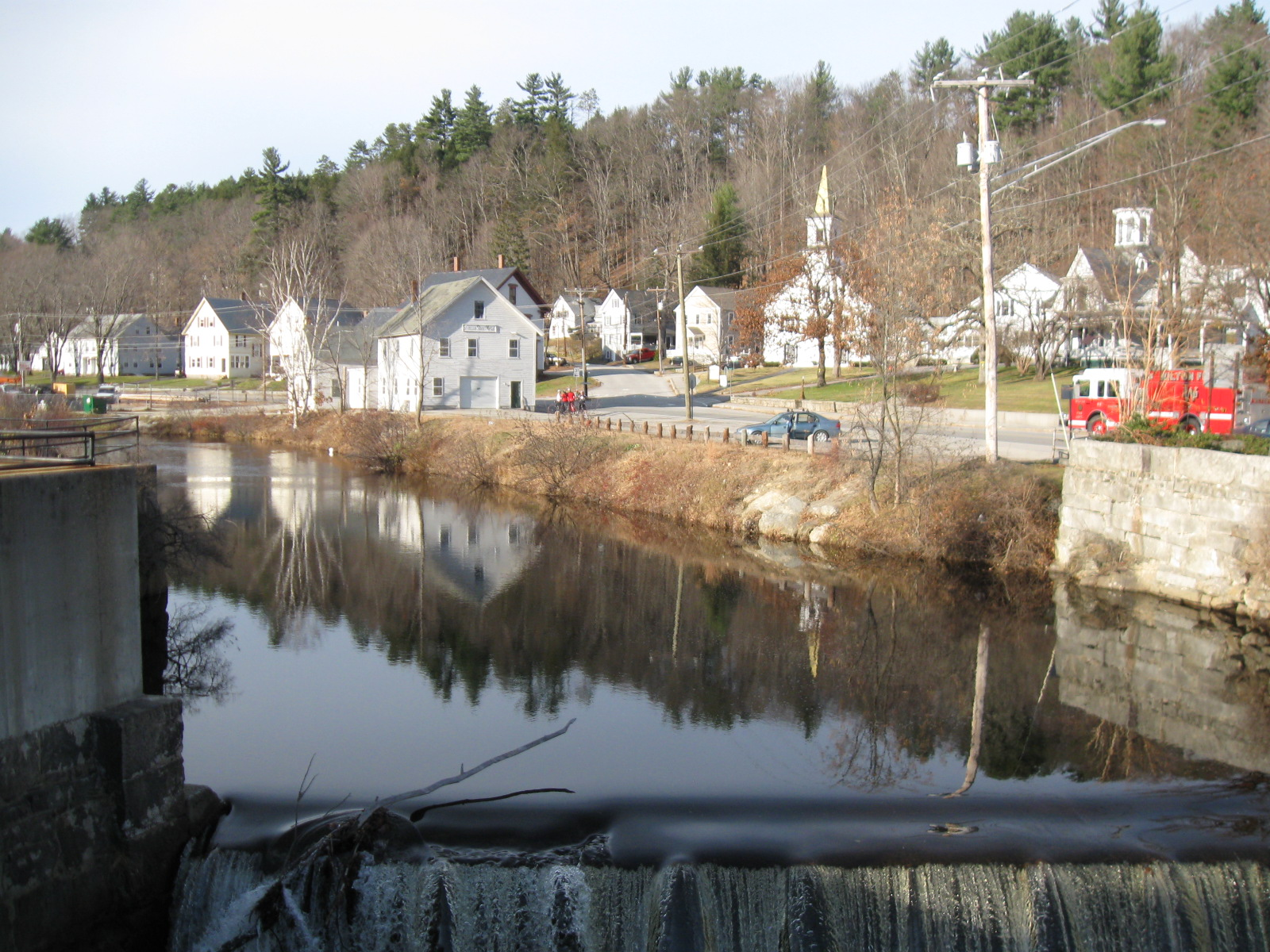
NH 31 follows Forest Road along the north bank of the Souhegan River in the main village of the town of Wilton

Heading north along with US 202, the two routes enter the town of Antrim, New Hampshire, following Main Street into the main village of Antrim at the town's southeastern corner, where US 202 leaves towards the northeast, while NH 31 follows Main Street to the northwest. Changing names to Clinton Road, NH 31 follows the Great Brook northwest, and then turns due north to the village of Antrim Center. Turning again northwest, it meets NH 9 at a T-intersection, and turns right to follow eastbound NH 9 in a northeasterly direction along Keene Road. Curving around the shores of Franklin Pierce Lake, the two routes enter the town of Hillsborough, where NH 31 leaves to the northwest along Second New Hampshire Turnpike at the lake's northern tip. Heading first northwest, then west, along Second New Hampshire Turnpike, the route leaves Hillsborough, crosses the northern tip of the town of Windsor, it next enters Washington.

In Washington, the route turns in a generally northwesterly direction, it passes through the central village of Washington, along Main Street, before heading towards Pillsbury State Park at the town's northern end. Entering the town of Goshen, New Hampshire as Washington Road, it reaches its northern terminus at NH 10 in a rural area south of Goshen's main village.

== Junction list ==
County	Location	mi	km	Destinations	Notes
Hillsborough	Mason	0.000	0.000	Route 31 south (Greenville Road) – Ashby	Continuation from Massachusetts
Hillsborough	Mason	0.575	0.925	NH 124 (Barrett Hill Road/Old Turnpike Road) – New Ipswich, Townsend MA	
Hillsborough	Greenville	3.351	5.393	NH 123 south (Mason Road) – Mason	Southern end of concurrency with NH 123
Hillsborough	Greenville	3.619	5.824	NH 123 north (Pleasant Street) – Greenville, New Ipswich	Northern end of concurrency with NH 123
Hillsborough	Wilton	9.321	15.001	NH 101 west (Gibbons Highway) – Peterborough	Southern end of concurrency with NH 101
Hillsborough	Wilton	11.315	18.210	NH 101 east (Gibbons Highway) – Milford	Northern end of concurrency with NH 101
Hillsborough	Greenfield	22.245	35.800	NH 136 east (Francestown Road) – Francestown	Southern end of concurrency with NH 136
Hillsborough	Greenfield	22.302	35.892	NH 136 west (Forest Road) – Peterborough	Northern end of concurrency with NH 136
Hillsborough	Bennington	27.374	44.054	NH 47 – Francestown	Western terminus of NH 47
Hillsborough	Bennington	27.700	44.579	US 202 west (Concord Street) – Hancock, Peterborough	Southern end of concurrency with US 202
Hillsborough	Antrim	29.989	48.263	US 202 east (Concord Street) – Hillsborough	Northern end of concurrency with US 202
Hillsborough	Antrim	34.291	55.186	NH 9 west (Franklin Pierce Highway) – Stoddard, Keene	Southern end of concurrency with NH 9
Hillsborough	Hillsborough	37.993	61.144	NH 9 east (Franklin Pierce Highway) – Hillsborough, Concord	Northern end of concurrency with NH 9
Sullivan	Goshen	56.148	90.361	NH 10 (Mill Village Road) – Marlow, Keene, Newport	Northern terminus
1.000 mi = 1.609 km; 1.000 km = 0.621 mi: Concurrency terminus

== Local road names ==
Route 31 uses the following names as it passes through different towns:

Mason

- Greenville Road

Greenville

- Fitchburg Road

Wilton

- Greenville Road
- Gibbons Highway (concurrency with NH 101)
- Island Street
- Burns Hill Road
- Forest Road

Lyndeborough

- Forest Road

Greenfield

- Forest Road
- Sawmill Road

Bennington

- Greenfield Road
- School Street
- Pierce Road
- Hancock Road
- concurrency with U.S. Route 202

Antrim

- Main Street (concurrency with US-202)
- Clinton Road
- Old North Branch Road
- Franklin Pierce Highway (concurrency with NH 9)

Hillsborough

- Franklin Pierce Highway (concurrency with NH 9)
- Second New Hampshire Turnpike

Windsor

- Second New Hampshire Turnpike

Washington

- Main Street

Goshen

- Washington Road
- Mill Village Road
