= New Hampshire Route 43 =

State highway in Rockingham County, New Hampshire, US

New Hampshire Route 43
- NH 43 highlighted in red

Route information
- Maintained by NHDOT
- Length: 16.418 mi (26.422 km)

Major junctions
- South end: NH 101 in Candia
- North end: US 4 / US 202 / NH 9 in Northwood

Location
- Country: United States
- State: New Hampshire
- Counties: Rockingham

Highway system
- New Hampshire Highway System; Interstate; US; State; Turnpikes
← NH 41	→ NH 45

New Hampshire Route 43 is a 16.418-mile-long (26.422 km) north–south state highway in southeastern New Hampshire which runs from Candia to Northwood. The southern terminus of NH 43 is at an interchange with New Hampshire Route 101 in Candia. The northern terminus is at an intersection with U.S. Route 4, U.S. Route 202 and New Hampshire Route 9 in Northwood.

== Route description ==
NH 43 begins in Candia at exit 3 of NH 101. The highway begins on Old Candia Road (which continues west of NH 101 as an unnumbered road) and proceeds north, intersecting with NH 27 before continuing into the town of Deerfield. Upon entering Deerfield, NH 43 turns sharply east, then north again before meeting NH 107. NH 43 and NH 107 form a concurrency of 3.4 miles (5.5 km) through the town center, then NH 107 splits off northwest towards Epsom while NH 43 turns northeast towards Northwood. NH 43 continues north and terminates at the split between US 4 and US 202 / NH 9 in Northwood.

From the northern terminus of NH 43, one may go one of three ways. To the left is the First New Hampshire Turnpike, which carries US 4, US 202, and NH 9 westbound towards Epsom and Concord. Straight ahead is Rochester Road, which carries US 202 and NH 9 eastbound towards Barrington and Rochester. To the right is US 4 eastbound (which becomes Old Turnpike Road upon crossing into Nottingham just to the east) towards Durham and Portsmouth.

== Junction list ==
The entire route is in Rockingham County.

Location	mi	km	Destinations	Notes
Candia	0.000	0.000	Old Candia Road	Continuation beyond southern terminus
Candia	0.000	0.000	NH 101 – Portsmouth, Manchester	Southern terminus; Exit 3 on NH 101
Candia	2.087	3.359	NH 27 (High Street) – Hooksett, Raymond	
Deerfield	7.103	11.431	NH 107 south (Raymond Road) – Raymond	Southern end of concurrency with NH 107
Deerfield	10.593	17.048	NH 107 north (North Road) – Epsom	Northern end of concurrency with NH 107
Northwood	16.418	26.422	US 4 east (First New Hampshire Turnpike) to NH 152 – Lee, Durham, Portsmouth US 202 / NH 9 east (Rochester Road) – Barrington, Dover, Rochester US 4 / US 202 / NH 9 west (First New Hampshire Turnpike) – Epsom, Concord	Northern terminus; continues as US 202/NH 9 east
1.000 mi = 1.609 km; 1.000 km = 0.621 mi: Concurrency terminus
