= New Hampshire Route 124 =

State highway in southern New Hampshire, US

New Hampshire Route 124
- Map of southern New Hampshire with NH 124 highlighted in red

Route information
- Maintained by NHDOT
- Length: 28.083 mi (45.195 km)

Major junctions
- West end: NH 101 in Marlborough
- East end: Greenville Road in Townsend

Location
- Country: United States
- State: New Hampshire
- Counties: Cheshire, Hillsborough

Highway system
- New Hampshire Highway System; Interstate; US; State; Turnpikes
← NH 123A	→ NH 125

New Hampshire Route 124 (abbreviated NH 124) is a 28.083-mile-long (45.195 km) east–west highway in southern New Hampshire, United States. It runs from Marlborough to the Massachusetts border.

The western terminus of NH 124 is in Marlborough at New Hampshire Route 101. The road continues through Marlborough, a short section of Troy and enters the northwestern part of Jaffrey. The road skirts the southern slopes of Mount Monadnock, across Jaffrey, and into Sharon. In Sharon, there is a New Hampshire historical marker (number 68) on the northern side of the road marking the site of a gate that once collected tolls for the 3rd New Hampshire Turnpike, which followed much of the present-day route of NH 124. The road enters New Ipswich and continues through that town.

The eastern terminus of NH 124 is at the Massachusetts state line in Mason. The road continues into Massachusetts as Greenville Road in the town of Townsend.

== Major intersections ==
County	Location	mi	km	Destinations	Notes
Cheshire	Marlborough	0.000	0.000	NH 101 – Keene, Dublin, Peterborough	Western terminus of NH 124
Cheshire	Jaffrey	12.409	19.970	US 202 west (River Street) – Rindge, Winchendon, MA NH 137 north (North Street) – Dublin	Western end of concurrency with US 202; Southern terminus of NH 137
Cheshire	Jaffrey	12.479	20.083	US 202 east (Peterborough Street) – Peterborough, Concord	Eastern end of concurrency with US 202
Hillsborough	New Ipswich	19.008	30.590	NH 123 north – Sharon, Peterborough	Western end of concurrency with NH 123
Hillsborough	New Ipswich	22.397	36.044	NH 123A south (Main Street) – Ashby, MA	Northern terminus of NH 123A (southern segment)
Hillsborough	New Ipswich	23.915	38.487	NH 123 south (Highbridge Road) – Greenville	Eastern end of concurrency with NH 123
Hillsborough	Mason	27.101	43.615	NH 31 (Fitchburg Road) – Greenville, Ashby, MA	
Hillsborough	Mason	28.083	45.195	Greenville Road – Townsend	Massachusetts–New Hampshire line
1.000 mi = 1.609 km; 1.000 km = 0.621 mi: Concurrency terminus
