= Massachusetts Route 97 =

State highway in Essex County, Massachusetts, US

Route 97
- Map of Essex County in northeastern Massachusetts with Route 97 highlighted in red

Route information
- Maintained by MassDOT
- Length: 24.96 mi (40.17 km)

Major junctions
- South end: Route 1A in Beverly
- US 1 in Topsfield; I-95 in Boxford; I-495 in Haverhill
- North end: NH 97 in Salem, NH

Location
- Country: United States
- State: Massachusetts
- Counties: Essex

Highway system
- Massachusetts State Highway System; Interstate; US; State
← Route 96	→ Route 98

Route 97 is a south–north highway in Essex County in northeastern Massachusetts, United States. It connects the cities of Beverly and Haverhill before continuing into Salem, New Hampshire as New Hampshire Route 97.

== Route description ==
Route 97 begins at Route 1A in Beverly, north of the downtown area. Almost immediately, it crosses under Route 128 without intersection; the nearest exit is Exit 45 (formerly 20) to Route 1A. Route 97 passes the Beverly Municipal Airport before crossing into Wenham. Route 97 passes through the western end of town, passing the Ipswich River Wildlife Sanctuary before meeting the northern end of Route 35 in Topsfield, just over the town lines of Wenham and Danvers.

Once in Topsfield, Route 97 crosses the Ipswich River just east of the Topsfield Fairgrounds. It crosses U.S. Route 1 (the Newburyport Turnpike) before heading into the center of town. From there, it continues northward, entering the town of Boxford. Route 97 passes through the village of East Boxford, where it intersects I-95 at Exit 76 (formerly 53). It then heads northward into Georgetown. In Georgetown, Route 97 has a brief concurrency of a tenth of a mile with Route 133 before turning northwestward along West Main Street, passing between Rock Pond and Pentucket Pond into Groveland.

In Groveland, Route 97 meets Route 113 at the banks of the Merrimack River, where both cross along the Bates Bridge into the city of Haverhill. The two routes pass Merrimack Valley Hospital, Riverside Park and Trinity Stadium (known locally for being the site of an exhibition game featuring Babe Ruth) before continuing along the banks of the Merrimack. At Ginty Boulevard, Route 97 leaves Route 113, continuing to Main Street, where Route 97 turns northward, running as a wrong-way concurrency with Route 125 for one block before turning westward onto Winter Street. Route 97 intersects Route 110 before continuing westward out of the downtown area. The route intersects I-495 at Exit 108 (formerly 50) as it continues into the Ayers Village section of the city. It then enters the far northeast corner of the city of Methuen, where after only three-quarters of a mile the route enters Salem, New Hampshire and continues as New Hampshire Route 97. The stretch of Route 97 in Methuen is not directly connected to any other road within the city.

In 2010, a project began to replace the Bates Bridge, 60 feet downstream, with a modern bridge. The project is expected to take two to three years and cost approximately $45 million.

== Major intersections ==
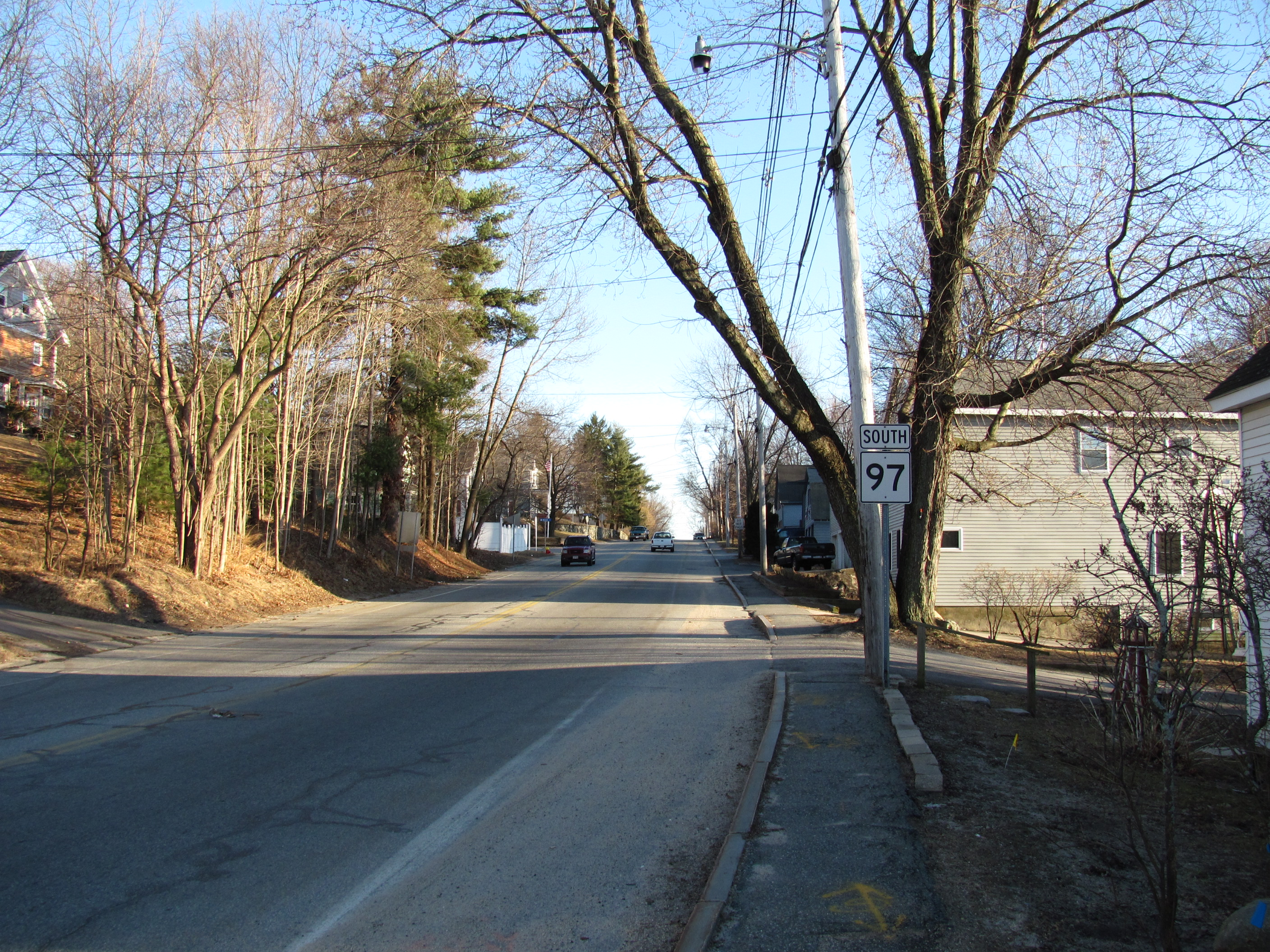
Southbound in Groveland

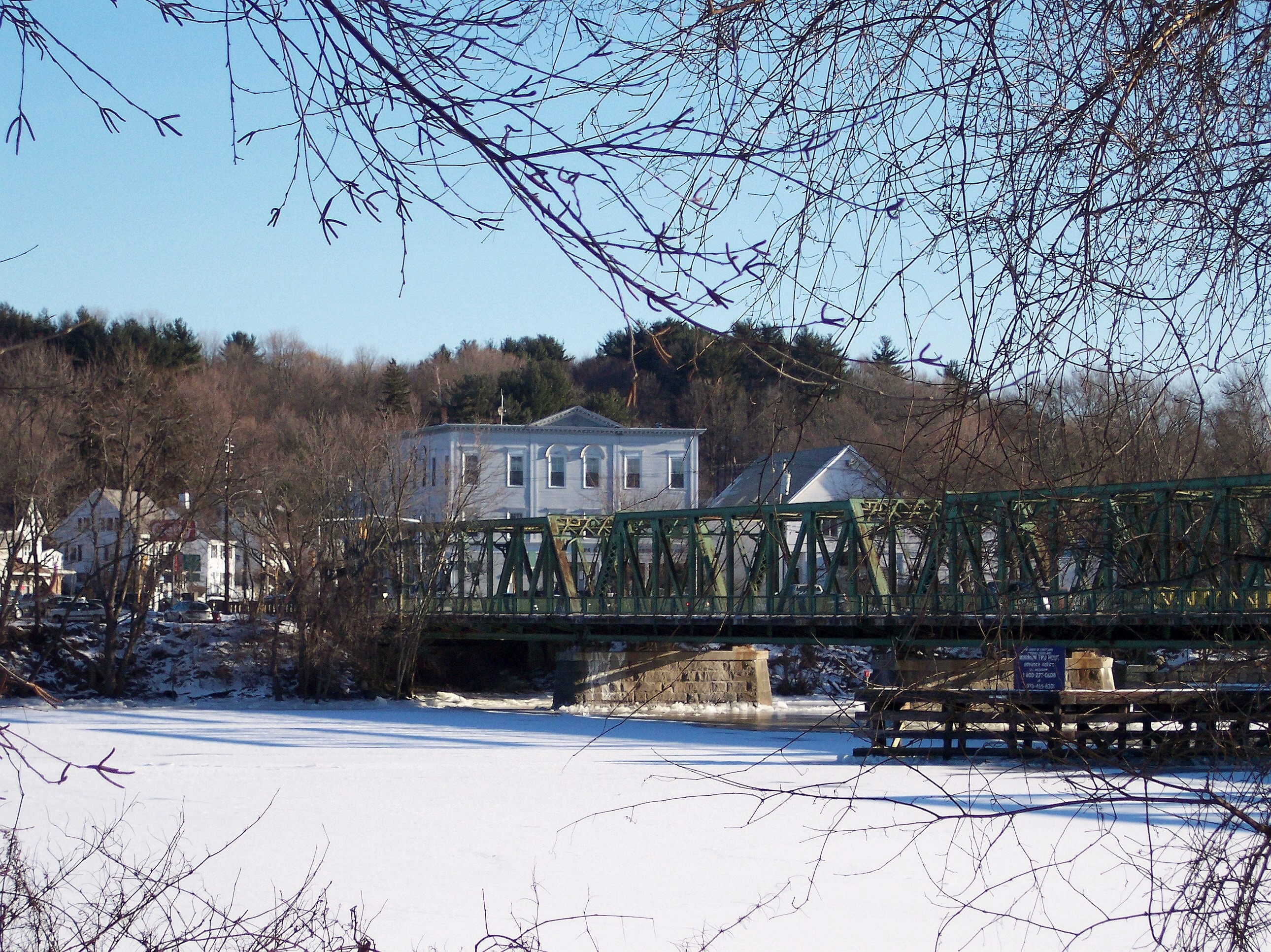
The (former) Bates Bridge carried Routes 97 & 113 across the Merrimack River from Groveland to Haverhill. A new version of this bridge was opened in 2013.

The entire route is in Essex County.

Location	mi	km	Destinations	Notes
Beverly	0.00	0.00	Route 1A – Beverly	Southern terminus of Route 97. To Route 128 Exits 45A-B via Route 1A north.
Beverly	0.2	0.32	Route 128	No access between Route 97 and Route 128.
Topsfield	3.7	6.0	Route 35 – Danvers	Northern terminus of Route 35.
Topsfield	5.5	8.9	US 1 – Newburyport, Salisbury, Danvers	
Boxford	9.4	15.1	I-95 – Salisbury, Portsmouth, NH, Peabody, Boston	I-95 Exit 76
Georgetown	12.6	20.3	Route 133 – West Boxford, North Andover, Rowley	Concurrency with Route 133 for one block.
Groveland	16.4	26.4	Route 113 east – Newburyport	Eastern terminus of concurrency with Route 113.
Haverhill	18.6	29.9	Route 113 west	Western terminus of concurrency with Route 113.
Haverhill	19.1	30.7	Route 125	Concurrency with Route 125 for one block.
Haverhill	19.4	31.2	Route 110 – Salisbury	
Haverhill	21.1	34.0	I-495 – Amesbury, Salisbury, Lawrence, Lowell	I-495 Exit 108.
Methuen	24.96	40.17	NH 97 west – Salem	Continuation into New Hampshire
1.000 mi = 1.609 km; 1.000 km = 0.621 mi: Closed/former; Concurrency terminus

== New Hampshire ==
New Hampshire Route 97

- Map of Rockingham County in southeastern New Hampshire with NH 97 highlighted in red

Route information
- Maintained by NHDOT
- Length: 2.563 mi (4.125 km)

Major junctions
- West end: NH 28 in Salem
- East end: Route 97 in Haverhill, MA

Location
- Country: United States
- State: New Hampshire
- Counties: Rockingham

Highway system
- New Hampshire Highway System; Interstate; US; State; Turnpikes
← I-95	→ NH 101

Route 97 (abbreviated NH 97) also has a brief 2.563-mile-long (4.125 km) east–west state highway in Salem, Rockingham County, New Hampshire. The western terminus of the route is in the center of Salem at New Hampshire Route 28 (Broadway). The eastern terminus is at the Massachusetts state line, where the road continues east as Massachusetts Route 97 and continues on to Haverhill. NH 97 is named Main Street along its entire length.

The entire route is in Salem, Rockingham County.

mi	km	Destinations	Notes
0.000	0.000	NH 28 (Broadway) – Methuen MA, Derry	Western terminus
2.563	4.125	Route 97 south (Ayers Village Road) – Haverhill	Continuation into Massachusetts
1.000 mi = 1.609 km; 1.000 km = 0.621 mi
