= NH 97 =

NH 97 may refer to:

- National Highway 97 (India)
- New Hampshire Route 97, United States
