= NH 122 =

NH 122 may refer to:

- National Highway 122 (India)
- New Hampshire Route 122, United States
