= NH 31 =

NH 31 may refer to:

- National Highway 31 (India)
- New Hampshire Route 31, United States
