= NH 43 =

NH 43 may refer to:

- National Highway 43 (India)
- New Hampshire Route 43, United States
