= Marlborough, New Hampshire =

- Town
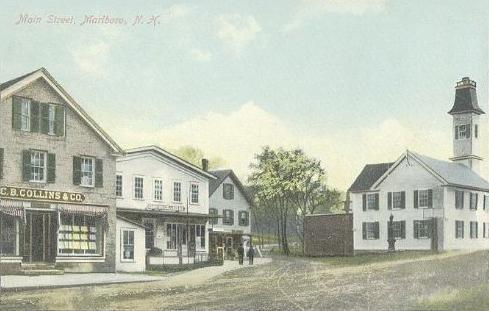
- Main Street in 1910

- Seal
- Motto: "Small Town - Big Heart"
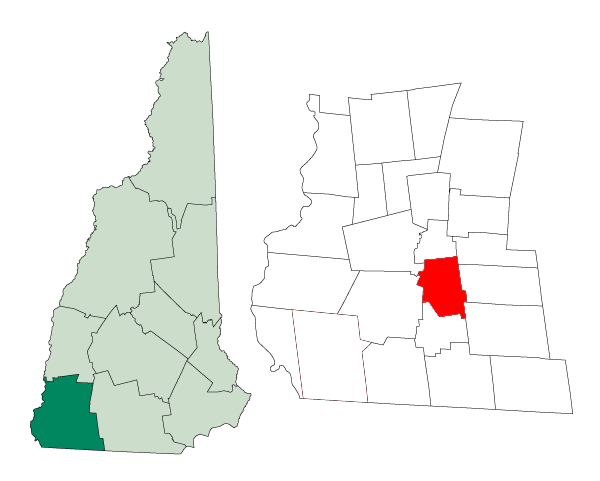
- Location in Cheshire County, New Hampshire
- Coordinates: 42°53′26″N 72°11′03″W
- Country: United States
- State: New Hampshire
- County: Cheshire
- Incorporated: 1776

Area
  - Total: 20.7 sq mi (53.5 km^{2})
  - Land: 20.4 sq mi (52.9 km^{2})
  - Water: 0.23 sq mi (0.6 km^{2}) 1.13%
- Elevation: 1,122 ft (342 m)

Population (2020)
  - Total: 2,096
  - Density: 103/sq mi (39.6/km^{2})
- Time zone: UTC-5 (Eastern)
  - Summer (DST): UTC-4 (Eastern)
- ZIP code: 03455
- Area code: 603
- FIPS code: 33-45460
- GNIS feature ID: 873659
- Website: www.marlboroughnh.gov

Marlborough is a town in Cheshire County, New Hampshire, United States. The population was 2,096 at the 2020 census, and an estimated 2,201 in 2025. The town is home to the Kensan-Devan Wildlife Sanctuary at Meetinghouse Pond.

The primary settlement in town, where 1,066 people resided at the 2020 census, is defined as the Marlborough census-designated place (CDP) and is located at the junction of New Hampshire routes 101 and 124.

== History ==
First granted as "Monadnock No. 5" in 1752 by Governor Benning Wentworth, this was one of the fort towns originally known only by a number. Lots were drawn in 1762 and first settled two years later. The town was at one time called "Oxford", then "New Marlborough", but was incorporated in 1776 as Marlborough. Many of the settlers were from Marlborough, Massachusetts, which had been named for John Churchill, 1st Duke of Marlborough, in the late 17th century. Land was set off in 1815 to create the town of Troy.

There was once an important granite industry here. Stone from Marlborough quarries was used in buildings in Boston, at the College of the Holy Cross in Worcester, Massachusetts, and locally in the Frost Free Library. Blankets and wooden-ware, including toys, have been manufactured in Marlborough as well.

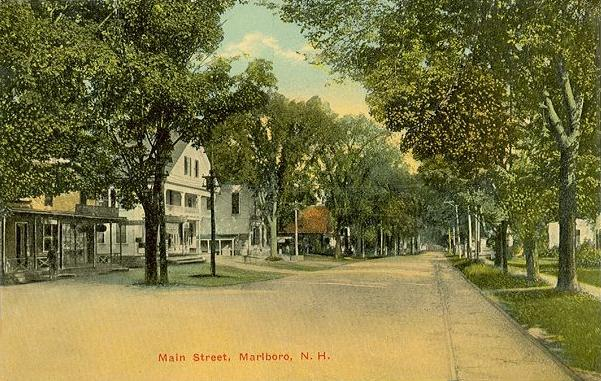
Main Street c. 1910

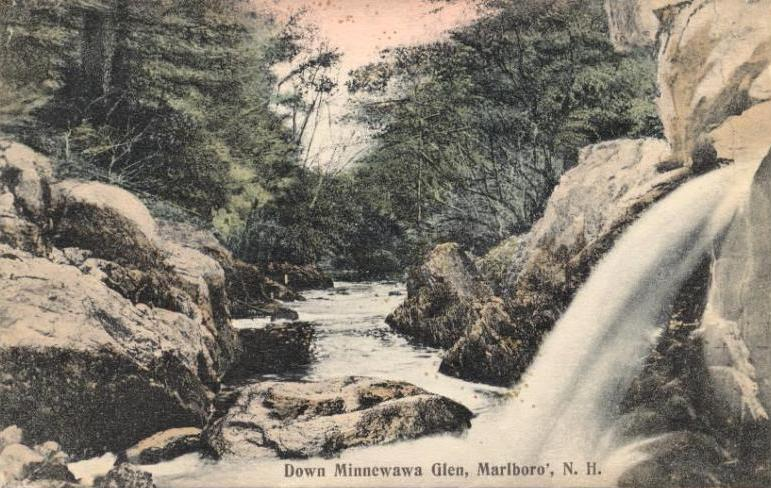
Minnewawa Glen in 1912

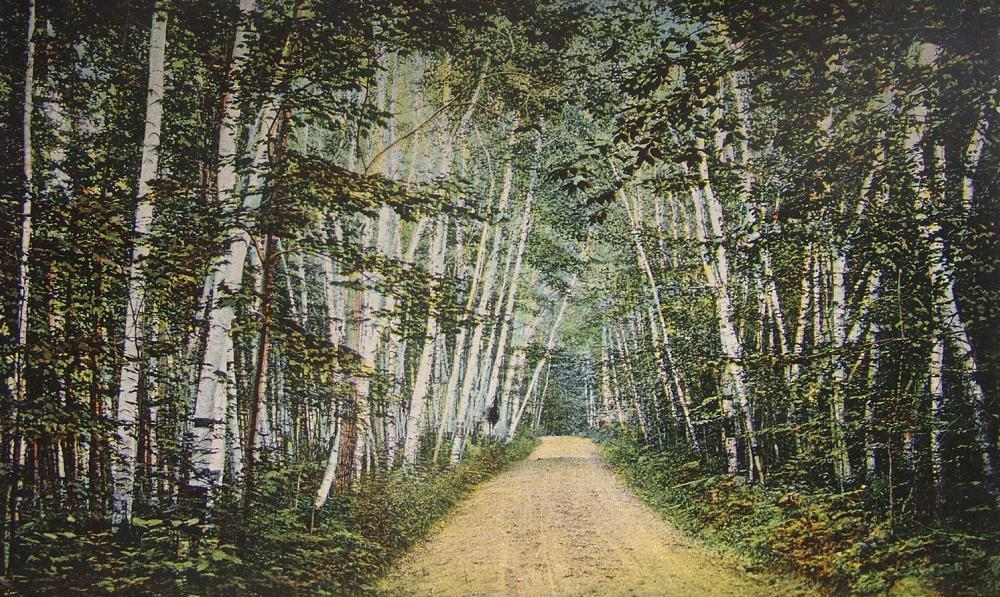
"Birch Avenue" in 1907

== Geography ==
According to the United States Census Bureau, the town has a total area of 20.7 square miles (53.5 km^{2}), of which 20.4 square miles (52.9 km^{2}) are land and 0.2 square miles (0.6 km^{2}) are water, comprising 1.13% of the town. Marlborough is drained by Minnewawa Brook, a westward-flowing tributary of the Ashuelot River and part of the Connecticut River watershed. The town's highest point is near its southeastern corner, on the side of Bigelow Hill, where the elevation reaches 1,516 feet (462 m) above sea level.

Marlborough is served by state routes 101 and 124.

=== Adjacent municipalities ===
- Roxbury (north)
- Harrisville (northeast)
- Dublin (east)
- Jaffrey (southeast)
- Troy (south)
- Swanzey (west)
- Keene (northwest)

== Demographics ==
Historical population
Census	Pop.	Note	%±
1790	786		—
1800	1,185		50.8%
1810	1,142		−3.6%
1820	766		−32.9%
1830	822		7.3%
1840	831		1.1%
1850	887		6.7%
1860	915		3.2%
1870	1,017		11.1%
1880	1,286		26.5%
1890	1,695		31.8%
1900	1,524		−10.1%
1910	1,478		−3.0%
1920	1,380		−6.6%
1930	1,508		9.3%
1940	1,431		−5.1%
1950	1,561		9.1%
1960	1,612		3.3%
1970	1,671		3.7%
1980	1,846		10.5%
1990	1,927		4.4%
2000	2,009		4.3%
2010	2,063		2.7%
2020	2,096		1.6%
2024 (est.)	2,193		4.6%
U.S. Decennial Census

As of the census of 2010, there were 2,063 people, 866 households, and 565 families residing in the town. There were 946 housing units, of which 80, or 8.5%, were vacant. The racial makeup of the town was 97.0% white, 0.4% African American, 0.05% Native American, 0.9% Asian, 0.0% Native Hawaiian or Pacific Islander, 0.2% some other race, and 1.4% from two or more races. 1.4% of the population were Hispanic or Latino of any race.

Of the 866 households, 26.8% had children under the age of 18 living with them, 50.3% were headed by married couples living together, 10.2% had a female householder with no husband present, and 34.8% were non-families. 24.4% of all households were made up of individuals, and 9.6% were someone living alone who was 65 years of age or older. The average household size was 2.38, and the average family size was 2.79.

In the town, 19.8% of the population were under the age of 18, 6.9% were from 18 to 24, 25.0% from 25 to 44, 31.6% from 45 to 64, and 16.6% were 65 years of age or older. The median age was 43.9 years. For every 100 females, there were 95.4 males. For every 100 females age 18 and over, there were 94.2 males.

For the period 2011–2015, the estimated median annual income for a household was $54,491, and the median income for a family was $64,844. Male full-time workers had a median income of $50,069 versus $37,667 for females. The per capita income for the town was $30,219. 8.5% of the population and 7.3% of families were below the poverty line. 24.2% of the population under the age of 18 and 2.1% of those 65 or older were living in poverty.

== Site of interest ==
- Maynard-Gates House (1767), listed on the New Hampshire State Register of Historic Places

== Notable people ==
- Paul Leicester Ford (1865–1902), novelist, biographer
- Rufus S. Frost (1826–1894), U.S. congressman
- Fred Tenney (1859–1919), pro baseball player
