= Massachusetts Route 125 =

North-south state highway in Massachusetts, US

Route 125
- Route 125 highlighted in red

Route information
- Maintained by MassDOT
- Length: 18.90 mi (30.42 km)

Major junctions
- South end: I-93 in Wilmington
- Route 28 in Andover; Route 114 / Route 133 in North Andover; I-495 / Route 97 / Route 110 / Route 113 in Haverhill
- North end: NH 125 in Plaistow, NH

Location
- Country: United States
- State: Massachusetts
- Counties: Middlesex, Essex

Highway system
- Massachusetts State Highway System; Interstate; US; State
← Route 124	→ Route 126

Route 125 is an 18.90-mile-long (30.42 km) north–south Massachusetts state route. It runs from Interstate 93 in Wilmington to the Massachusetts-New Hampshire state line in Haverhill, where it continues as New Hampshire Route 125 through Plaistow to Wakefield, New Hampshire. After the first 1.7 miles (2.7 km), which are in Middlesex County, the rest of the route passes through Essex County.

== Route description ==
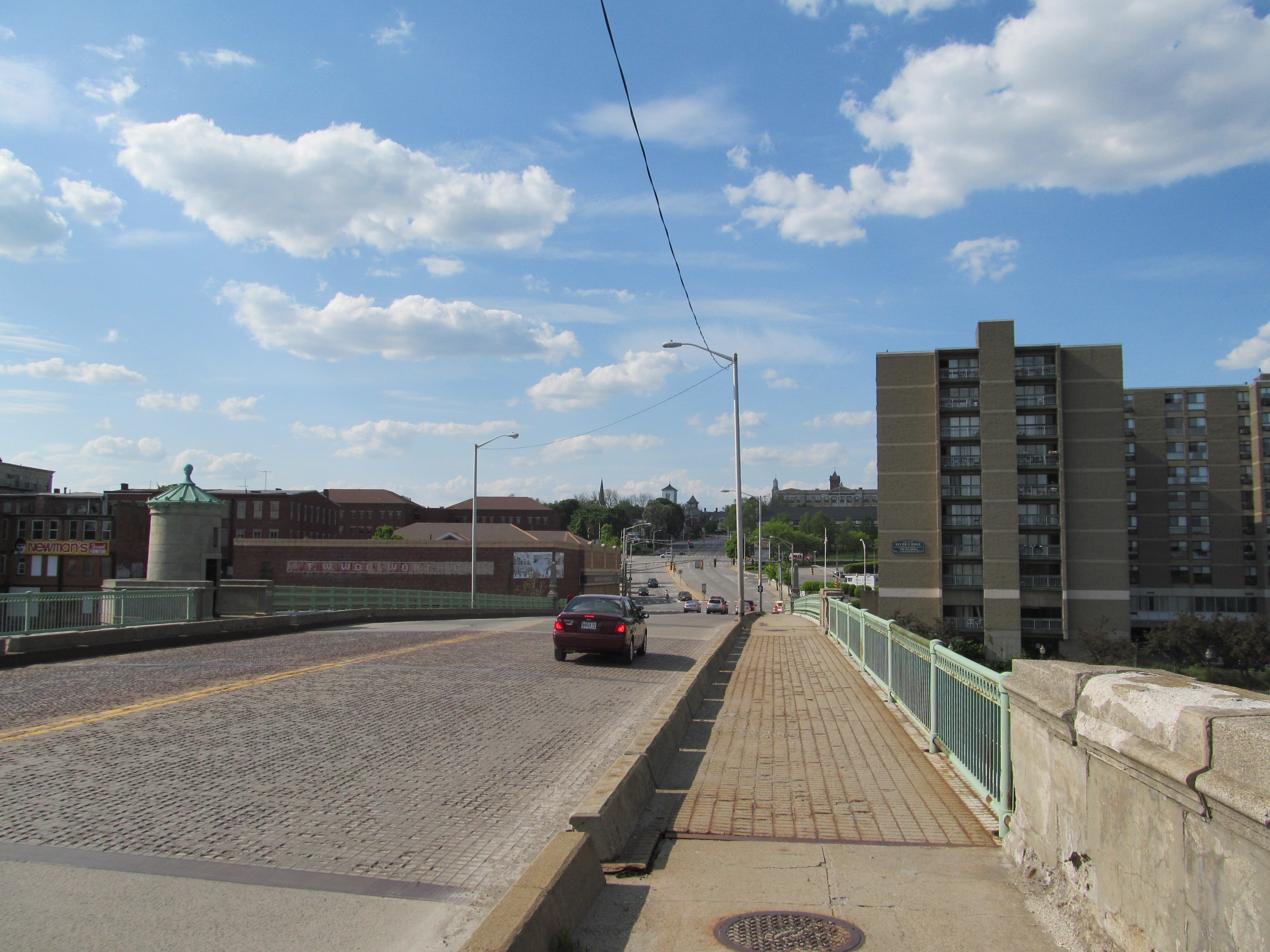
Northbound in Haverhill

Route 125 begins at I-93, at exit 35 (formerly 41), just south of where I-93 drops from four lanes to three. It passes through an area of industrial parks before clipping the northwest corner of North Reading and entering Andover. Once in Andover, the road serves as a bypass road around much of Andover's busier sections. It intersects Route 28 with a cloverleaf interchange as it bends northward through town. The route then enters North Andover, becoming concurrent with Route 114 for half a mile as the two routes pass Merrimack College. Route 125 then splits northward, becoming concurrent with Route 133 again acting as a bypass, this time between North Andover's more densely populated west end and its historical center. The two routes split at a point between Lawrence Municipal Airport and Lake Cochichewick in the northern end of town.

From there, Route 125 passes into Haverhill in the Bradford section of town. In Bradford, Route 125 meets a connector road between it and I-495 which passes through an industrial area. The route then continues through the Bradford area before crossing the Merrimack River at the Basiliere Bridge. Once it crosses the bridge into the downtown Haverhill area, Route 125 crosses Route 113 before sharing a one-block concurrency with Route 97 and a two-block concurrency with Route 110 in quick succession. The route then turns more northwesterly, crossing I-495 directly at Exits 109A-B (formerly 51A-B). The route turns northward at Plaistow Road before entering into Plaistow, New Hampshire and becoming New Hampshire Route 125. Main Street, meanwhile, heads into Plaistow as well, where it meets the end of New Hampshire Route 121.

== Major intersections ==
County	Location	mi	km	Destinations	Notes
Middlesex	Wilmington	0.00	0.00	I-93 to Route 62 – Lawrence, Concord NH, Boston	Southern terminus; I-93 exit 35
Essex	Andover	2.4	3.9	Route 28 – North Reading, Reading, Andover, Lawrence	Cloverleaf intersection
Essex	North Andover	6.9	11.1	Route 114 east – Middleton	Southern end of Route 114 concurrency
Essex	North Andover	7.4	11.9	Route 114 west – Lawrence	Northern end of Route 114 concurrency
Essex	North Andover	7.7	12.4	Route 133 west – Lowell	Southern end of Route 133 concurrency
Essex	North Andover	10.4	16.7	Route 133 east – West Boxford, Georgetown	Northern end of Route 133 concurrency
Essex	Haverhill	13.0	20.9	To I-495 – Amesbury, Salisbury, Lawrence	Connector road to exit 106 on I-495
Essex	Haverhill	15.7	25.3	Route 113	
Essex	Haverhill	15.8	25.4	Route 97	Brief concurrency with Route 97 for one block
Essex	Haverhill	16.0	25.7	Route 110 – Merrimac, Methuen	Brief concurrency with Route 110 for one block
Essex	Haverhill	17.7	28.5	I-495 – Amesbury, Salisbury, Lawrence, Lowell	Exit 109 on I-495
Essex	Haverhill	18.6	29.9	To NH 121 – Atkinson via Main Street	Becomes NH Route 121 at NH border
Essex	Haverhill	18.8	30.3	To NH 121A – Plaistow Village via Cushing Avenue	Becomes NH Route 121A at NH border; signed as Massachusetts Route 121A
Essex	Haverhill	18.90	30.42	NH 125 north – Plaistow, Rochester	Northern terminus
1.000 mi = 1.609 km; 1.000 km = 0.621 mi: Concurrency terminus
