= Raymond (CDP), New Hampshire =

Census-designated place in New Hampshire, United States

Raymond, New Hampshire
- Census-designated place
- American Civil War monument in center of Raymond

- Location within New Hampshire Location within the United States
- Coordinates: 43°02′13″N 71°10′19″W
- Country: United States
- State: New Hampshire
- County: Rockingham
- Town: Raymond

Area
  - Total: 6.64 sq mi (17.19 km^{2})
  - Land: 6.48 sq mi (16.78 km^{2})
  - Water: 0.16 sq mi (0.42 km^{2})
- Elevation: 177 ft (54 m)

Population (2020)
  - Total: 3,738
  - Density: 577.0/sq mi (222.78/km^{2})
- Time zone: UTC-5 (Eastern (EST))
  - Summer (DST): UTC-4 (EDT)
- ZIP code: 03077
- Area code: 603
- FIPS code: 33-63940
- GNIS feature ID: 2378090

Raymond is a census-designated place (CDP) and the main village in the town of Raymond, New Hampshire, United States. The population of the CDP was 3,738 at the 2020 census, out of 10,684 in the entire town.

== Geography ==
The CDP is in the eastern part of the town of Raymond, on both sides of the Lamprey River. The eastern border of the CDP is the Epping and Fremont town line. The northern border follows Ham Road, Harriman Hill Road, Lakeview Road, and Governor Drive. Turning south, the border crosses the southern end of Governors Lake and follows the lake outlet and Smith Pond Road to Long Hill Road, which it follows northwest to Dudley Brook, then south to the Lamprey River. The western border follows the Lamprey and an unnamed brook south to Cider Ferry Road, then runs south on Old Manchester Road to Batchelder Road, which forms the southern boundary of the CDP. The border turns south on New Hampshire Route 107 (Fremont Road) to Prescott Road, which it follows east to the Fremont town line.

The New Hampshire Route 101 freeway crosses the CDP south of the village center, with access from Exits 4 (Old Manchester Road) and 5 (New Hampshire Routes 102 and 107). Route 101 leads east 12 miles (19 km) to Exeter and west 16 miles (26 km) to Manchester. Route 27, the former alignment of Route 101, runs through the northern part of the CDP, leading east 5 miles (8 km) to Epping and west 7 miles (11 km) to Candia. Route 102 has its northern terminus in Raymond and leads southwest 14 miles (23 km) to Derry. Route 156 has its southern terminus in Raymond and leads north 6 miles (10 km) to Nottingham. Route 107 follows Routes 27 and 102 through the CDP but leads northwest 10 miles (16 km) to Deerfield and southeast the same distance to Kingston.

According to the U.S. Census Bureau, the Raymond CDP has a total area of 6.6 square miles (17.2 km^{2}), of which 6.5 square miles (16.8 km^{2}) are land and 0.2 square miles (0.4 km^{2}), or 2.41%, are water.

== Demographics ==
Historical population
Census	Pop.	Note	%±
1980	1,192		—
1990	2,516		111.1%
2000	2,839		12.8%
2010	2,855		0.6%
2020	3,738		30.9%
U.S. Decennial Census

As of the census of 2010, there were 2,855 people, 1,192 households, and 783 families residing in the CDP. There were 1,313 housing units, of which 121, or 9.2%, were vacant. The racial makeup of the CDP was 96.9% white, 0.7% African American, 0.2% Native American, 0.5% Asian, 0.04% Pacific Islander, 0.3% some other race, and 1.4% from two or more races. 1.6% of the population were Hispanic or Latino of any race.

Of the 1,192 households in the CDP, 29.5% had children under the age of 18 living with them, 47.7% were headed by married couples living together, 12.0% had a female householder with no husband present, and 34.3% were non-families. 25.8% of all households were made up of individuals, and 10.0% were someone living alone who was 65 years of age or older. The average household size was 2.40, and the average family size was 2.85.

20.9% of residents in the CDP were under the age of 18, 8.4% were from age 18 to 24, 28.6% were from 25 to 44, 29.1% were from 45 to 64, and 13.0% were 65 years of age or older. The median age was 39.5 years. For every 100 females, there were 96.1 males. For every 100 females age 18 and over, there were 94.9 males.

For the period 2011–15, the estimated median annual income for a household was $60,313, and the median income for a family was $76,610. The per capita income for the CDP was $28,216. 13.0% of the population and 5.6% of families were below the poverty line, along with 11.1% of people under the age of 18 and 13.4% of people 65 or older.
