= Milford (CDP), New Hampshire =

Census-designated place in New Hampshire, United States

Milford, New Hampshire
- Census-designated place
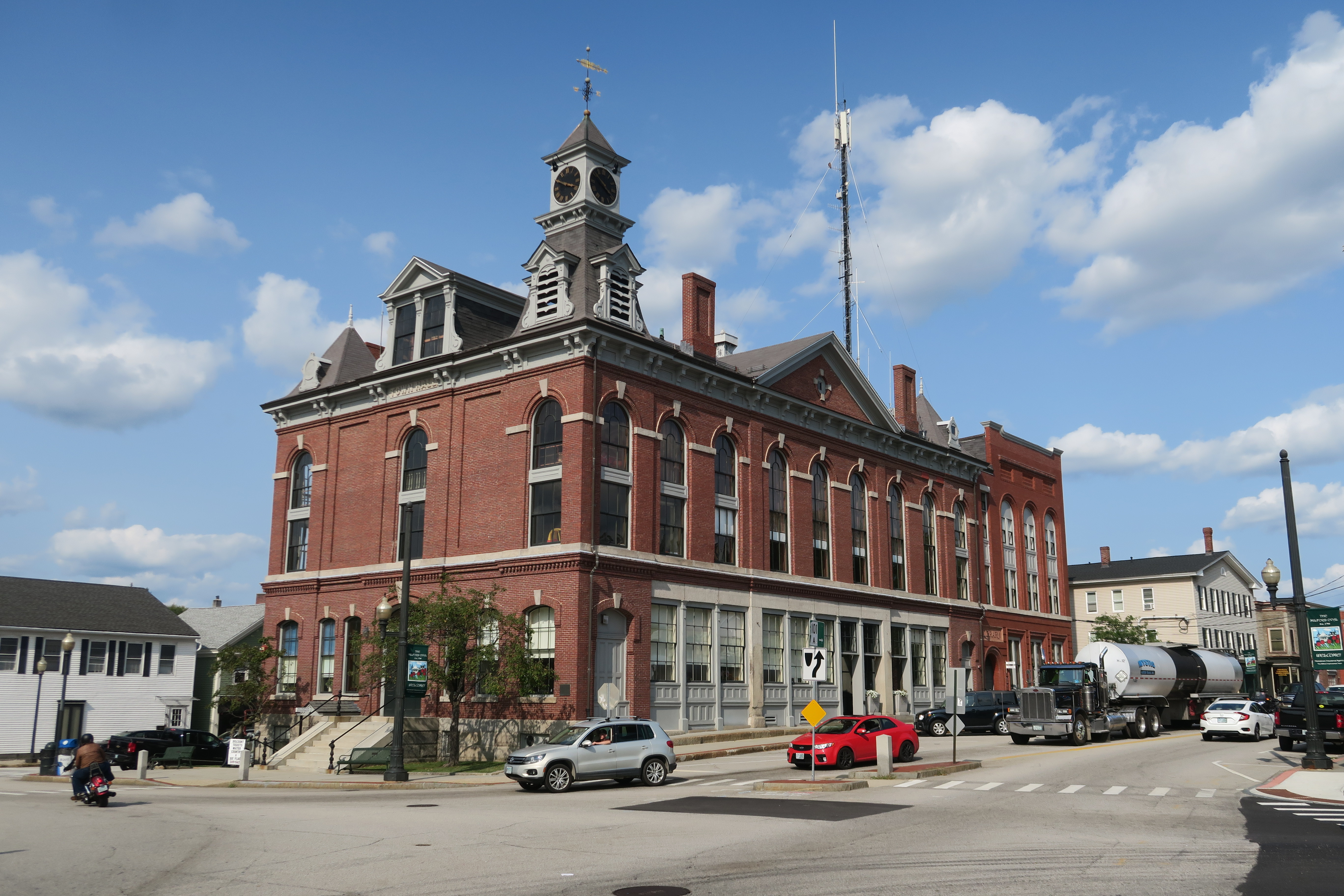
- Milford Town Hall

- Location within New Hampshire Location within the United States
- Coordinates: 42°50′8″N 71°38′56″W
- Country: United States
- State: New Hampshire
- County: Hillsborough
- Town: Milford

Area
  - Total: 5.71 sq mi (14.79 km^{2})
  - Land: 5.68 sq mi (14.72 km^{2})
  - Water: 0.027 sq mi (0.07 km^{2})
- Elevation: 263 ft (80 m)

Population (2020)
  - Total: 9,212
  - Density: 1,621.3/sq mi (625.99/km^{2})
- Time zone: UTC-5 (Eastern (EST))
  - Summer (DST): UTC-4 (EDT)
- ZIP code: 03055
- Area code: 603
- FIPS code: 33-47940
- GNIS feature ID: 2378082

Milford is a census-designated place (CDP) and the main village in the town of Milford, New Hampshire, United States. The population of the CDP was 9,212 at the 2020 census, out of 16,131 in the entire town.

== Geography ==
The CDP occupies the center to northeastern part of the town of Milford, along both sides of the Souhegan River. It is bordered to the northeast by the town of Amherst, to the southeast by Ponemah Hill Road, and to the south by Emerson Road, Armory Road, and Osgood Pond. To the west the CDP extends to Whitten Road so as to include Brookview Drive and Brookview Court, and then follows Tucker Brook downstream to the Souhegan River. North of the river, the CDP border passes north of Riverlea Road and Jennison Road to return to the Amherst town line.

New Hampshire Route 101, a limited-access bypass, runs through the south side of the CDP, leading northeast 19 miles (31 km) to Manchester and west 17 miles (27 km) to Peterborough. New Hampshire Route 13 passes through the center of the CDP (around the Milford Oval), leading north 17 miles (27 km) to Goffstown and south 24 miles (39 km) to Leominster, Massachusetts. New Hampshire Route 101A leads southeast from Milford 11 miles (18 km) to Nashua.

According to the U.S. Census Bureau, the Milford CDP has a total area of 5.7 square miles (14.8 km^{2}), of which 0.03 square miles (0.07 km^{2}), or 0.47%, are water.

== Demographics ==
Historical population
Census	Pop.	Note	%±
1950	3,269		—
1960	3,916		19.8%
1970	4,997		27.6%
1980	6,269		25.5%
1990	8,015		27.9%
2000	8,293		3.5%
2010	8,835		6.5%
2020	9,212		4.3%
U.S. Decennial Census

As of the census of 2010, there were 8,835 people, 3,749 households, and 2,271 families residing in the CDP. There were 4,042 housing units, of which 293, or 7.2%, were vacant. The racial makeup of the CDP was 94.4% white, 1.4% African American, 0.3% Native American, 1.4% Asian, 0.01% Pacific Islander, 0.9% some other race, and 1.7% from two or more races. 2.5% of the population were Hispanic or Latino of any race.

Of the 3,749 households in the CDP, 30.9% had children under the age of 18 living with them, 43.0% were headed by married couples living together, 12.1% had a female householder with no husband present, and 39.4% were non-families. 31.2% of all households were made up of individuals, and 12.1% were someone living alone who was 65 years of age or older. The average household size was 2.33, and the average family size was 2.91.

22.2% of residents in the CDP were under the age of 18, 8.5% were from age 18 to 24, 28.1% were from 25 to 44, 27.0% were from 45 to 64, and 14.1% were 65 years of age or older. The median age was 39.1 years. For every 100 females, there were 91.3 males. For every 100 females age 18 and over, there were 89.2 males.

For the period 2011–15, the estimated median annual income for a household was $49,226, and the median income for a family was $65,676. Male full-time workers had a median income of $47,981 versus $34,833 for females. The per capita income for the CDP was $29,020. 7.5% of the population and 4.5% of families were below the poverty line, along with 10.7% of people under the age of 18 and 3.4% of people 65 or older.
