= Peterborough (CDP), New Hampshire =

Census-designated place in New Hampshire, United States

Peterborough, New Hampshire
- Census-designated place
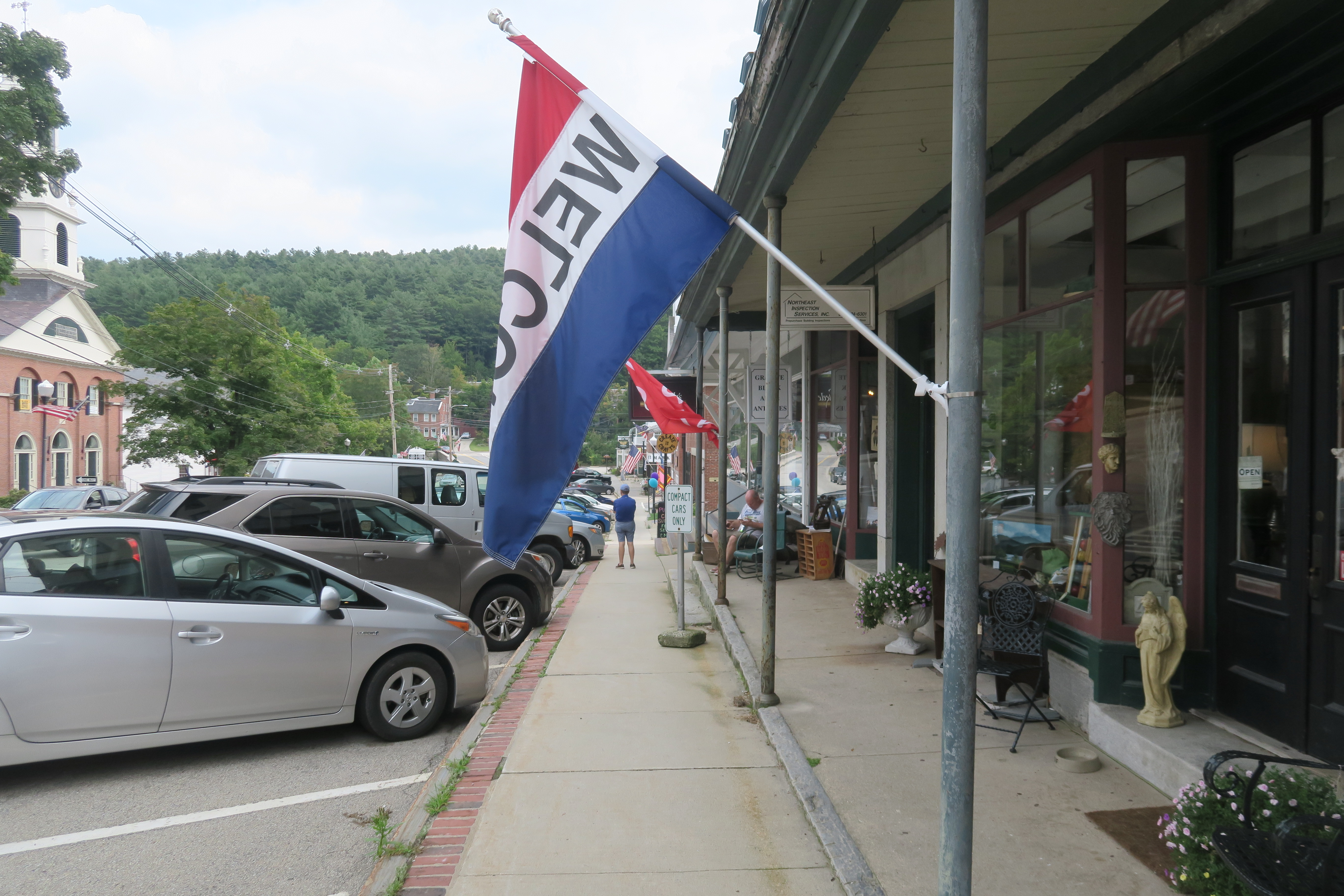
- Main Street

- Location within New Hampshire Location within the United States
- Coordinates: 42°52′36″N 71°57′2″W
- Country: United States
- State: New Hampshire
- County: Hillsborough
- Town: Peterborough

Area
  - Total: 4.79 sq mi (12.41 km^{2})
  - Land: 4.77 sq mi (12.35 km^{2})
  - Water: 0.023 sq mi (0.06 km^{2})
- Elevation: 730 ft (220 m)

Population (2020)
  - Total: 3,090
  - Density: 648.1/sq mi (250.25/km^{2})
- Time zone: UTC-5 (Eastern (EST))
  - Summer (DST): UTC-4 (EDT)
- ZIP code: 03458
- Area code: 603
- FIPS code: 33-60500
- GNIS feature ID: 2378086

Peterborough is a census-designated place (CDP) and the main village in the town of Peterborough, New Hampshire, United States. The population of the CDP was 3,090 at the 2020 census, out of 6,418 in the entire town.

== Geography ==
The CDP occupies the central to west-central part of the town of Peterborough, along both sides of the Contoocook River where it is joined from the west by Nubanusit Brook. The CDP includes the Peterborough town center and extends west up Nubanusit Brook to encompass the village of West Peterborough. The CDP extends north, down the Contoocook River, as far as the area known as North Village, and it extends south, upriver, to the 19th-century factory complex known as Noone.

U.S. Route 202 runs through the eastern side of the CDP, following the Contoocook River. It leads north 19 miles (31 km) to Hillsborough and south 16 miles (26 km) to Winchendon, Massachusetts. New Hampshire Route 101 crosses US 202 south of the village center, leading east 17 miles (27 km) to Milford and west 19 miles (31 km) to Keene.

According to the U.S. Census Bureau, the Peterborough CDP has a total area of 4.8 square miles (12.4 km^{2}), of which 0.02 square miles (0.06 km^{2}), or 0.51%, are water.

== Demographics ==
Historical population
Census	Pop.	Note	%±
1950	1,506		—
1960	1,931		28.2%
1970	2,078		7.6%
1980	2,568		23.6%
1990	2,685		4.6%
2000	2,944		9.6%
2010	3,103		5.4%
2020	3,090		−0.4%
U.S. Decennial Census

As of the census of 2010, there were 3,103 people, 1,442 households, and 750 families residing in the CDP. There were 1,577 housing units, of which 135, or 8.6%, were vacant. The racial makeup of the CDP was 96.3% white, 0.5% African American, 0.1% Native American, 1.8% Asian, 0.0% Pacific Islander, 0.5% some other race, and 0.8% from two or more races. 1.4% of the population were Hispanic or Latino of any race.

Of the 1,442 households in the CDP, 24.0% had children under the age of 18 living with them, 37.0% were headed by married couples living together, 11.1% had a female householder with no husband present, and 48.0% were non-families. 41.2% of all households were made up of individuals, and 20.3% were someone living alone who was 65 years of age or older. The average household size was 2.06, and the average family size was 2.79.

19.2% of residents in the CDP were under the age of 18, 6.9% were from age 18 to 24, 19.9% were from 25 to 44, 27.8% were from 45 to 64, and 26.1% were 65 years of age or older. The median age was 47.9 years. For every 100 females, there were 81.4 males. For every 100 females age 18 and over, there were 77.1 males.

For the period 2011–15, the estimated median annual income for a household was $41,101, and the median income for a family was $82,558. The per capita income for the CDP was $40,090.
