= List of turnpikes in New Hampshire =

New Hampshire Turnpike System
- Standard highway markers for U.S. Route 4, New Hampshire Route 16, Interstate 95, and the Blue Star Turnpike

Highway names
- Interstates: Interstate X (I-X)
- US Highways: U.S. Route n (US X or Route X)
- State: New Hampshire Route X (NH X or Route X)

System links
- New Hampshire Highway System; Interstate; US; State; Turnpikes

The New Hampshire Turnpike System is a system of 93 miles (150 km) of limited-access highway, 36 miles (58 km) of which are part of the National Highway System, within the U.S. state of New Hampshire. The Turnpike System is managed by the New Hampshire Department of Transportation (NHDOT) Bureau of Turnpikes.

== Historical ==
There were a number of turnpikes built in New Hampshire during the period of 1796 to 1830, totaling 500 miles (800 km) in length. These were toll roads for horse traffic, which were built by private companies. Such early turnpikes included:

- First New Hampshire Turnpike – 36 miles (58 km) from Durham to Concord, now part of U.S. Route 4.
- Second New Hampshire Turnpike – Claremont to Amherst. Parts of the route are incorporated in the current NH 31 and NH 47.
- Third New Hampshire Turnpike – from Walpole through Keene to Townsend, Massachusetts. The road followed much of what is now NH 124.
- Chester Turnpike Road – from Pembroke through Allenstown and Candia to Chester.
- Coös Turnpike Road – from Haverhill through Piermont to Warren.
- Grafton Turnpike Road – from Orford to Andover.
- Londonderry Turnpike Road – from Concord to Windham and Salem, via Londonderry. NH 28 Bypass is officially named Londonderry Turnpike.

== Current ==
There are three limited-access highways that make up the New Hampshire Turnpike System:

Number	Length (mi)	Length (km)	Southern or western terminus	Northern or eastern terminus	Formed	Removed	Notes
Blue Star Turnpike	16.13	25.96	I-95 at Salisbury, MA	I-95 at Kittery, ME	1957	current	also known as the New Hampshire Turnpike (I-95)
Everett Turnpike	39.867	64.160	US 3 at Tyngsborough, MA	I-93 / NH 9 in Concord	c. 1955	current	also known as the Central Turnpike or Central New Hampshire Turnpike
Spaulding Turnpike	33.2	53.4	I-95 / US 1 Byp. / US 4 / NH 16 in Portsmouth	NH 16 / NH 125 in Milton	c. 1956	current	overlapped by New Hampshire Route 16

The Blue Star and Spaulding Turnpikes are also known collectively as the Eastern Turnpike.

== See also ==
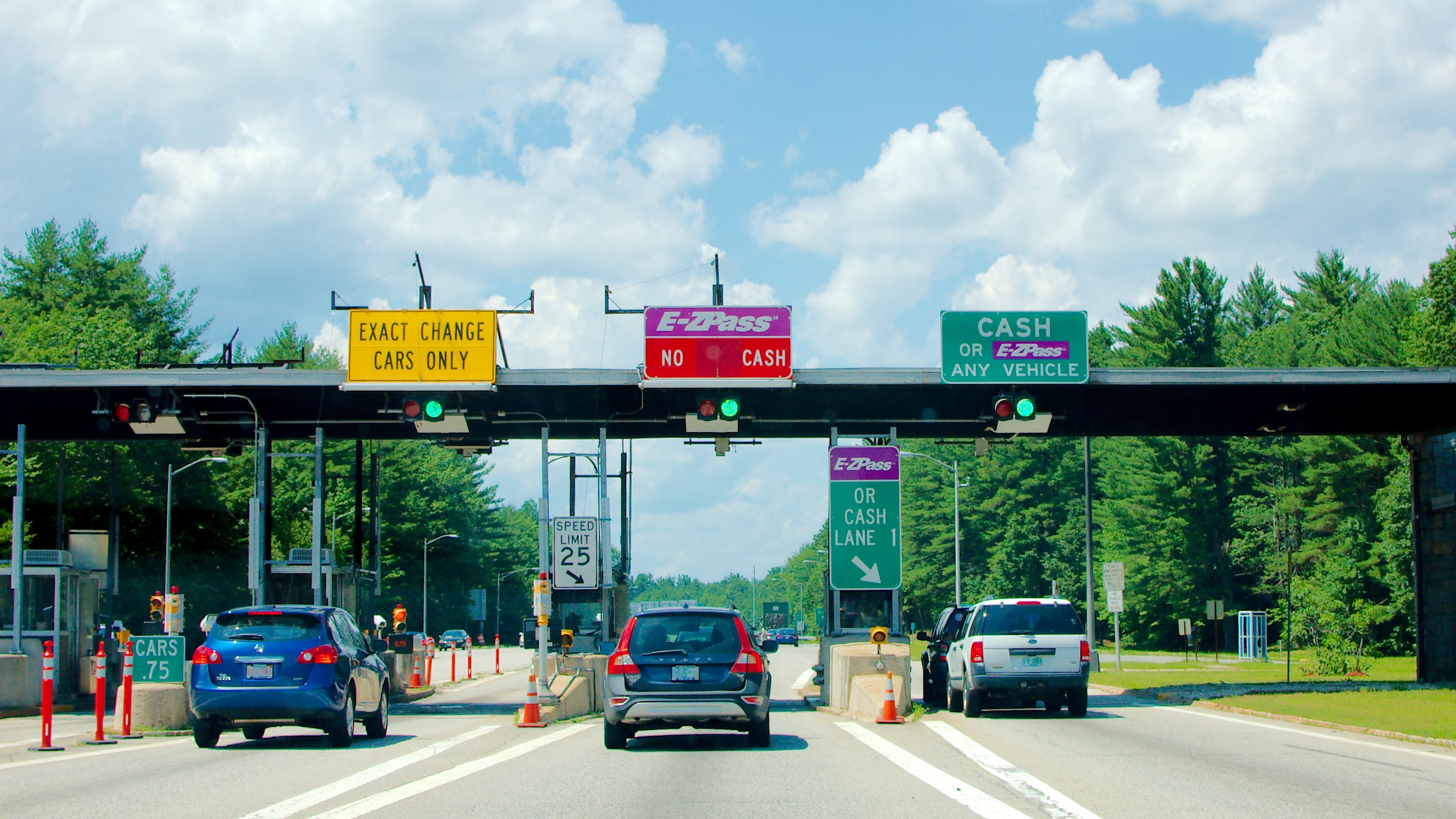
The second toll plaza on the Spaulding Turnpike northbound, near Rochester

- New Hampshire Highway System
- New Hampshire Historical Marker No. 8: Site of Piscataqua Bridge (start of First New Hampshire Turnpike)
- New Hampshire Historical Marker No. 68: Toll House and Toll Gate (part of Third New Hampshire Turnpike)
- New Hampshire Historical Marker No. 160: Haverhill Corner Historic District (northern terminus of Coos Turnpike)
- New Hampshire Historical Marker No. 181: First New Hampshire Turnpike
- New Hampshire Historical Marker No. 228: Cork Plain Bridge – Second NH Turnpike
- New Hampshire Historical Marker No. 250: Pembroke Street (extension of Chester Turnpike)
- New Hampshire Historical Marker No. 252: Bungtown (along Grafton Turnpike)
- New Hampshire Historical Marker No. 253: Londonderry Turnpike
