= List of U.S. Routes in New Hampshire =

United States Numbered Highways of the New Hampshire Highway System
- Highway marker for U.S. Routes 3 and 202
- U.S. Routes in New Hampshire highlighted in red

System information
- Length: 575.693 mi (926.488 km)
- Formed: November 11, 1926

Highway names
- US Highways: U.S. Route nn (US nn)
- Special Routes: U.S. Route nn Business (US nn Bus.); U.S. Route nn Bypass (US nn Byp.)

System links
- New Hampshire Highway System; Interstate; US; State; Turnpikes

The U.S. Highways in New Hampshire comprise six current and one former United States Numbered Highway in New Hampshire. There are three additional highway designations for pair of business routes and a bypass, and there were two other bypasses and a fourth business loop in the past.

== Mainline highways ==
Number	Length (mi)	Length (km)	Southern or western terminus	Northern or eastern terminus	Formed	Removed	Notes
US 1	17.044	27.430	US 1 at Seabrook	US 1 at Portsmouth	1926	current	Mostly follows the old New England Route 1
US 2	35.437	57.030	US 2 at Lancaster	US 2 at Shelburne	1926	current	Mostly follows the old New England Route 15
US 3	241.953	389.386	US 3 at Nashua	Route 257 at Pittsburg	1926	current	Mostly follows the old New England Route 6
US 4	106.834	171.933	US 4 at Lebanon	I-95/US 1 Byp. in Portsmouth	1926	current	Mostly follows the old New England Route 13 between Lebanon and Franklin
US 5	4.5	7.2	Dwinnell St in Walpole	Arch Bridge in North Walpole	1927	1929	Temporarily routed into NH along part of what is now NH 12
US 202	95.270	153.322	US 202 at Rindge	US 202 at Rochester	1935	current	
US 302	79.155	127.388	US 302 at Haverhill	US 302 at Conway	1935	current	Mostly follows the old New England Route 18
Former

== Special routes ==
Number	Length (mi)	Length (km)	Southern or western terminus	Northern or eastern terminus	Formed	Removed	Notes
US 1 Byp.	2.756	4.435	US 1 in Portsmouth	US 1 Byp. at Portsmouth	1940	current	Highway continues into Maine
US 3 Bus.	4.144	6.669	US 3 & NH 11 in Belmont	US 3 in Laconia	—	—	Unsigned, concurrent with NH 107 and NH 11A
US 3 Bus.	—	—	—	—	—	—	
US 3 Byp.	—	—	—	—	—	—	
US 3 Byp.	—	—	—	—	—	—	
US 4 Alt.	—	—	Andover	Boscawen	—	—	
US 4 Byp.	—	—	Concord	Concord	—	—	
US 4 Alt.	—	—	East Northwood	Dover	—	—	
US 302 Bus.	2.49	4.01	US 302/NH 16 in Bartlett	US 302/NH 16 in Bartlett	—	—	Unsigned, concurrent with NH 16A
Former
