= New Hampshire Department of Transportation =

Government agency in the U.S. state of New Hampshire

New Hampshire Department of Transportation (NHDOT)

Agency overview
- Formed: 1986
- Preceding agencies: State Engineer; Division to the Highway Department; New Hampshire Department of Public Works and Highways
- Jurisdiction: New Hampshire
- Headquarters: 7 Hazen Drive; Concord, New Hampshire
- Agency executive: William J. Cass, Commissioner
- Website: www.dot.nh.gov

The New Hampshire Department of Transportation (NHDOT) is a government agency of the U.S. state of New Hampshire. The Commissioner of NHDOT is William J. Cass. The main office of the NHDOT is located in the J. O. Morton Building in Concord.

== Functions ==
NHDOT's general functions, as provided in NH RSA:21-L, are:

- Planning, developing, and maintaining a state transportation network which will provide for safe and convenient movement of people and goods throughout the state by means of a system of highways and railroads, air service, mass transit and other practicable modes of transportation in order to support state growth and economic development and promote the general welfare of the citizens of the state.
- Developing and maintaining state owned land and buildings, except as otherwise provided by law, and cooperating with the New Hampshire Department of Administrative Services in preparing a long-range state capital improvements plan.
- Performing any regulation of transportation activities required by law which is not within the jurisdiction of another state agency.

NHDOT operates a 5-1-1 traveler information system online and by phone.

NHDOT shares responsibility with the New Hampshire Division of Historical Resources (DHR) for the New Hampshire historical markers program.

== History ==
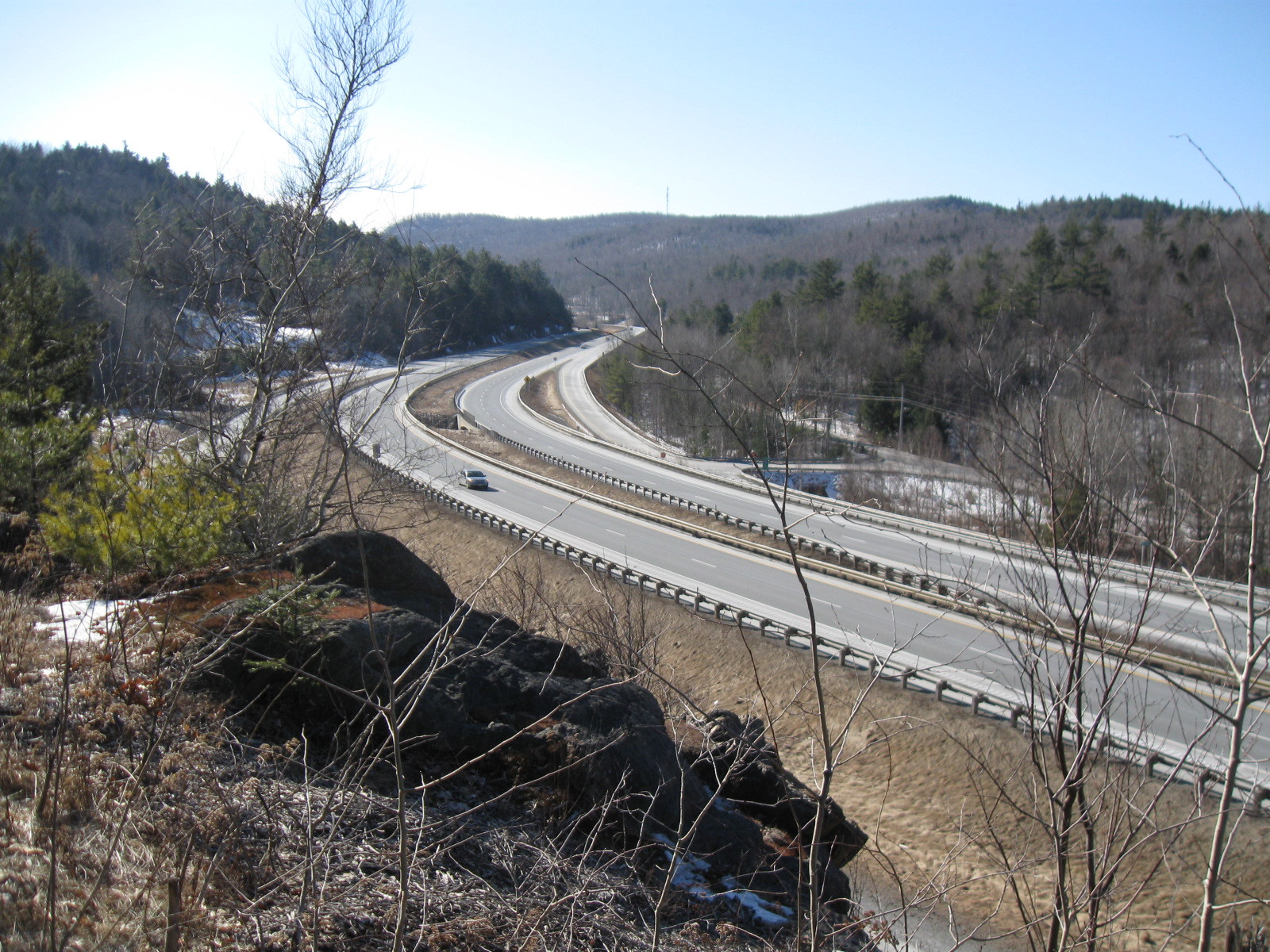
Interstate 89 at Exit 15 (Montcalm)

From 1905 to 1915, the responsibility for highways and bridges was vested with the State Engineer. From 1915 to 1950, the NHDOT was the "Division to the Highway Department", which was established under Chapter 103 of the New Hampshire Laws of 1915. In 1950, the department became the "New Hampshire Department of Public Works and Highways", established under Part 9 of Chapter 5 of the New Hampshire Laws of 1950.

On February 18, 1986, the Department of Public Works and Highways was reorganized under Chapter 402 of the laws of 1985 (RSA:21-L), as the Department of Transportation. This reorganization of the department added the Transportation Division of the Public Utilities Commission (Bureaus of Rail Safety and Common Carriers) and the Aeronautics Commission.

Additional agency reorganization under Chapter 257 of the New Hampshire Laws of 2004 changed the Division of Aeronautics to the Division of Aeronautics, Rail, and Transit.

== Divisions ==
Under the 1986 reorganization plan, five divisions were created within the department:

- Project Development: Plans and designs transportation projects and oversees their construction
- Operations: NHDOT's largest Division is responsible for the maintenance of state highways and bridges, and the maintenance and operation of the State's turnpike system
- Administration: Responsible for support activities in the Department, including accounting, auditing, purchasing, budgeting, contracts, information technology and the print shop
- Division of Aeronautics, Rail and Transit: Works with Federal, state and local agencies to preserve and promote various modes of transportation outside of the mode of automobile/truck and highways

=== New Hampshire Rail Transit Authority ===
The New Hampshire Rail Transit Authority (NHRTA) was a short lived administrative agency attached to the NHDOT which was created in 2007 to oversee the development of commuter rail and other passenger rail service in New Hampshire. The initial focus of the NHRTA was to provide oversight for the proposed Capitol Corridor intercity rail project (not to be confused with Amtrak's Capitol Corridor service in California), which would have connected Concord, New Hampshire, with Boston, Massachusetts, via Manchester and Nashua and the existing MBTA Commuter Rail Lowell Line, and also include a stop at Manchester-Boston Regional Airport.

Additional current projects of the NHRTA include the possible extension of the Haverhill MBTA Commuter Rail line to Plaistow, New Hampshire along the Coastal Corridor. Possible longer term projects include assessing the need and desire for passenger rail service elsewhere in the state, and updating the state Rail Plan with a vision for restored and improved passenger and freight rail service throughout New Hampshire and connecting to neighboring states. In April 2015, the Plaistow Board of Selectmen voted for the "no build" option to not extend commuter rail; this decision would preclude all future passenger rail extensions to the town.

The agency would prove to be extraneous; by 2010, constant political opposition and funding issues would hamper all NHRTA rail projects. By 2019 the group had ceased to meet, and their website URL had lapsed. By 2022, development on the Capitol Corridor project has largely stalled. Since then, the NHDOT Division of Aeronautics, Rail and Transit has overseen all rail projects within the state.

==== 2011 legislative repeal attempt ====
Following the 2010 election, some members of the New Hampshire General Court (the state legislature) began efforts to repeal the NHRTA. The new Republican majority in the House passed HB 218, an act to repeal the NHRTA, by a vote of 190-119 in March 2011. Following a promised veto by Governor John Lynch, a Democrat, and a committee recommendation to kill the bill, the Senate passed an amended version of HB 218 in May 2011. The amended bill would maintain the NHRTA, but drastically reduce its responsibilities and powers. Following a House vote to concur with the bill as amended by the Senate, Gov. Lynch vetoed HB 218 on June 15, 2011, citing support for the project from community and business leaders and the economic development that the project would generate. On January 4, 2012, the Governor's veto was sustained.

==== Capitol Corridor ====
The initial focus of the NHRTA has been on the proposed Capitol Corridor, which would connect Concord, New Hampshire, with Boston, Massachusetts, via Manchester and Nashua and the existing MBTA Commuter Rail Lowell Line, and would also include a stop at Manchester-Boston Regional Airport. The route would also be shared with a possible future high-speed rail line connecting Montreal and Boston. In October 2010, the NHRTA received grants in the amount of $2.24 million from the Federal Railroad Administration and $1.9 million from the Federal Transit Administration to study and plan the Capitol Corridor, marking the first time that the two federal agencies committed to work jointly on a planning grant. After the all-Republican Executive Council voted 3-2 against the rail feasibility study in 2012, the newly Democratic-led Council voted 4-1 to go forward with a $3.9 million New Hampshire Capitol Corridor Rail and Transit Alternatives Analysis on February 6, 2013.

The Granite State Poll, conducted by the UNH Survey Center from January 27-February 6, 2011, showed overwhelming support for the Capital Corridor project generally, and strong support from all areas of the state and across all political parties and ideologies. There is also strong support for the project among the business community in Nashua and Manchester, including the respective chambers of commerce and New Hampshire Businesses for Transportation and Infrastructure. Local elected officials of both parties have also expressed support for the project, including supportive resolutions by the town councils of Bedford and Merrimack, both largely Republican communities, and the Nashua Board of Aldermen.

At a public forum on March 5, 2014, the NHRTA presented preliminary results of the Capitol Corridor Rail and Transit Alternatives Analysis. Included in the presentation was the projection of up to 3,100 daily riders on the Capitol Corridor commuter or intercity rail line, which would mean that the line could top 800,000 passengers annually, compared to 560,000 on Amtrak's popular Downeaster. URS Corporation, the consultant conducting the study, predicted significantly lower ridership for an enhance bus-on-shoulder service, at 1,200 passengers daily. Costs for the bus service would be lower than for rail, but there would be substantially less economic development, according to the preliminary results. Annual operating costs for the rail option on the Capitol Corridor would be in the range of $8–10 million. The NHRTA identified various possible revenue streams, including public-private partnerships, to cover future operating costs. Rail service was projected to begin as early as 2020. Despite this, the project was never funded or approved. The Capital Corridor has since been considered on multiple occasions; however, planning has not progressed beyond conceptual studies.

== Regional planning ==
NHDOT shares planning authority with the following Metropolitan Planning Organizations and Regional Planning Commissions, which allocate federal funding:

- Central New Hampshire Regional Planning Commission
- Lakes Region Planning Commission
- Nashua Regional Planning Commission
- North Country Council
- Rockingham Planning Commission
- Southern New Hampshire Planning Commission
- Southwest Region Planning Commission
- Strafford Regional Planning Commission
- Upper Valley-Lake Sunapee Regional Planning Commission

== See also ==
- Commuter rail in North America (commuter rail systems by ridership)
- List of MBTA Commuter Rail stations
- List of rail transit systems in North America
- Light rail in North America
- North–South Rail Link, a two-mile tunnel to more easily allow the Amtrak Acela to extend from Washington, D.C. to northern New England states of New Hampshire or Maine
- Transit-oriented development
