= 1884 New Hampshire gubernatorial election =

- November 4, 1884
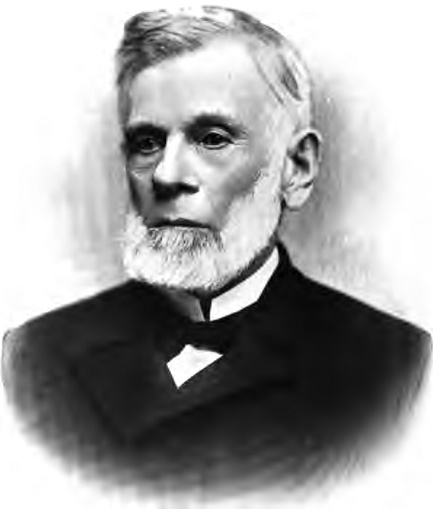

| Nominee | Moody Currier | John M. Hill |
| Party | Republican | Democratic |
| Popular vote | 42,514 | 39,637 |
| Percentage | 50.33% | 46.92% |
- County results Currier: 40–50% 50–60% Hill: 40–50% 50–60%
Governor before election
Samuel W. Hale
Republican
Elected Governor
Moody Currier
Republican

The 1884 New Hampshire gubernatorial election was held on November 4, 1884. Republican nominee Moody Currier defeated Democratic nominee John M. Hill with 50.33% of the vote.

== General election ==
=== Candidates ===
Major party candidates

- Moody Currier, Republican
- John M. Hill, Democratic

Other candidates

- Larkin D. Mason, Prohibition
- George Carpenter, Greenback

=== Results ===
1884 New Hampshire gubernatorial election
| Party | Candidate | Votes | % | ±% |
|---|---|---|---|---|
| Republican | Moody Currier | 42,514 | 50.33% | |
| Democratic | John M. Hill | 39,637 | 46.92% | |
| Prohibition | Larkin D. Mason | 1,803 | 2.13% | |
| Greenback | George Carpenter | 490 | 0.58% | |
| Majority | | 2,877 | | |
| Turnout | | | | |
| Republican hold | | Swing | | |
