= 1888 New Hampshire gubernatorial election =

- November 6, 1888
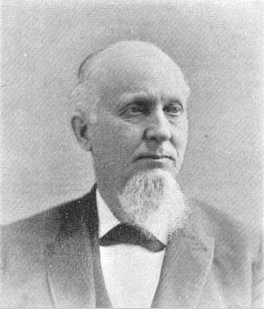

Nominee	David H. Goodell	Charles H. Amsden
Party	Republican	Democratic
Popular vote	44,809	44,217
Percentage	49.45%	48.79%
- Goodell: 40-50% 50–60% 60–70% 70–80% 80–90% Amsden: 40-50% 50–60% 60–70% 70–80% 80–90% >90% Tie: 40-50%
Governor before election
Charles H. Sawyer
Republican
Elected Governor
David H. Goodell
Republican

The 1888 New Hampshire gubernatorial election was held on November 6, 1888. Republican nominee David H. Goodell defeated Democratic nominee Charles H. Amsden with 49.45% of the vote.

== General election ==
=== Candidates ===
Major party candidates

- David H. Goodell, Republican
- Charles H. Amsden, Democratic

Other candidates

- Edgar L. Carr, Prohibition

=== Results ===
1888 New Hampshire gubernatorial election
Party	Candidate	Votes	%	±%
Republican	David H. Goodell	44,809	49.45%	
Democratic	Charles H. Amsden	44,217	48.79%	
Prohibition	Edgar L. Carr	1,567	1.73%	
Majority		592		
Turnout				
Republican hold		Swing		
