= Gov. John Butler Smith House =

Historic house in New Hampshire, United States

- U.S. National Register of Historic Places
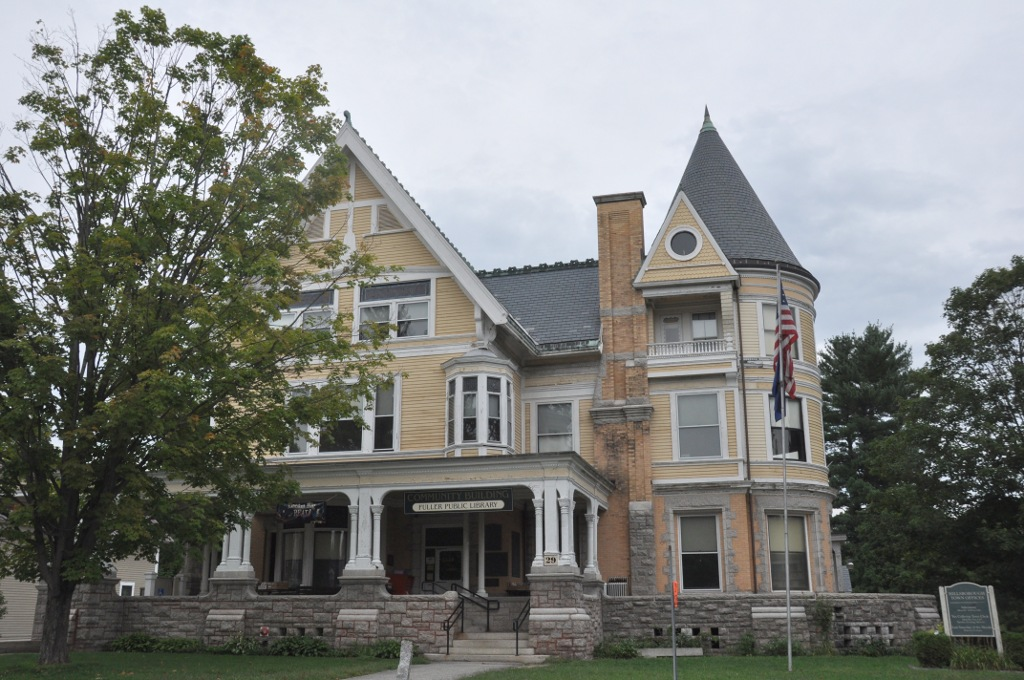

- Location within New Hampshire Location within the United States
- Location: 29 School St., Hillsborough, New Hampshire
- Coordinates: 43°6′59″N 71°53′47″W
- Area: 1.2 acres (0.49 ha)
- Built: 1866; 1892
- Built by: Edwin S. Foster (1892)
- Architect: William M. Butterfield (1892)
- Architectural style: Queen Anne
- NRHP reference No.: 02000959
- Added to NRHP: September 14, 2002

The Gov. John Butler Smith House, also now known as the Community Building, is a historic house at 29 School Street in Hillsborough, New Hampshire. The large Queen Anne Victorian is significant as one of few known residential works of a prolific New Hampshire architect, William M. Butterfield, and as the home of John Butler Smith, a principal owner of the local Contoocook Mills, who also served as governor of New Hampshire (1893–95). The building was listed on the National Register of Historic Places in 2002.

== Description and history ==
The Governor John Butler Smith House is located in the village center of Hillsborough, on the east side of School Street north of Myrtle Street. It is a rambling Victorian 2 1/2-story wood-frame structure, clad in brick with granite trim on the ground floor, and wooden clapboards and shingles on the upper levels. Dominant features include a circular turret with pyramidal roof at the right front corner, a large projecting gable on the left side, and a single-story porch across much of the front, supported by clustered columns. The interior, like the exterior, is lavishly appointed with woodwork. The property also includes a carriage house built in 1892.

This house began as a two-story Italianate structure built in 1866, which was extended with a mansard roof in 1885. Smith hired Butterfield to make major modifications in 1892, rotating the 1866 house and moving it back on the lot, and then adding the front section of the house, more than doubling its size. Smith's heirs donated the building to the town of Hillsborough, which has converted into town offices, library, and a community meeting space.

== See also ==
- National Register of Historic Places listings in Hillsborough County, New Hampshire
