= Governor Sawyer =

Governor Sawyer may refer to:

- Charles H. Sawyer (politician) (1840–1908), 41st Governor of New Hampshire
- Grant Sawyer (1918–1996), 21st Governor of Nevada
