= 1886 New Hampshire gubernatorial election =

- November 2, 1886
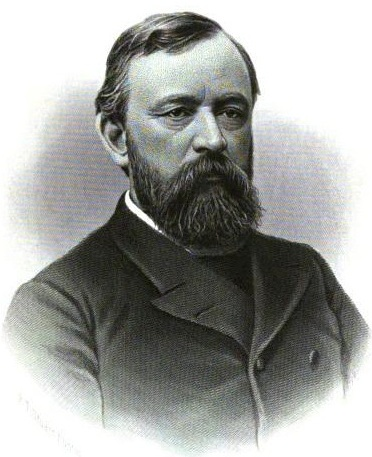

Nominee	Charles H. Sawyer	Thomas H. Cogswell
Party	Republican	Democratic
Popular vote	37,819	37,334
Percentage	48.86%	48.23%
- County results Sawyer: 40–50% 50–60% Cogswell: 40–50% 50–60%
Governor before election
Moody Currier
Republican
Elected Governor
Charles H. Sawyer
Republican

The 1886 New Hampshire gubernatorial election was held on November 2, 1886. Republican nominee Charles H. Sawyer defeated Democratic nominee Thomas H. Cogswell with 48.86% of the vote.

== General election ==
=== Candidates ===
Major party candidates

- Charles H. Sawyer, Republican
- Thomas H. Cogswell, Democratic

Other candidates

- Joseph Wentworth, Prohibition

=== Results ===
1886 New Hampshire gubernatorial election
Party	Candidate	Votes	%	±%
Republican	Charles H. Sawyer	37,819	48.86%	
Democratic	Thomas H. Cogswell	37,334	48.23%	
Prohibition	Joseph Wentworth	2,137	2.76%	
Majority		485		
Turnout				
Republican hold		Swing		
