= Hillsborough Railroad Bridge =

- U.S. National Register of Historic Places
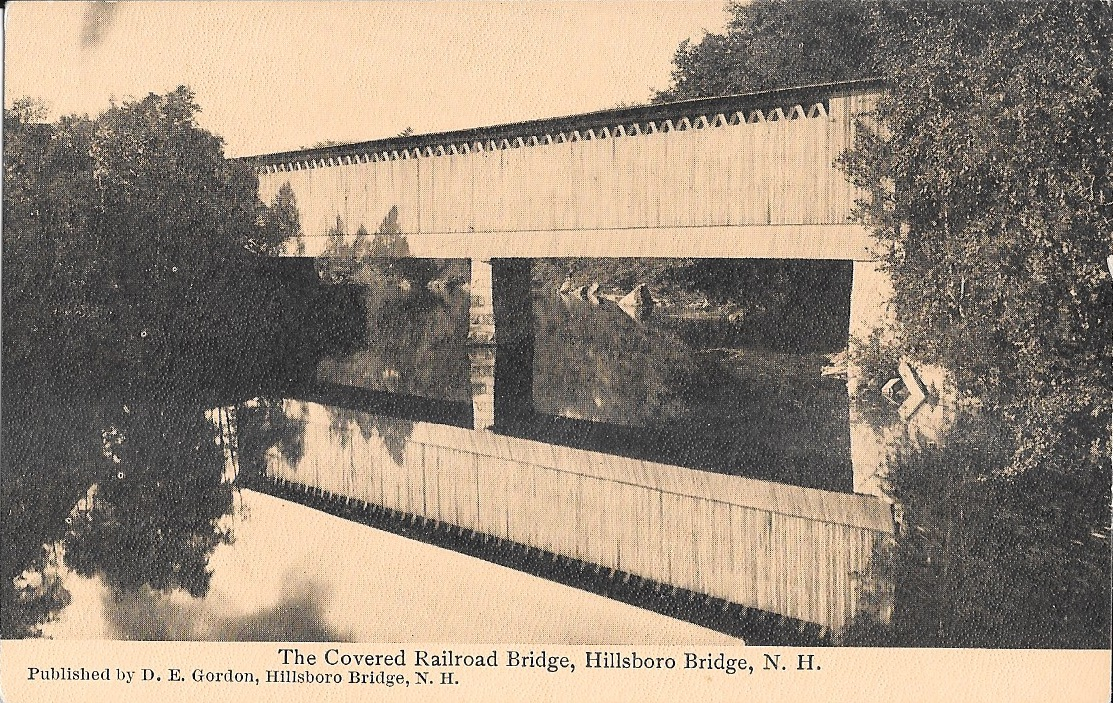
- The bridge as seen on a 1907 postcard

- Location within New Hampshire Location within the United States
- Location: Spanning Contoocook River SW of NH 149, Hillsborough, New Hampshire
- Coordinates: 43°6′48″N 71°53′44″W
- Area: 0.2 acres (0.081 ha)
- Built: 1903
- Architectural style: Town lattice truss
- NRHP reference No.: 75000126
- Added to NRHP: June 10, 1975

The Hillsborough Railroad Bridge was a historic covered railroad bridge spanning the Contoocook River in Hillsborough, New Hampshire. Built in 1903 by the Boston and Maine Railroad, it was destroyed by arson in 1985. The bridge was listed on the National Register of Historic Places in 1975. At the time of its nomination it was one of six covered railroad bridges in the state; it and at least one other (the Goffstown Covered Railroad Bridge) were destroyed by the actions of arsonists.

== Description and history ==
The bridge was located in the main village of Hillsborough, a short way west (upriver) of the road bridge carrying New Hampshire Route 149. The bridge was a two-span Town lattice truss span, mounted on granite abutments and a central wooden pier, the latter having replaced a granite pier washed away in 1938. It had a total length of 219 feet (67 m), with a gabled roof and exterior finished in vertical board siding. Although the bridge had two spans, the truss was a single element, running continuously across the central pier. Portions of the truss were reinforced by the placement of iron bolts, and there was a sidewalk cantilevered off one side.

The bridge was built in 1903 by the Boston and Maine Railroad (B&M), and was at least the second bridge on the site. The track leading to the bridge had been laid about 1878 by the Peterborough and Hillsborough Railroad Company, for service between Hillsborough and Peterborough. The company was not on good financial footing, and the line was soon taken over by the B&M.

The bridge was destroyed by a "fire of suspicious origin" that began around 11 p.m. on October 30, 1985.

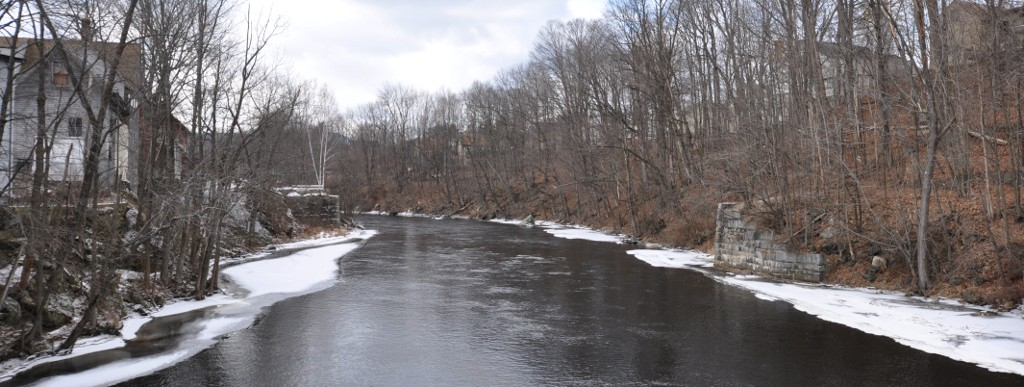
Only the bridge abutments survive today

== See also ==
- Contoocook River Railroad
- Contoocook Mills Industrial District, nearby
- List of New Hampshire covered bridges
- List of bridges on the National Register of Historic Places in New Hampshire
- National Register of Historic Places listings in Hillsborough County, New Hampshire
