= 1892 New Hampshire gubernatorial election =

- November 8, 1892
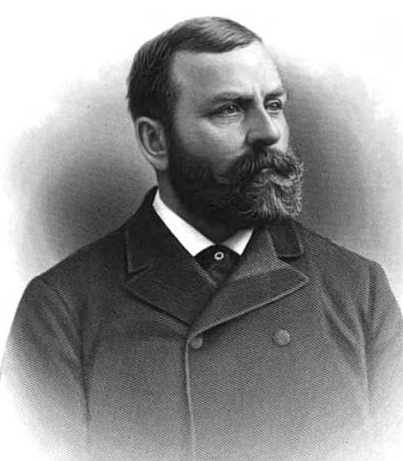

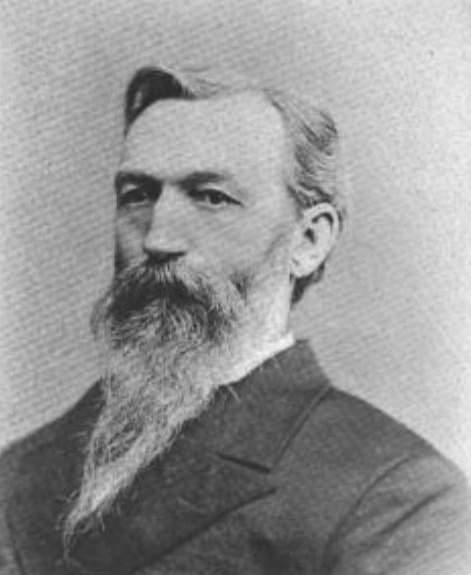
Nominee	John Butler Smith	Luther F. McKinney
Party	Republican	Democratic
Popular vote	43,676	41,501
Percentage	50.17%	47.67%
- Smith: 40-50% 50–60% 60–70% 70–80% 80–90% >90% McKinney: 40-50% 50–60% 60–70% 70–80% 80–90% >90%
Governor before election
Hiram A. Tuttle
Republican
Elected Governor
John Butler Smith
Republican

The 1892 New Hampshire gubernatorial election was held on November 8, 1892. Republican nominee John Butler Smith defeated Democratic nominee Luther F. McKinney with 50.17% of the vote.

== General election ==
=== Candidates ===
Major party candidates

- John Butler Smith, Republican
- Luther F. McKinney, Democratic

Other candidates

- Edgar L. Carr, Prohibition
- William O. Noyes, People's

=== Results ===
1892 New Hampshire gubernatorial election
Party	Candidate	Votes	%	±%
Republican	John Butler Smith	43,676	50.17%	
Democratic	Luther F. McKinney	41,501	47.67%	
Prohibition	Edgar L. Carr	1,563	1.80%	
Populist	William O. Noyes	318	0.37%	
Majority		2,175		
Turnout				
Republican hold		Swing		
