= Mara Superior =

American artist

Mara R. Superior
- Born: 1951 (age 74–75); New York City
- Education: University of Connecticut, University of Massachusetts Amherst
- Known for: Ceramics
- Website: marasuperior.com

Mara Superior (born 1951) is an American artist known for her work in ceramics. She attended the University of Connecticut and the University of Massachusetts Amherst.

== Collections ==
Her work is included in the collections of the Smithsonian American Art Museum, the Los Angeles County Museum of Art, the Everson Museum of Art and the Currier Museum of Art.
