= 1890 New Hampshire gubernatorial election =

- November 4, 1890
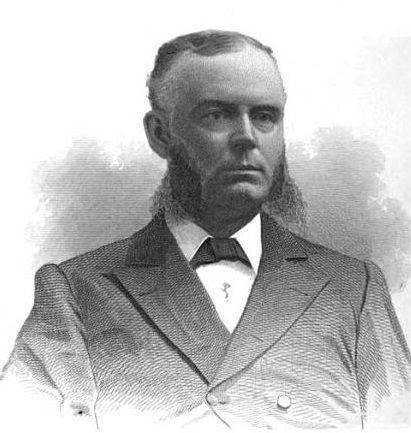

Nominee	Hiram A. Tuttle	Charles H. Amsden
Party	Republican	Democratic
Popular vote	42,479	42,386
Percentage	49.26%	49.15%
- Tuttle: 40-50% 50–60% 60–70% 70–80% 80–90% Amsden: 40-50% 50–60% 60–70% 70–80% 80–90% >90% Tie: 40-50% 50%
Governor before election
David H. Goodell
Republican
Elected Governor
Hiram A. Tuttle
Republican

The 1890 New Hampshire gubernatorial election was held on November 4, 1890. Republican nominee Hiram A. Tuttle defeated Democratic nominee Charles H. Amsden with 49.26% of the vote.

== General election ==
=== Candidates ===
Major party candidates

- Hiram A. Tuttle, Republican
- Charles H. Amsden, Democratic

Other candidates

- Josiah M. Fletcher, Prohibition

=== Results ===
1890 New Hampshire gubernatorial election
Party	Candidate	Votes	%	±%
Republican	Hiram A. Tuttle	42,479	49.26%	
Democratic	Charles H. Amsden	42,386	49.15%	
Prohibition	Josiah M. Fletcher	1,343	1.56%	
Majority		93		
Turnout				
Republican hold		Swing		
