= Maud Briggs Knowlton =

- Born: March 17, 1870
- Died: July 15, 1956 (aged 86)
- Known for: Watercolor painting
- Movement: Miniatures, watercolors

Maud Briggs Knowlton (March 17, 1870 – July 15, 1956) was an American watercolorist, still-life painter, art instructor, craftsperson, printmaker, and museum administrator. She and her friend Alice Swett were the first two women artists in the Monhegan Island artists' colony. She was the first director of the Currier Museum of Art.

Knowlton was a pupil of Rhoda Holmes Nicholls in New York, and she studied in Holland and Paris. She was a member of the Copley Society in 1900, Boston S.A. Crafts (now the Society of Arts and Crafts), and the New Hampshire League of Arts and Crafts. As an artist, her specialty was flowers and landscapes.

She was director of the Currier Museum of Art in Manchester, New Hampshire, from 1929 to 1946. At the time of its opening, the museum (then called the "Currier Art Gallery") had neither a collection large enough to fill the galleries nor an acquisition policy to guide the development of the collections. Knowlton wisely arranged a series of notable loan exhibitions from private and commercial sources until she and trustees determined how best to proceed. She is noted for saying, "One good canvas is worth a whole gallery of undistinguished paintings."

== Early life and education ==
Maud Ashley Briggs, the daughter of Henry C. & Louise M. (Morgan) Briggs, was born 17 March 1870 in the village of Penacook, in Concord, Merrimack County, New Hampshire. She was the younger of two children born to her parents, and the only daughter. Maud was educated in the Manchester (NH) public schools, including graduating from Manchester's Central High School in the class of 1888. This was followed by private instruction in art in Boston, New York, and Holland. The American Art Directory of 1910 states that she was a pupil of Rhoda Holmes Nicholls in New York, and that she studied in Holland and Paris.

== Marriage ==
Maud A. Briggs was married 21 June 1893 in Manchester to Edward T. Knowlton, son and fourth child of Joseph H. & Clara V. (Butler) Knowlton. He was born 31 July 1860 in Manchester. At the time of their marriage, his occupation was "Paymaster".

The Boston Daily Globe of Wednesday, June 21, 1893, reported the following wedding notice: "Knowlton-Briggs. MANCHESTER, N.H. June 20–This evening at 7 o'clock the marriage of Edward T. Knowlton and Miss Maud A. Briggs took place at the residence of the bride's parents, 58 Myrtle Street. The ceremony was performed by Rev. W. Ramsey of the Unitarian Church. Morton J. Fitch, a cousin of the bride, was best man, and Miss Mary F. Chandler was bridesmaid. After the ceremony a wedding lunch was served and a short reception held, after which Mr. and Mrs. Knowlton took the 5.37 train for Montreal. On their return they will reside at 58 Myrtle St., and will receive friends."

== Career ==
An accomplished artist and craftswoman, Knowlton was appointed to the Currier Gallery of Art Board of Trustees and tasked with researching art museum buildings in order to guide the design of the Currier's new building, which was designed by Edward L. Tilton in 1927. Knowlton was named first director of the Currier Gallery of Art (now Currier Museum of Art), serving until 1946, and was one of the first women museum administrators in the United States.

Knowlton was an instructor at the Manchester Institute of Arts and Sciences (now New Hampshire Institute of Art), and also later a director of its fine arts department. In 1930, she established the institute's educational program. That same year, she wrote an article about the Currier Gallery of Art that was published in the American Magazine of Art. In December 1933, Knowlton served on the Advisory Committee for the New England Public Works of Art Project. On March 19, 1936 (per the American Magazine of Art) Maud presented a broadcast over radio station WAAB, sponsored by the Boston Museum of Fine Arts in Boston, on "Arts and Crafts of New Hampshire".
