= Hillsborough (CDP), New Hampshire =

Census-designated place in New Hampshire, United States

Hillsborough, New Hampshire
- Census-designated place
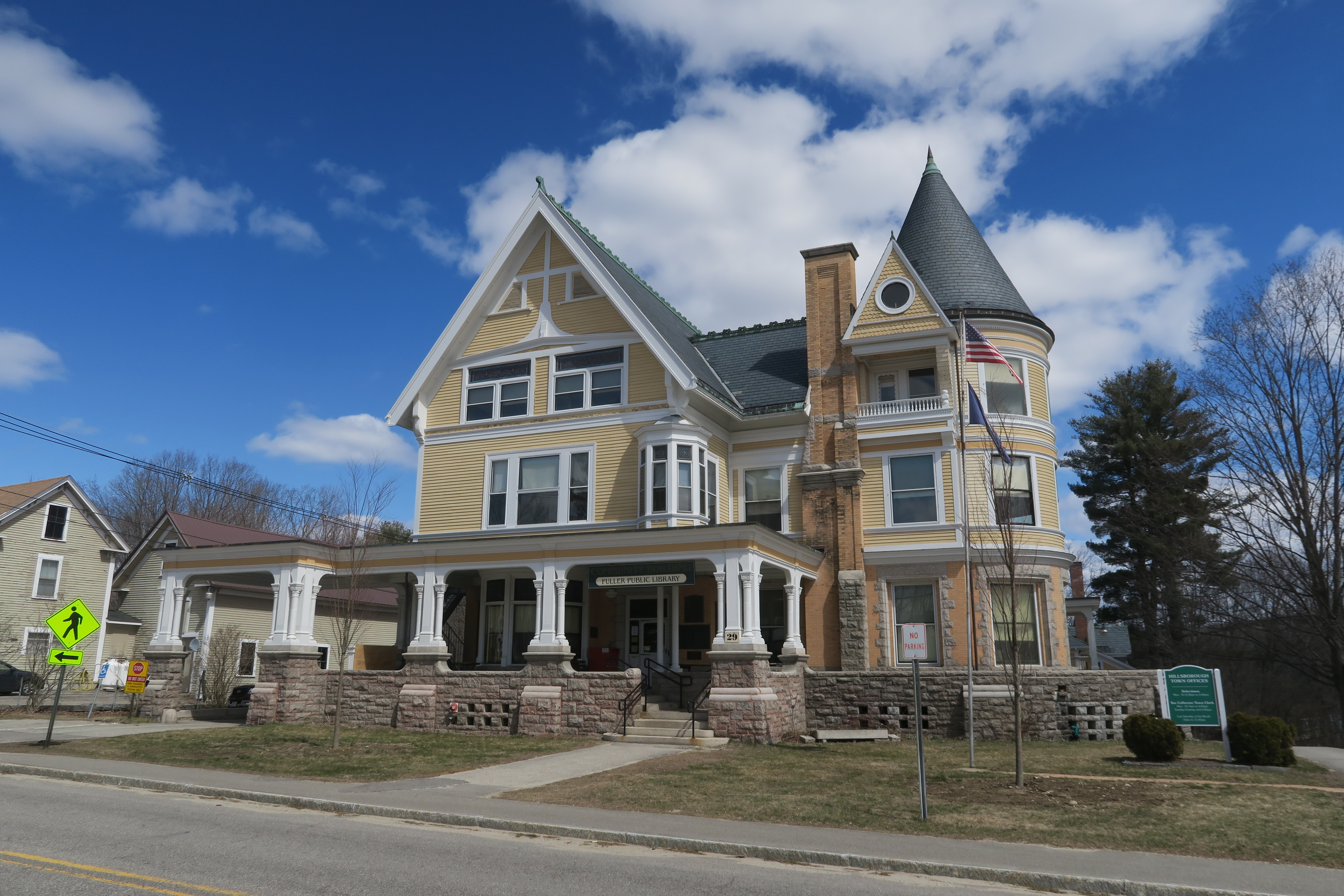
- Gov. John Butler Smith House

- Location within New Hampshire Location within the United States
- Coordinates: 43°6′50″N 71°53′44″W
- Country: United States
- State: New Hampshire
- County: Hillsborough
- Town: Hillsborough

Area
  - Total: 1.95 sq mi (5.04 km^{2})
  - Land: 1.95 sq mi (5.04 km^{2})
  - Water: 0 sq mi (0.00 km^{2})
- Elevation: 640 ft (200 m)

Population (2020)
  - Total: 2,156
  - Density: 1,107.9/sq mi (427.75/km^{2})
- Time zone: UTC-5 (Eastern (EST))
  - Summer (DST): UTC-4 (EDT)
- ZIP code: 03244
- Area code: 603
- FIPS code: 33-36020
- GNIS feature ID: 2378071

Hillsborough (frequently spelled Hillsboro) is a census-designated place (CDP) and the main village in the town of Hillsborough, New Hampshire, United States. The population of the CDP was 2,156 at the 2020 census, out of 5,939 in the entire town.

== Geography ==
The CDP is in the southeastern part of the town of Hillsborough, along the Contoocook River. The southern border of the CDP follows the town line with Deering. Parts of the eastern and southern borders follow the Contoocook River. The northern border is the Route 202/9 bypass, and the western border follows Route 202 and a power line in the valley of the North Branch of the Contoocook.

Routes 202 and 9 lead east from Hillsborough 22 miles (35 km) to Concord, the state capital. US 202 leads south 20 miles (32 km) to Peterborough, while NH 9 leads southwest 28 miles (45 km) to Keene. New Hampshire Route 149 passes through the center of the CDP, leading southeast 12 miles (19 km) to Weare.

According to the U.S. Census Bureau, the Hillsborough CDP has a total area of 1.9 square miles (5.0 km^{2}), all of it recorded as land.

== Demographics ==
Historical population
Census	Pop.	Note	%±
1950	1,670		—
1960	1,645		−1.5%
1970	1,784		8.4%
1980	1,797		0.7%
1990	1,826		1.6%
2000	1,842		0.9%
2010	1,976		7.3%
2020	2,156		9.1%
U.S. Decennial Census

As of the census of 2010, there were 1,976 people, 823 households, and 492 families residing in the CDP. There were 933 housing units, of which 110, or 11.8%, were vacant. The racial makeup of the CDP was 95.2% white, 0.7% African American, 0.3% Native American, 0.8% Asian, 0.1% Pacific Islander, 0.4% some other race, and 2.5% from two or more races. 1.7% of the population were Hispanic or Latino of any race.

Of the 823 households in the CDP, 33.8% had children under the age of 18 living with them, 36.3% were headed by married couples living together, 16.9% had a female householder with no husband present, and 40.2% were non-families. 31.3% of all households were made up of individuals, and 11.3% were someone living alone who was 65 years of age or older. The average household size was 2.40, and the average family size was 3.00.

25.5% of residents in the CDP were under the age of 18, 11.1% were from age 18 to 24, 25.3% were from 25 to 44, 25.9% were from 45 to 64, and 12.2% were 65 years of age or older. The median age was 35.0 years. For every 100 females, there were 94.1 males. For every 100 females age 18 and over, there were 92.3 males.

For the period 2011–15, the estimated median annual income for a household was $41,750, and the median income for a family was $75,526. Male full-time workers had a median income of $55,194 versus $33,203 for females. The per capita income for the CDP was $25,379.
