= 1882 New Hampshire gubernatorial election =

- November 7, 1882
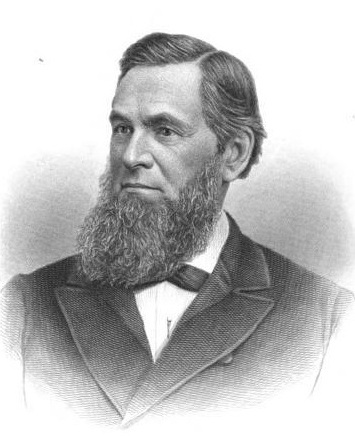

Nominee	Samuel W. Hale	Martin V. B. Edgerly
Party	Republican	Democratic
Popular vote	38,399	36,879
Percentage	50.36%	48.37%
- County results Hale: 50–60% Edgerly: 50–60%
Governor before election
Charles H. Bell
Republican
Elected Governor
Samuel W. Hale
Republican

The 1882 New Hampshire gubernatorial election was held on November 7, 1882. Republican nominee Samuel W. Hale defeated Democratic nominee Martin V. B. Edgerly with 50.36% of the vote.

== General election ==
=== Candidates ===
Major party candidates

- Samuel W. Hale, Republican
- Martin V. B. Edgerly, Democratic

Other candidates

- John Woodbury, Greenback
- Josiah M. Fletcher, Prohibition

=== Results ===
1882 New Hampshire gubernatorial election
Party	Candidate	Votes	%	±%
Republican	Samuel W. Hale	38,399	50.36%	
Democratic	Martin V. B. Edgerly	36,879	48.37%	
Greenback	John Woodbury	444	0.58%	
Prohibition	Josiah M. Fletcher	357	0.47%	
Majority		1,520		
Turnout				
Republican hold		Swing		
