= William Closson =

American painter

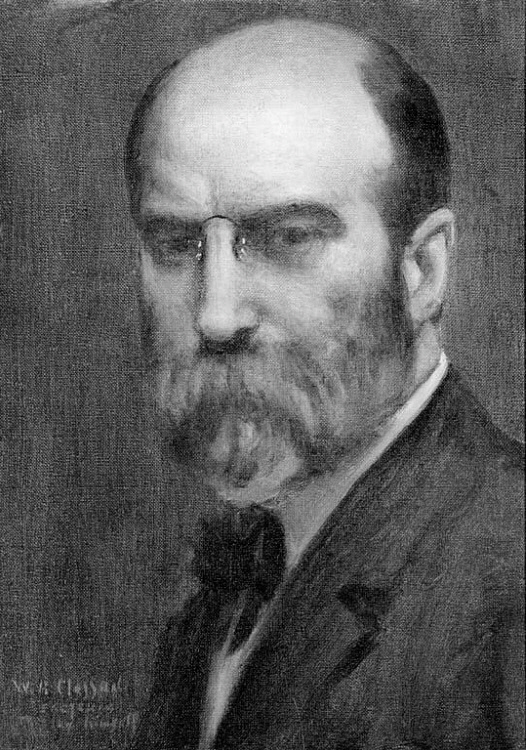
- Born: William Baxter Palmer Closson; October 13, 1848 Thetford, Vermont, United States
- Died: May 30, 1926 (aged 77); Hartford, Connecticut, United States
- Known for: painting, wood engravings

William Baxter Palmer Closson (October 13, 1848 - May 30, 1926) was an American artist.

== Biography ==
He was born in Thetford, Vermont, on October 13, 1848. His father David served as a Vermont legislator and his mother Abigail was a descendant of the painter Benjamin West.

As a young adult, he was educated at Thetford Academy before graduating and working as a clerk in a railroad office.

Soon, he moved to Boston, Massachusetts, and worked as an apprentice wood engraver with Samuel Smith Kilburn. He studied drawing at the Lowell Institute, then went on to work for Harper's Magazine and various publishing houses in Boston. While in Boston, he shared a studio with painter George Fuller.

Seventeen of his paintings are in the American Art collection at the Smithsonian Institution. He also has works on display at the Wadsworth Atheneum in Hartford and the Cleveland Museum of Art.

He married Grace Worden Gallaudet Kendall, daughter of Dr. Edward Miner Gallaudet, president of Gallaudet College in Washington, D.C.

He died on May 30, 1926, in Hartford, Connecticut, and is buried in the Gallaudet plot at Cedar Hill Cemetery.
