= Five Stone Arch Bridges, Hillsborough, New Hampshire =

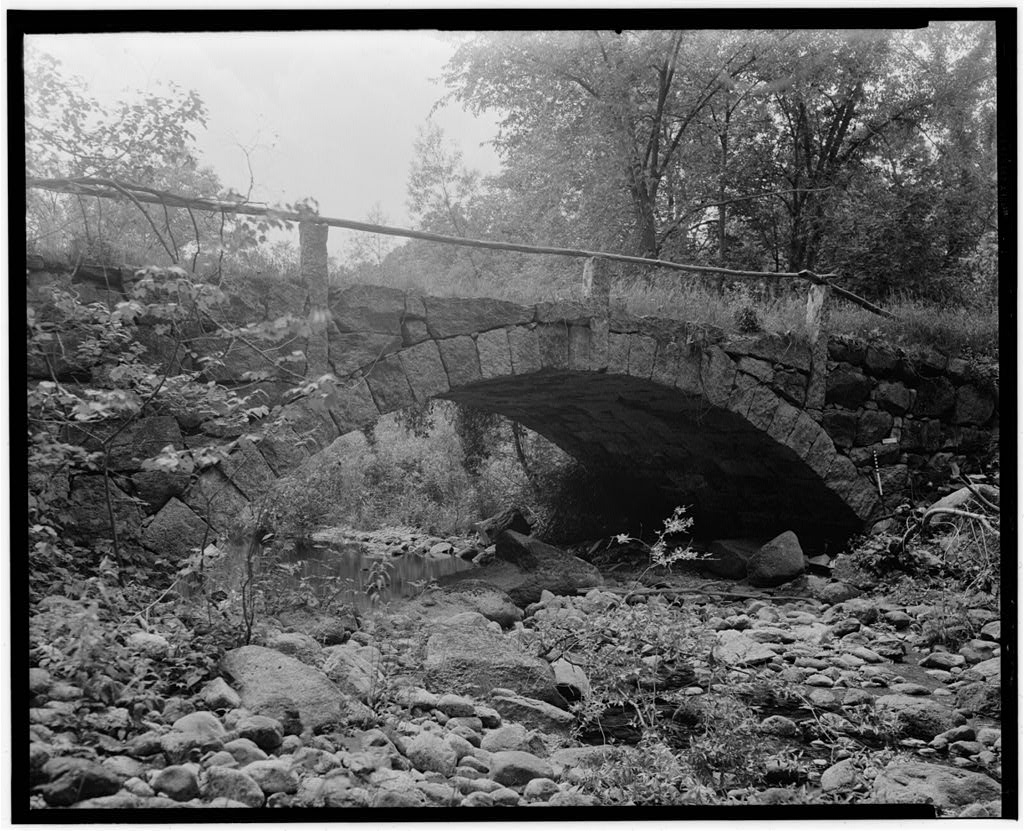
Second New Hampshire Turnpike Bridge in 1936

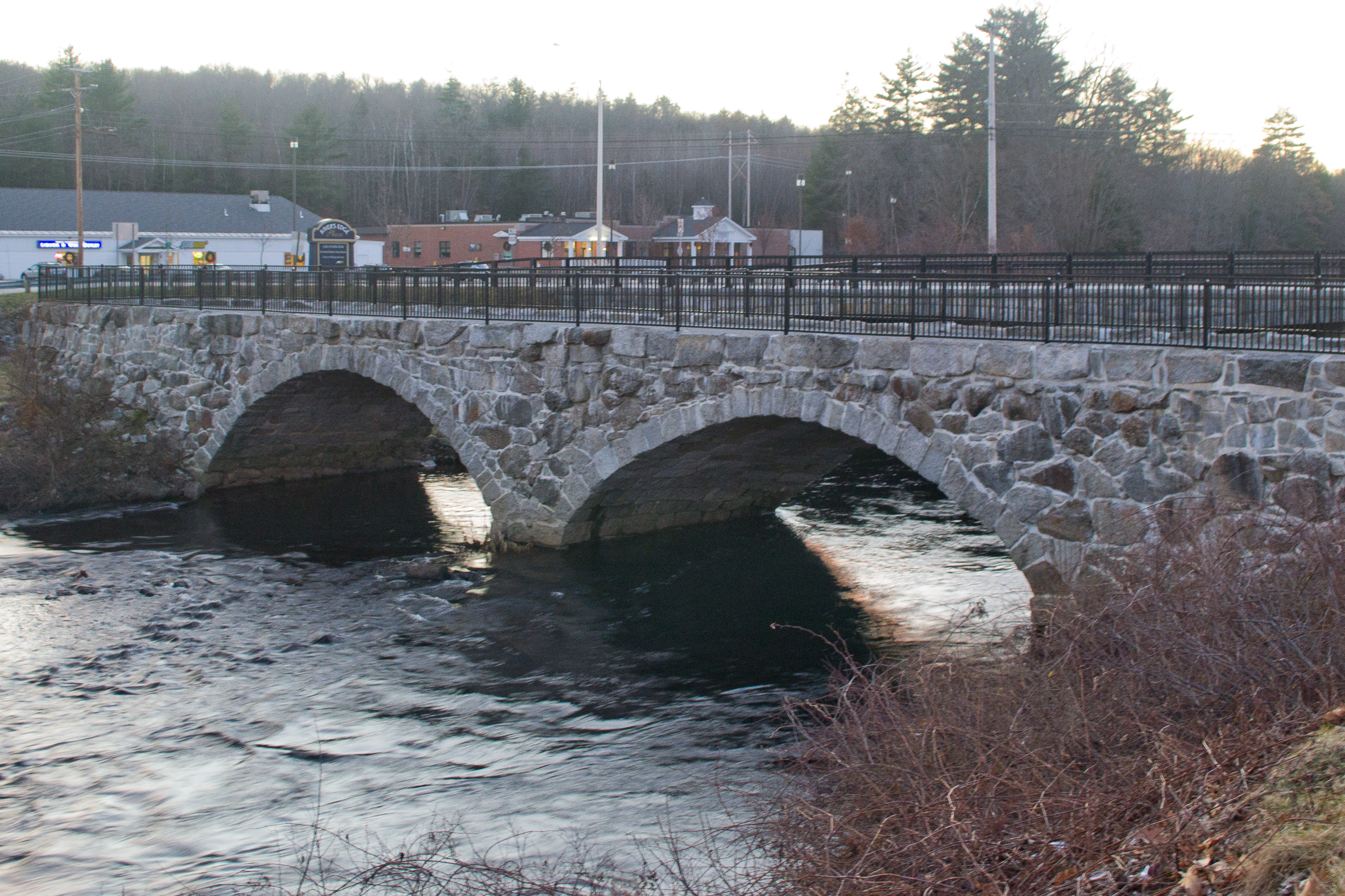
Sawyer Bridge in 2011

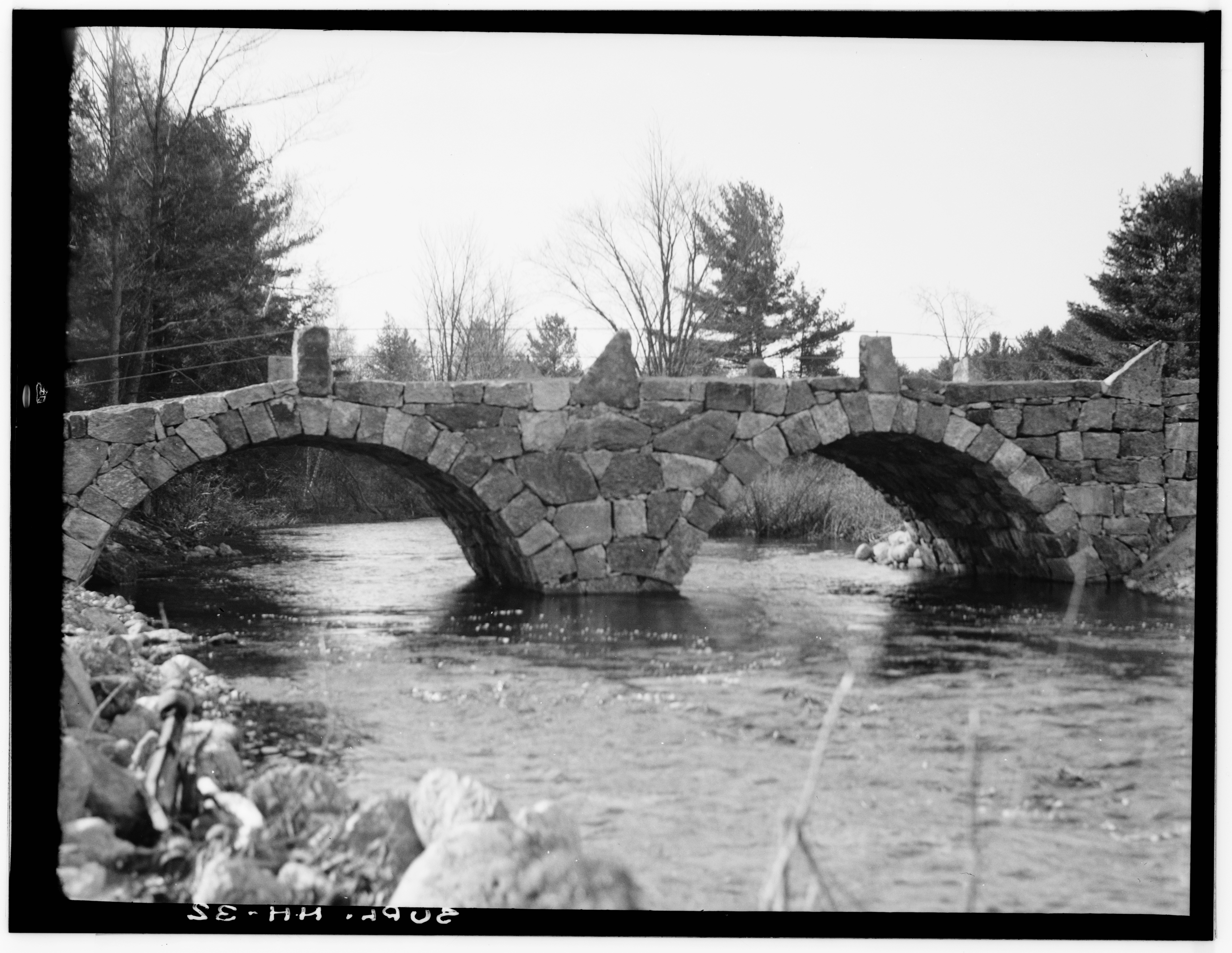
Carr Bridge in 1936

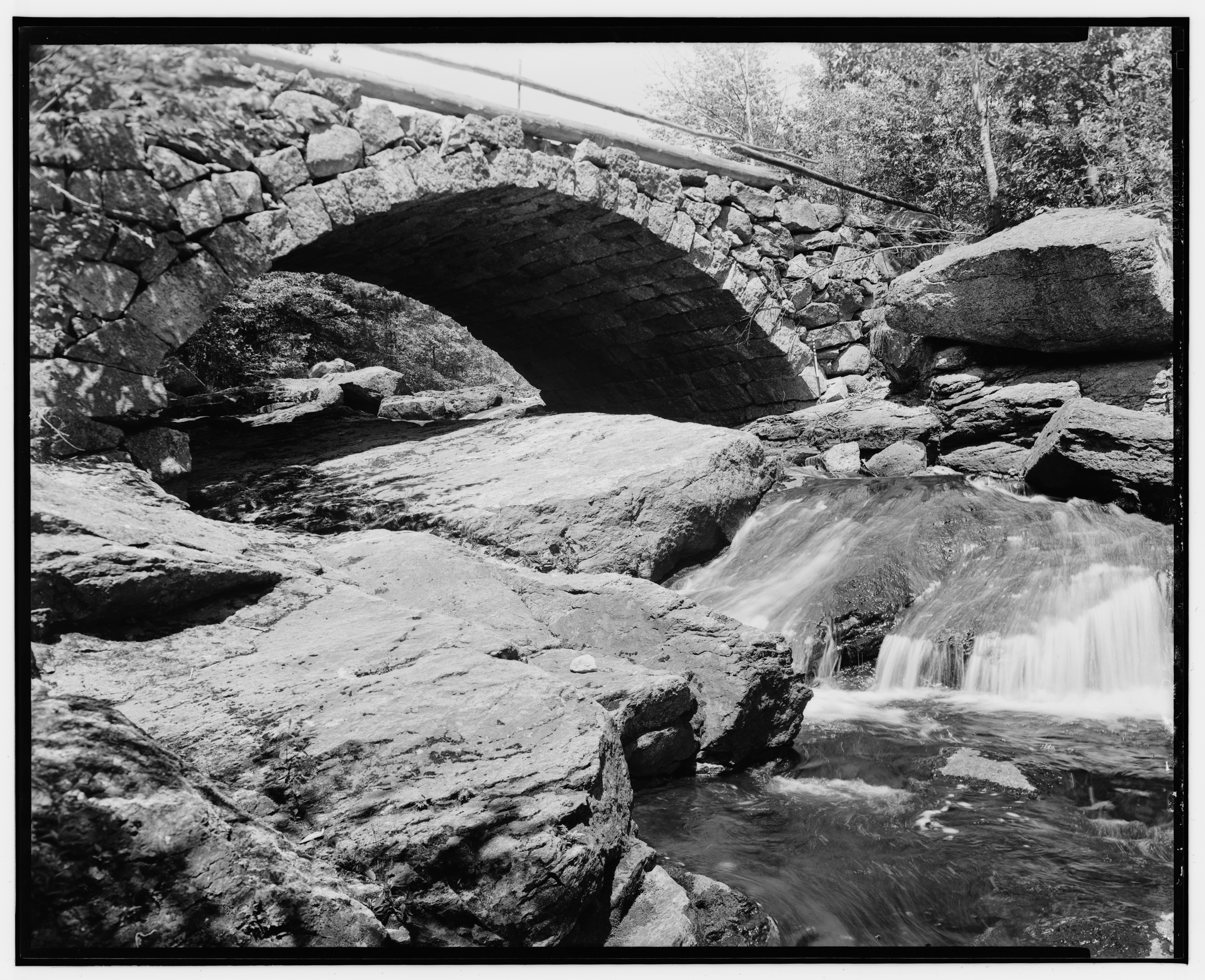
Gleason Falls Bridge in 1936

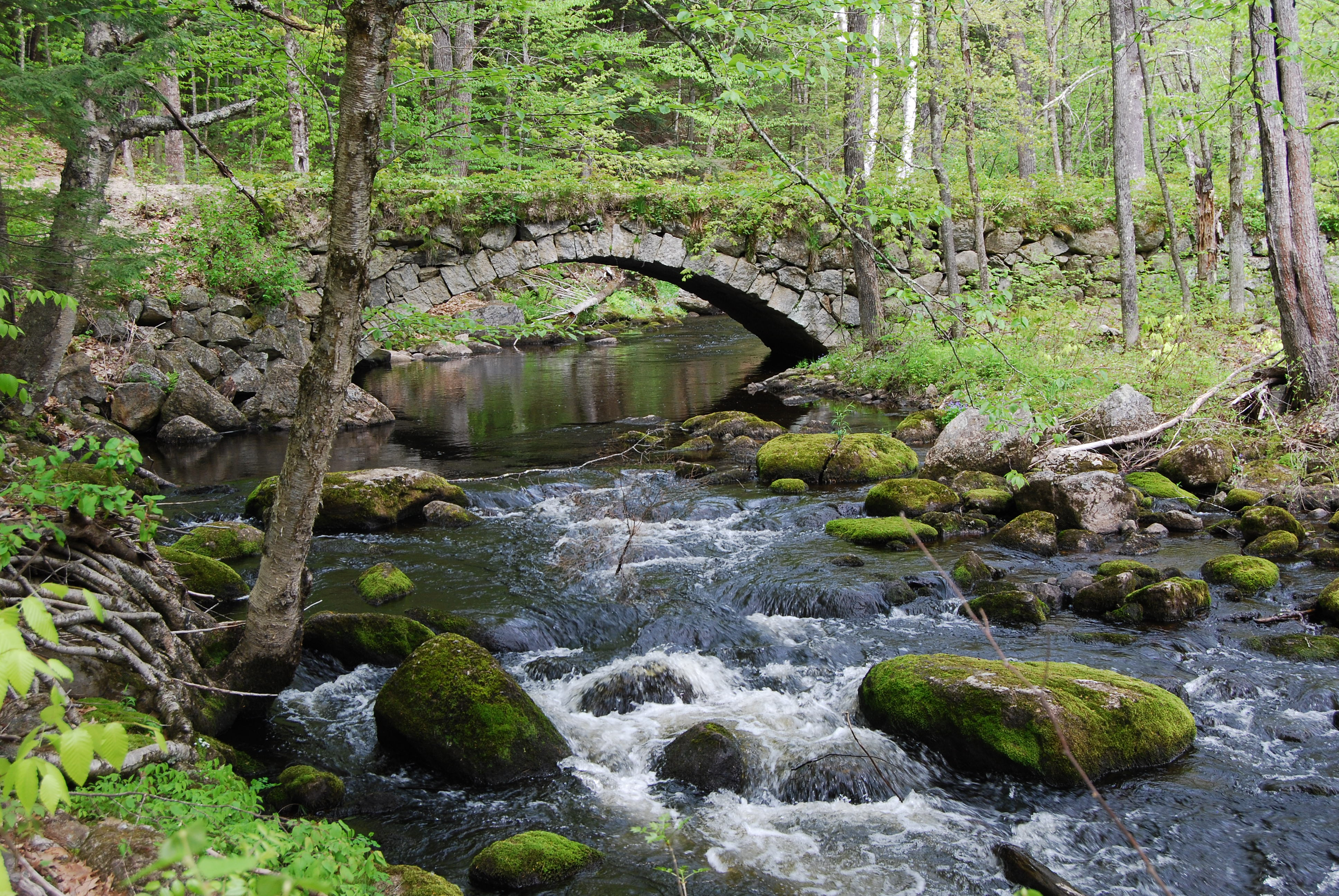
Gleason Falls Road Bridge in 2016

Five Stone Arch Bridges are a cluster of stone arch bridges in Hillsborough, New Hampshire, United States, that have been designated as a National Historic Civil Engineering Landmark by the American Society of Civil Engineers.

== History ==
The stone arch bridges were built in the 19th century, when there was a need for sturdier construction to replace weaker wooden bridges. The design required exceptional skill by stonecutters. Each stone had to fit just right. At one time there were twelve stone arch bridges in Hillsborough. The designation of the five remaining structures as a National Historic Civil Engineering Landmark by the American Society of Civil Engineers (ASCE) in 2002 had much to do with their close proximity to one another.

Fred Rhyner, a member of the ASCE New Hampshire Section and a vice president at Haley & Aldrich Engineering in Manchester, filed the nomination application for the historic landmark. His interest in the remarkable cluster of stone arch bridges began while working on a New Hampshire DOT bridge project on the Second New Hampshire Turnpike in 1996. It took three years to gather all the information together. The application was filed in 1999.

The Hillsborough town website states that the arch bridge near U.S. Route 202 (Sawyer Bridge) "is going to become the focal point of a public park," although it is unclear if there are active plans to do this. Selectman Robert Buker described the park surrounding the stone arch bridge at Route 202 as an attempt to balance commercial growth on the west end of town with historic preservation. A New Hampshire historical marker and an ASCE landmark plaque for the stone arch bridges are both located near Sawyer Bridge.

=== Bridges ===
Name	Coordinates	Built	Crosses
Carr Bridge	43°7′49″N 71°56′41″W	mid-1800s	Beards Brook
Gleason Falls Bridge	43°8′37″N 71°57′21″W	ca. 1830	Beards Brook
Gleason Falls Road over Beards Brook	43°8′42″N 71°57′34″W	mid-1800s	Beards Brook
Second New Hampshire Turnpike Bridge; Bridge at Fuller's Tannery	43°6′41″N 71°56′35″W	ca. 1864	North Branch River
Sawyer Bridge	43°6′41″N 71°55′08″W	ca. 1866	Contoocook River

== See also ==
- New Hampshire Historical Marker No. 203: Stone Arch Bridges
