= David H. Goodell =

American politician (1834–1915)

David Harvey Goodell
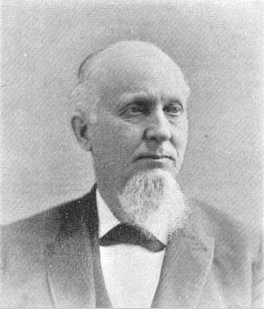

42nd Governor of New Hampshire
- In office June 6, 1889 – January 8, 1891
- Preceded by: Charles H. Sawyer
- Succeeded by: Hiram A. Tuttle

Member of the New Hampshire Governor's Council
- In office 1882–1882

Member of the New Hampshire House of Representatives from Antrim
- In office 1876–1878

Personal details
- Born: May 6, 1834 Hillsborough, New Hampshire
- Died: January 22, 1915 (aged 80) Antrim, New Hampshire
- Party: Republican
- Spouse: Hannah Jane Plummer (1835-1911)
- Children: Dura Dana Goodell (1858-1936); Richard Carter Goodell (1868-1942)
- Profession: American Inventor, Entrepreneur and Politician

David Harvey Goodell (May 6, 1834 – January 22, 1915) was an American inventor, manufacturer, and Republican politician from Antrim, New Hampshire.

Goodell was the son of Jesse Raymond Goodell (1807–1886) and Olive Atwood (Wright) Goodell (1807–1877).

== Family life ==
Goodell married Hannah Jane Plummer (1835–1911) of Goffstown, New Hampshire on September 1, 1857. They had two sons Dura Dana Goodell (1858–1936) and Richard Carter Goodell (1868–1942).

== Business career ==
In 1875 Goodell began and operated the Goodell company in Antrim. His company made knives and a collection of various cutting devices including apple peelers. His company was the largest employer with several mills spanning Great Brook.

== Political career ==
From 1876 to 1878 Goodell represented Antrim in the New Hampshire House of Representatives, and was member of the Governor's Council in 1882. In November 1888 he was elected as the Governor.

Goodell died in 1915 in Antrim.

== Notes ==
Party political offices
Preceded by Charles H. Sawyer	Republican nominee for Governor of New Hampshire; 1888	Succeeded by Hiram A. Tuttle
Political offices
Preceded by Charles H. Sawyer	Governor of New Hampshire; 1889–1891	Succeeded by Hiram A. Tuttle
