= Goffstown Covered Railroad Bridge =

- U.S. National Register of Historic Places
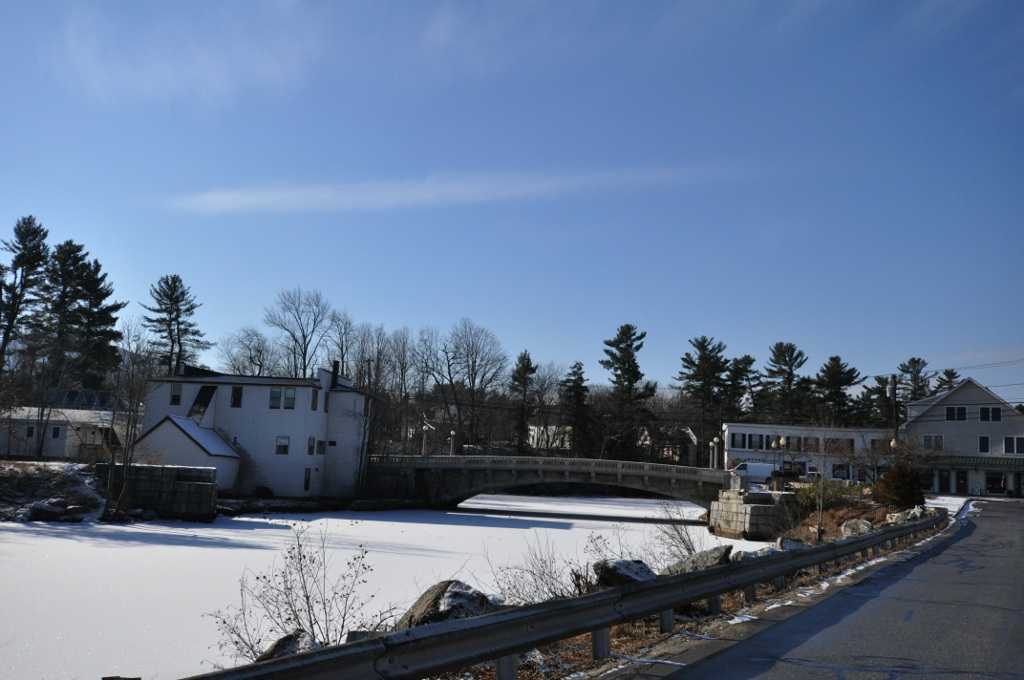
- The abutments to the former railroad bridge are visible in the foreground; the NH 114 bridge is behind them.

- Location within New Hampshire Location within the United States
- Location: Next to NH 114 (Main St.) over Piscataquog River, Goffstown, New Hampshire
- Coordinates: 43.018172°N 71.599145°W
- Area: 0.5 acres (0.20 ha)
- Built: 1901
- Built by: Boston & Maine Railroad
- Architectural style: Town-Pratt truss
- NRHP reference No.: 75000125
- Added to NRHP: June 18, 1975

The Goffstown Covered Railroad Bridge was a rare railroad covered bridge in Goffstown, New Hampshire. It was built in 1901 by the Boston and Maine Railroad, on the site of an earlier bridge built in 1850 by the New Hampshire Central Railroad, and carried its tracks across the Piscataquog River in the center of Goffstown. The bridge was listed on the National Register of Historic Places in 1975. It was destroyed by arson in 1976, as would later be the case with the Hillsborough Railroad Bridge in 1985.

== Description and history ==
The Goffstown Covered Railroad Bridge was located in the village center of Goffstown, just east of the bridge carrying New Hampshire Route 114 (Main Street) across the Piscataquog River. The bridge was oriented at an angle to the banks of the river, on granite slab abutments that are still visible, capped in concrete. The bridge was a single span truss structure with a clear span of 117 feet (36 m) and a total structure length of 129 feet (39 m). Its trusses were a combination of Town lattice trusses and Pratt trusses, with an integrated laminated arch. Portions of the trusses have iron reinforcements in the form of turnbuckles. The bridge had an inside horizontal clearance of 15 feet (4.6 m) and a vertical clearance of 21 feet (6.4 m). The railroad deck was supported by a web of timbers anchored into the trusses.

The first bridge on the site was built about 1850 by the New Hampshire Central Railroad. In 1895 the line came under control of the Boston and Maine Railroad, which built this bridge as a replacement in 1901. The line, which originally ran to Henniker, was abandoned to Goffstown (ending short of this bridge) in the 1930s, and was still in operation to that point when the bridge was listed on the National Register in 1975.

The bridge was destroyed by a deliberately set fire on August 16, 1976. Smoke from the fire could be seen as far as Manchester, 8 miles (13 km) away. Heat from the burning bridge was so intense that paint blistered on the fire engines parked nearby. At the time, the Boston & Maine Railroad was still serving two customers on the western side of the river, Kendall-Hadley Lumber and Merrimack Farmers Exchange. Despite this, the railroad decided not to replace the bridge. Freight service still ran on the line east of the river until September 20, 1980, with total abandonment following in February 1981.

== See also ==
- List of New Hampshire covered bridges
- List of bridges on the National Register of Historic Places in New Hampshire
- National Register of Historic Places listings in Hillsborough County, New Hampshire
