= Hannah Slade Currier =

American academic and socialite

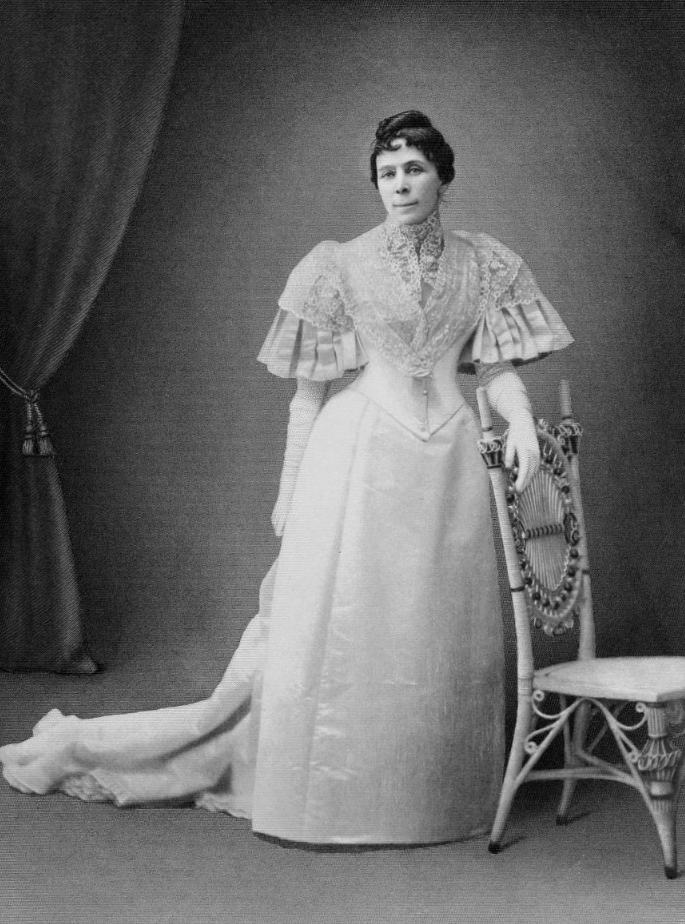
- Born: 1829
- Died: June 25, 1915 (aged 85–86); Manchester, New Hampshire, US
- Occupations: Academic, socialite
- Spouse: Moody Currier

Hannah Slade Currier (1829 – June 25, 1915) was an American academic and socialite.

== Biography ==
She was the youngest daughter of Enoch Slade of Thetford, Vermont, and sister of General Samuel W. Slade, a lawyer of St. Johnsbury. She received her early education in Thetford Academy, at that time one of the most famous institutions in New England. At this school, Miss Slade was one of the top students, both in ordinary studies, and also in the higher branches of Greek, Latin, and mathematics. After leaving the Academy, Slade went to Boston, where she continued her studies in music, French, and other branches of literature.

Miss Slade married Moody Currier, a banker in Manchester, New Hampshire, who was in 1885 and 1886 governor of the state. The accomplishments of Mrs. Currier added to the popularity of his administration.

After her marriage, she continued her literary and scientific pursuits, adopting the newest in research of her day. Although she has never given to the public any of her literary productions, her education and critical tastes would warrant success in such an undertaking.

Currier donated heavily to charities during her lifetime, usually doing so anonymously. Along with her husband, she founded the Currier Museum of Art. She believed that the proper sphere of woman is her home.

At the time of her death, Mrs. Currier was one of the wealthiest women in the State of New Hampshire.
