= Thetford Academy, Vermont =

School in Vermont, United States

Thetford Academy
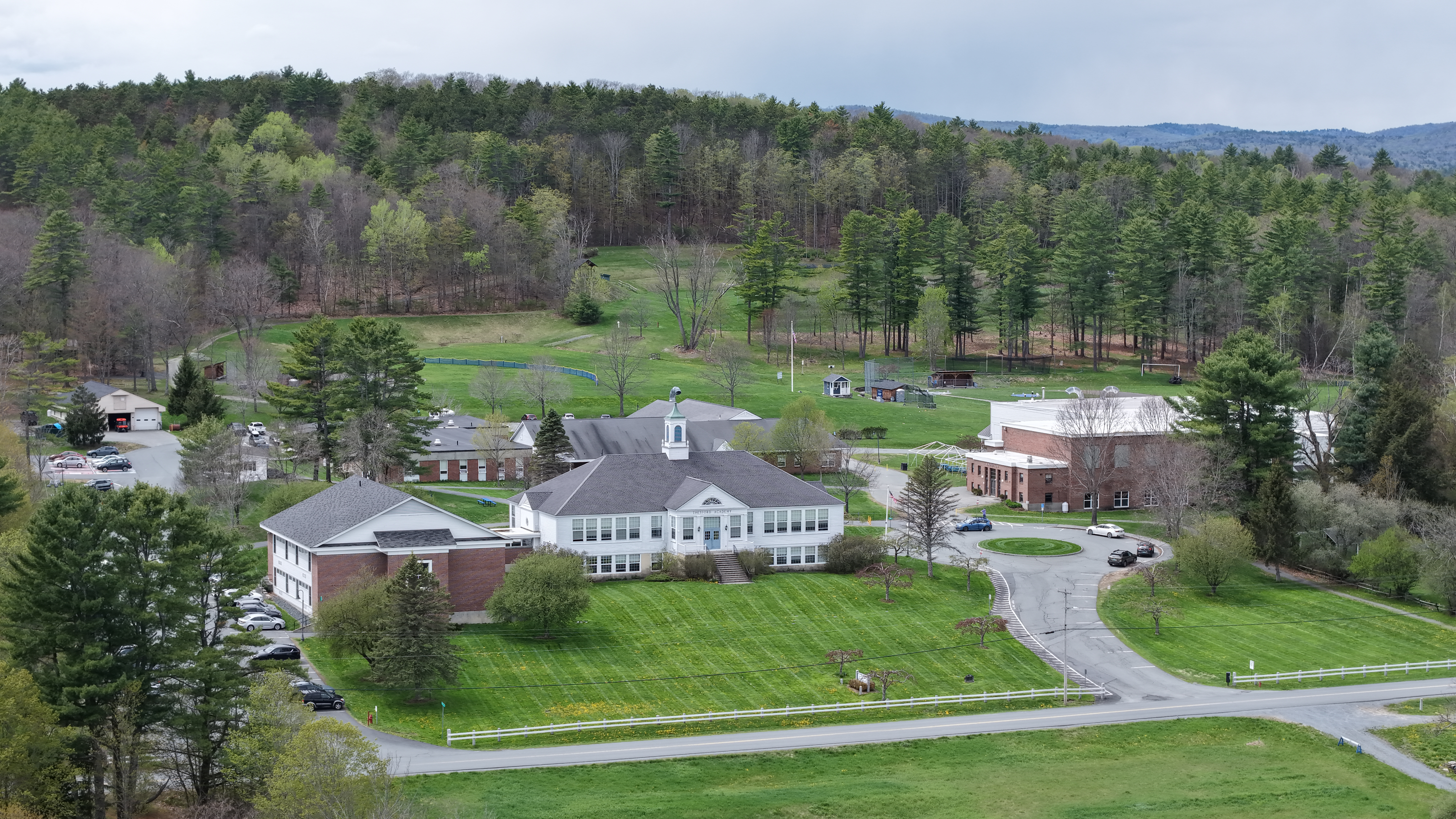
- Thetford Academy, Vermont, from the east

Location
- 304 Academy Rd; Thetford Center, Orange County, Vermont 05075; United States; 43.814514°N 72.2306461°W

Information
- School type: Independent
- Motto: An independent school with a public purpose
- Established: February 18, 1819
- Founders: Rev. Asa Burton, Judge Simeon Short, Jedediah Buckingham, Joseph Reed, William Heaton, Timothy Bartholomew, Thomas Kendrick, Elijah Hammond, Lyman Fitch
- School board: Board of trustees: Donna Steinberg, president (since 2021)
- School district: Orange East Supervisory Union (not directly controlled)
- Head of school: Carrie Brennan (since 2019)
- Employees: 116 (2019)
- Key people: 12 trustees (2019)
- Grades: 7–12
- Gender: Coeducational
- Enrollment: 312 (as of 2023)
- Classes: 100 (2023)
- Average class size: 14
- Schedule type: Four 85-minute blocks (eight 42-minute blocks for middle school students)
- Hours in school day: Six
- Colors: Blue, white
- Song: Thetford, We Revere Thee
- Mascot: Panther
- Accreditation: New England Association of Schools and Colleges (NEASC)
- Newspaper: Thetford Academy Times
- Yearbook: Tacadian
- Annual tuition: $22,430 (as of 2024)
- Revenue: $8,710,000
- Feeder schools: Corinth, Topsham, Strafford, Tunbridge, Chelsea, Sharon, Hartland, and Weathersfield
- Website: https://thetfordacademy.org/

Thetford Academy is a coeducational independent school in Thetford, Vermont, United States. Located at 304 Academy Road in Thetford Center, Vermont, it is the state's oldest secondary school. Thetford Academy celebrated its bicentennial year in 2018–2019. It is a tax-exempt non-profit institution under section 501(c)(3).

A historic New England Town Academy (one of approximately 20 remaining in Vermont, New Hampshire, Maine, and Connecticut), Thetford Academy serves as the designated public school for the town of Thetford. The academy also has partnership agreements with the town of Lyme, New Hampshire, and serves several towns that provide students a choice of high schools, or do not have a high school of their own. Thetford Academy also hosts a small contingent of international students from countries including China, South Korea, Greece, and Rwanda. In the 2022–2023 school year, Thetford Academy had 312 students enrolled in grades 7–12.

== History ==
19th-century woodcut depicting Thetford Academy's original building

Thetford Academy opened in February 1819, in keeping with a provision of the Constitution of Vermont that required towns to provide free elementary schools and each county to provide a school for post-elementary studies. From its founding, Thetford Academy admitted both boys and girls, and the original academy building included separate entrances for each. The school was an almost immediate success, and annual growth in the student body led to the rapid construction of new classrooms and dormitories.

The original 1818 academy building was lost in a fire in November 1942. High winds carried the fire to the rest of the campus, and the girls’ dormitory and library were also destroyed. Supporters moved quickly to rebuild the campus, an effort which began with the Colonial Revival schoolhouse now known as the White Building.

== Campus ==
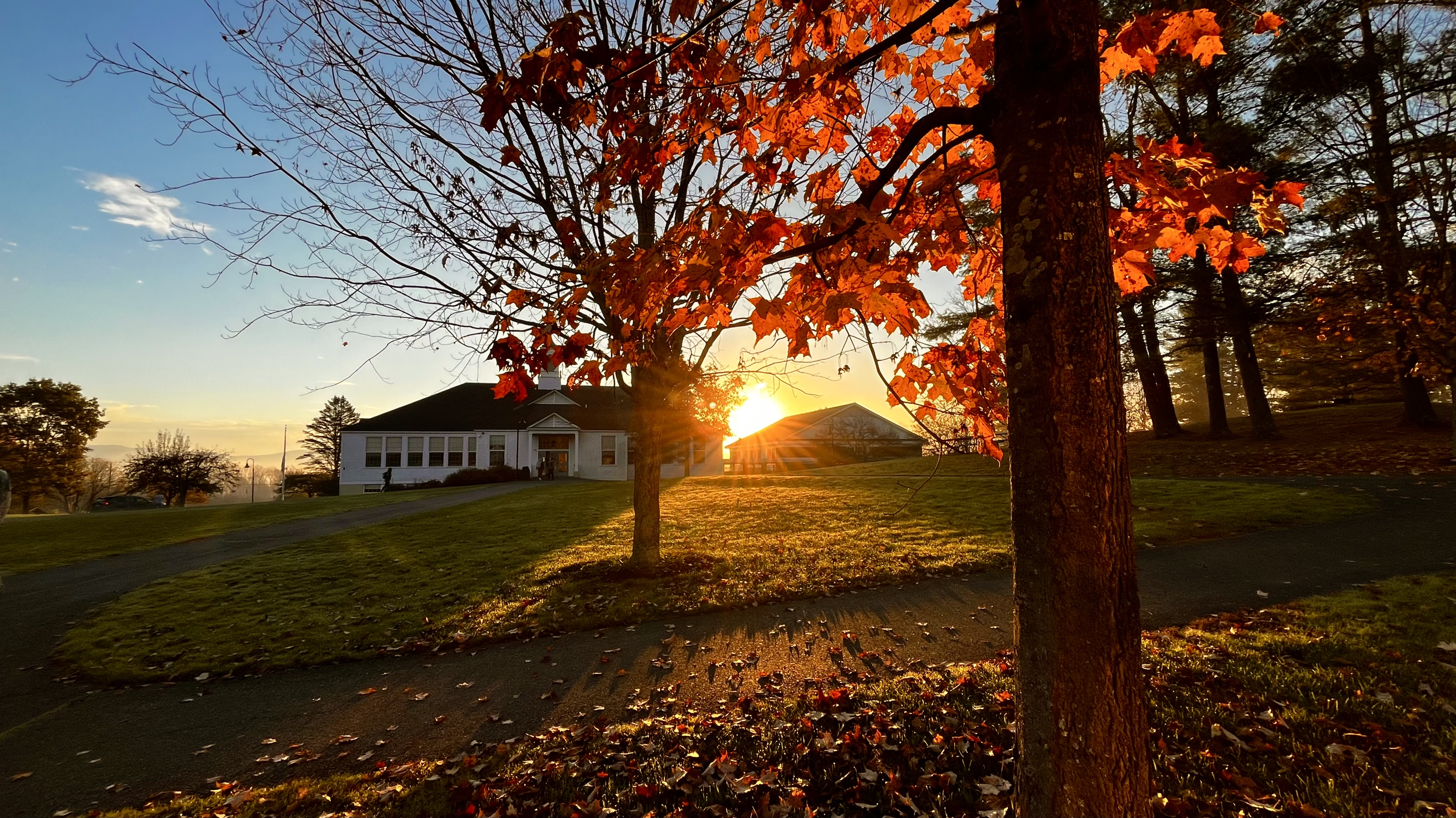
Thetford Academy’s white building and large section of campus

The school's campus spans 295 acres and includes several athletic fields, as well as a trail network that enables hiking, walking, running, mountain biking, and Nordic skiing. Thetford Academy is centered on a grassy quad, with its main buildings arrayed around it. These include the White Building and annex, Anderson Hall, the Vaughan Alumni Gymnasium, and the Arts and Sciences Building.

The academy completed a campus development project in 2010, which included new science labs, physical education and athletics team facilities, a theater of performing arts, and a greenhouse.

== Academics ==
Thetford Academy offers programs in Arts, Humanities, STEM, and Wellness. Its Unified Arts curriculum includes programs in visual arts, design technology, drama, music, and culinary arts. Its Humanities program includes courses in English, social studies, and world languages. Thetford Academy's STEM curriculum focuses on science, technology, engineering, and mathematics. The academy's Wellness program contains courses in physical education and health.

Some programs are aimed at grades seven and eight, some at grades ten to twelve, some grades eleven and twelve, and some grades nine to twelve.

== Student life ==
Thetford Academy encourages students to participate in extracurricular activities. Clubs and organized activities include art, bass fishing, gaming, gender equity, robotics, and the student council.

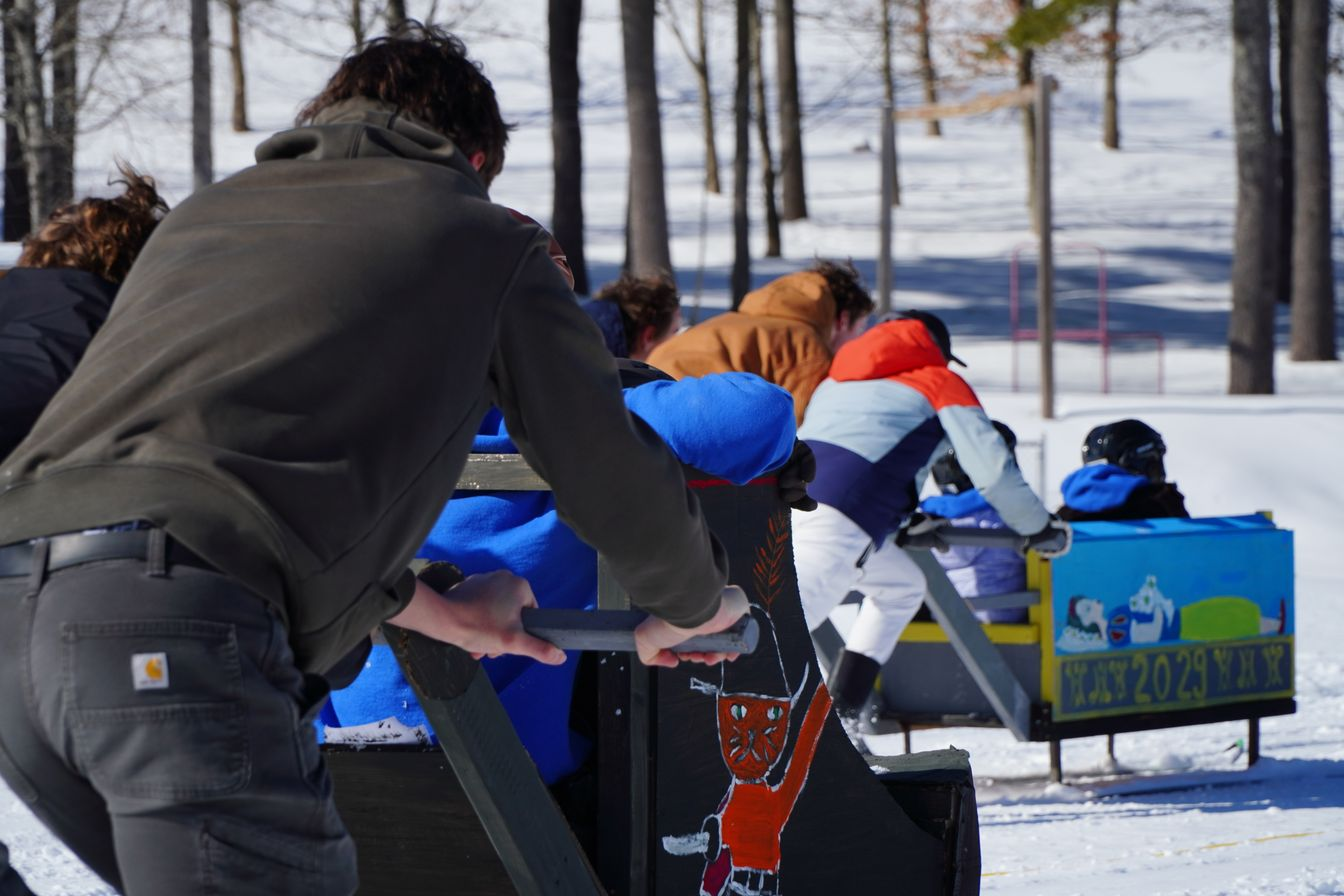
Grade levels compete against one another in a "float" race on Founders' Day.

The academy's advisory program includes faculty members providing advice and guidance to small groups of ten to twelve students. Advisors assist students in developing Personal Learning Plans (PLPs) and guide students to reflect on their academic growth and progress. Advisors also serve as liaisons between parents and guardians. Student groups bond by taking part in special projects and activities, as well as community service and initiatives.

Campus traditions at Thetford Academy include Founder's Day, which takes place in February of each year. Celebrations include a winter carnival, arts festival, games, and an all-school banquet. Additional activities include murals, costumes, snow sculptures, skits, banners, centerpieces, and decorated sled parade floats.

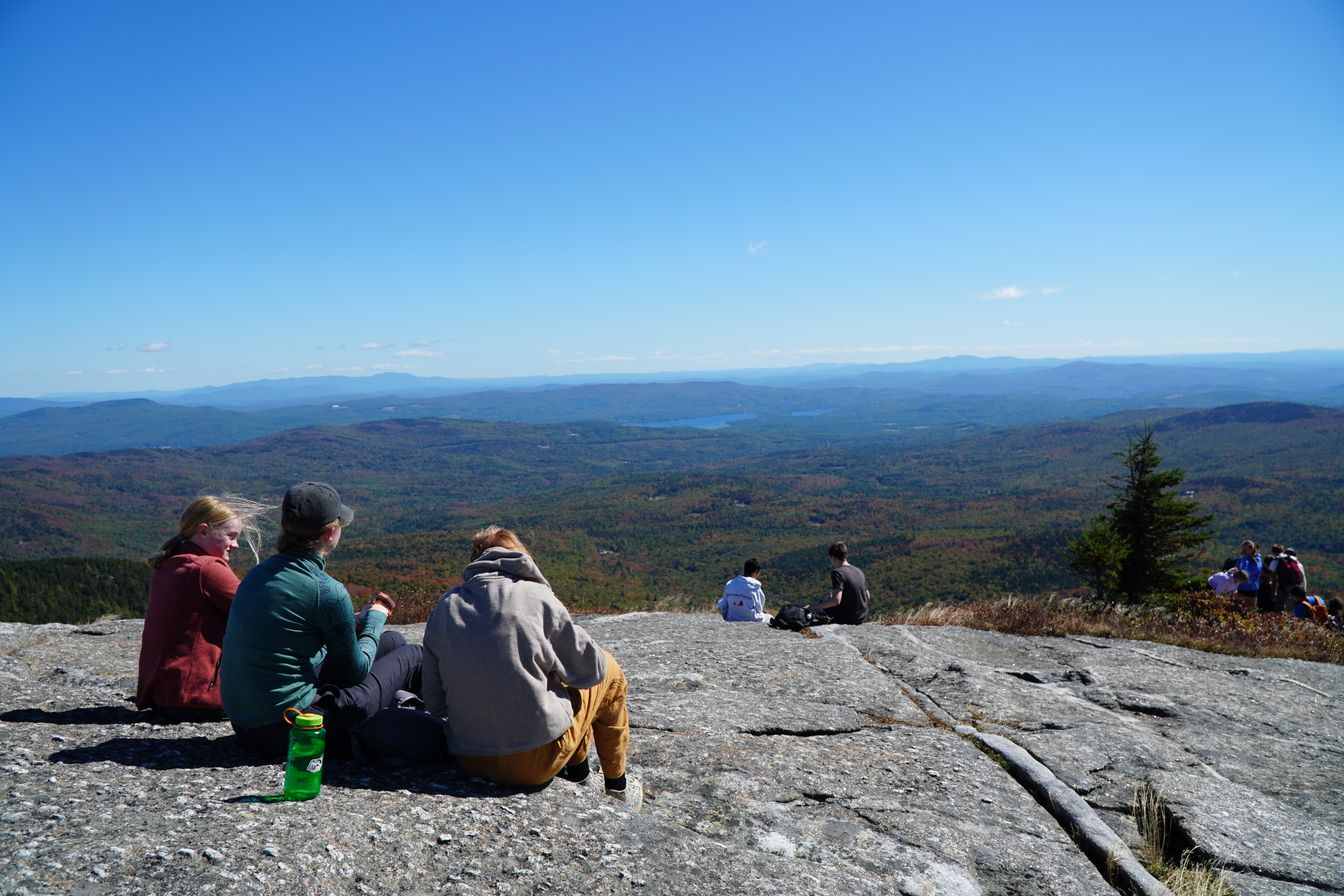
Students take a break after reaching the summit of Mt. Cardigan on Mountain Day.

In the 1970s, Thetford Academy began an annual "Mountain Day" tradition. Mountain Day encourages students to take part in outdoor activities. Events include students and faculty advisors taking part in hiking at nearby grade-specific mountains, so students who attend the academy from grades seven to twelve will have climbed all six mountains.

== Athletics ==
Thetford Academy is a Division III school and competes in most sports in the Northern Vermont Athletic Conference as a member of the Capital League. The school's athletic teams stress its five principles of excellence, commitment, caring, cooperation, and respect for diversity, and have won several awards for good sportsmanship. Thetford Academy's participation in interscholastic sports is regulated by the Vermont Principals’ Association, and include baseball, basketball, soccer, softball, cross country running, track and field, and alpine skiing. Thetford Academy serves as the annual host for the Vermont State High School Cross Country Championships each fall.

== Admissions ==
Tuition at Thetford Academy for the 2020–2021 school year was $19,965. "Sending towns" in Vermont and New Hampshire are towns without their own public schools, and they pay tuition for residents to attend schools in nearby towns. Thetford Academy's sending towns in Vermont include Corinth, Topsham, Strafford, Tunbridge, Chelsea, Sharon, Hartland, and Weathersfield. Thetford, Vermont and Lyme, New Hampshire also have sending agreements with Thetford Academy. The academy's tuition options also include private payment, scholarship programs, and financial aid programs.

== Notable alumni ==
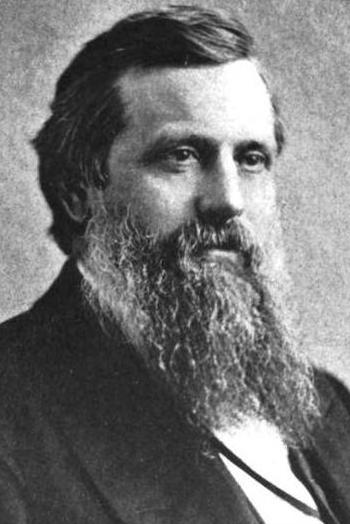
John Eaton, Union Army brevet brigadier general and U.S. commissioner of education

- Thomas Angell, pastor, educator at Bates College
- E. Florence Barker, president of the Woman's Relief Corps
- Thomas W. Bicknell, historian, educator
- Sherburne Wesley Burnham, astronomer
- William E. Chandler, U.S. senator, secretary of Navy
- Thomas Morris Chester, African American journalist, lawyer, and Union Army soldier
- William Closson, artist
- Hannah Slade Currier, educator
- George N. Dale, lieutenant governor of Vermont
- Ruth Dwyer, member of the Vermont House of Representatives and Republican nominee for governor in 1998 and 2000
- John Eaton, United States commissioner of education
- Ellen Frances Burpee Farr, painter
- Louise Woodworth Foss, elocutionist
- Charles Edward Hovey, Civil War general, first president of Illinois State University
- Mary Greenleaf Clement Leavitt, temperance movement missionary
- Anson S. Marshall, U.S. attorney for New Hampshire
- Justin Smith Morrill, U.S. senator
- George W. Morrison, U.S. representative
- John B. Sanborn, lawyer, politician, Civil War general, and negotiator of treaties with Plains tribes

== Sources ==
- Mary B. Slade, Thetford Academy's First Century: 1819-1919. Capital City Press, Montpelier, VT, 1956.
- Eaton, Gen. John. Thetford Academy, Thetford, Vermont: Seventy-Fifth Anniversary and Reunion, Thursday, June 28, 1894. Republican Press Association, Concord, NH, 1895.
- Fifty for 250: An Anthology of Thetford's History: 1761-2011. Thetford Historical Society, Thetford, VT, 2011.
