= Conant-Sawyer Cottage =

Historic house in Maine, United States

- U.S. National Register of Historic Places
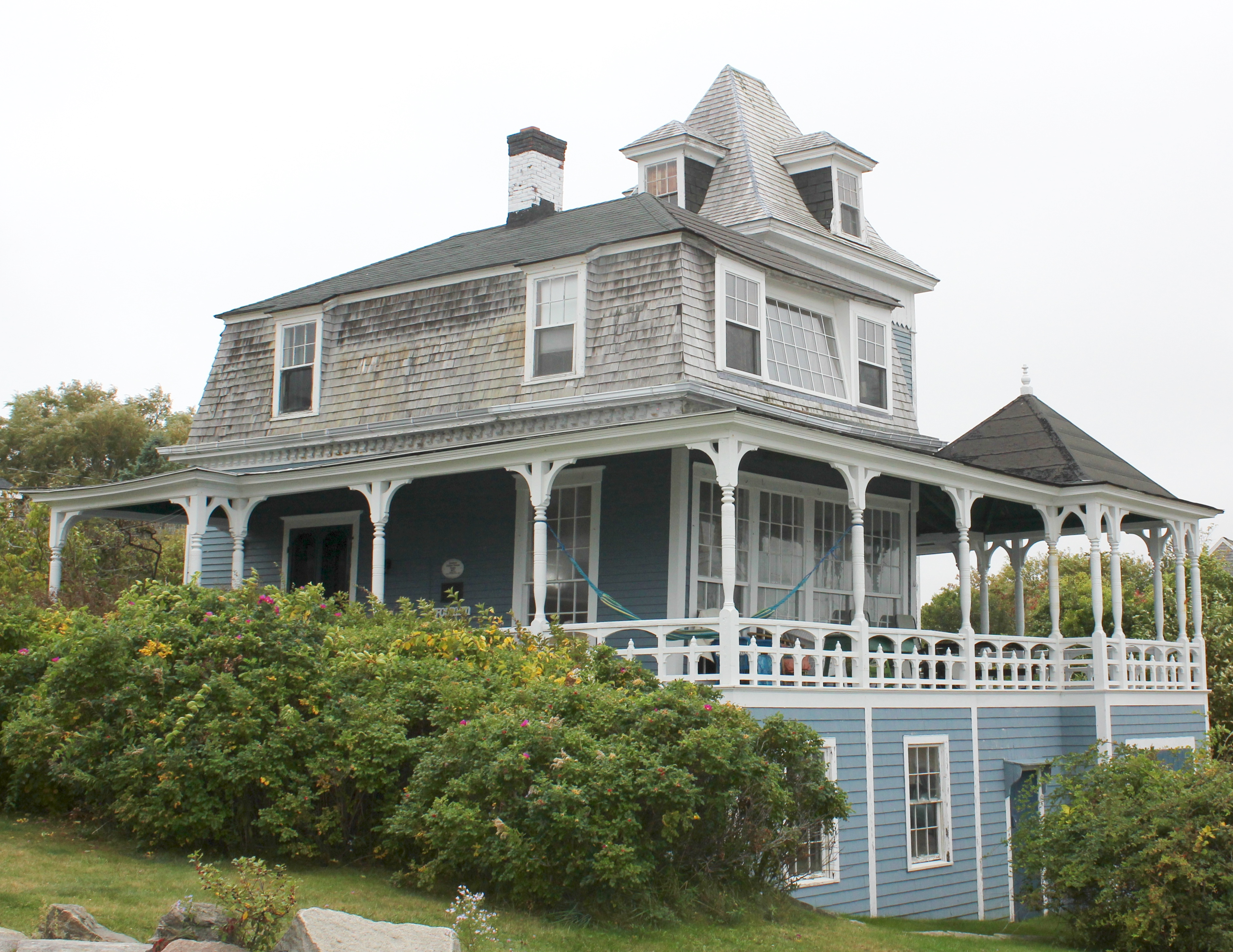

- Location within Maine Location within the United States
- Location: 14 Kendall Rd., York Beach, Maine
- Coordinates: 43°10′22″N 70°35′59″W
- Area: less than one acre
- Built: 1877
- Built by: Washington Paul Hayes
- Architectural style: Stick/eastlake
- NRHP reference No.: 92000279
- Added to NRHP: March 26, 1992

The Conant-Sawyer House is a historic summer house at 14 Kendall Road in York Beach, Maine. Built in 1877 and enlarged in 1896, it is a well-preserved example of a late 19th-century upper middle-class summer house. Its notable owners include Sumner Wallace, a shoe manufacturer from Rochester, New Hampshire, and Charles Henry Sawyer, Governor of New Hampshire. The house was listed on the National Register of Historic Places in 1992.

== Description and history ==
The Conant-Sawyer Cottage is set on the north side of Nubble Point, near the junction of Kendall Road and Ocean Avenue Extension. Facing north, it is a 1 1/2-story wood-frame structure, with a mansard roof, clapboard siding, and a modern concrete foundation. It is essentially L-shaped, with a 2 1/2-story tower at the crook of the L, and a porch that wraps around the east and north sides, and on the west side to the tower. The porch has a decorative balustrade, turned posts with brackets, and a projecting section at the northwest corner which is topped by a shallow pyramidal roof. The interior retains a significant amount of original woodwork.

The cottage was built in 1877-78 by a New Hampshire contractor, possibly on speculation, as he sold it soon afterward to Dr. Josiah Conant of Somersworth, New Hampshire. The next owner was Charles Henry Sawyer, a businessman from Dover, New Hampshire who also served as that state's governor 1887–89. Under Sawyer's ownership the building was enlarged in 1896, adding the kitchen wing behind the tower. Continuing the trend of ownership by New Hampshire businessmen and professionals, a subsequent owner was Sumner Wallace, who owned a shoe factory in Rochester. During Wallace's ownership the building was moved to its present location from one on the bluffs. The area where the cottage stands was known as "Concordville" from early in its development as a middle-class resort area, due to the large number of New Hampshire vacationers. Most of the houses from the same period in the area have been substantially altered.

== See also ==
- National Register of Historic Places listings in York County, Maine
