= Currier Museum of Art =

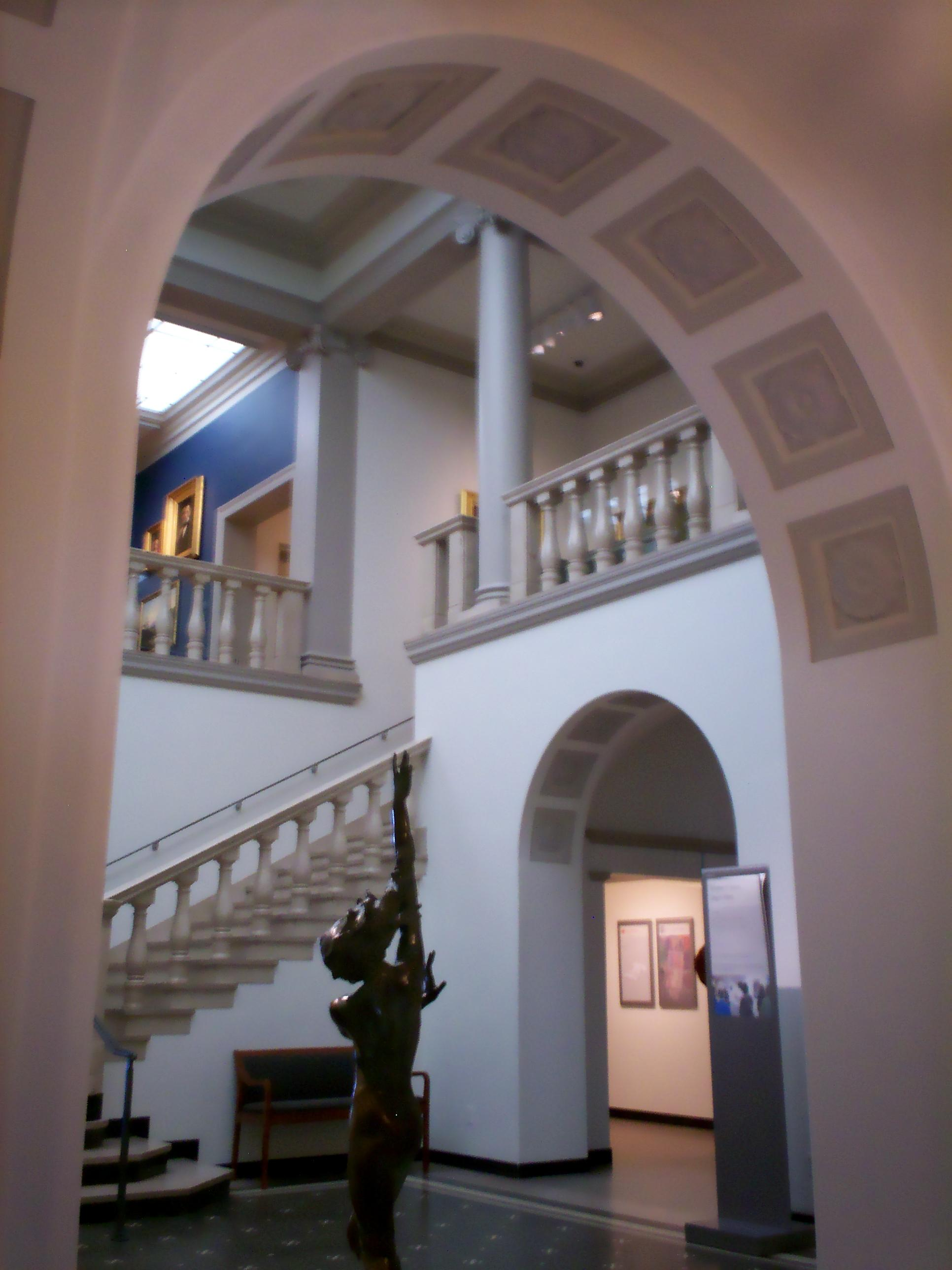
- Established: 1929
- Location: 150 Ash Street Manchester, New Hampshire
- Coordinates: 42°59′52″N 71°27′21″W
- Type: Art museum
- Director: Jordana Pomeroy
- Website: www.currier.org
- Currier Gallery of Art
- U.S. National Register of Historic Places
- Architect: Tilton & Githens; Salvator Lascari
- Architectural style: Renaissance Revival
- NRHP reference No.: 79000199
- Added to NRHP: December 19, 1979

The Currier Museum of Art is an art museum in Manchester, New Hampshire, in the United States. It features European and American paintings, decorative arts, photographs and sculpture. The permanent collection includes works by Picasso, Matisse, Monet, O'Keeffe, Calder, Scheier and Goldsmith, John Singer Sargent, Frank Lloyd Wright, and Andrew Wyeth. Public programs include tours, live classical music and "Family Days" which include activities for all ages.

The museum maintains two house museums, the Zimmerman House and the Toufic H. Kalil House, both designed by notable architect Frank Lloyd Wright.

== History ==
The museum, originally known as the Currier Gallery of Art, was founded in 1929 from a bequest of former New Hampshire Governor Moody Currier and his third wife, Hannah Slade Currier.

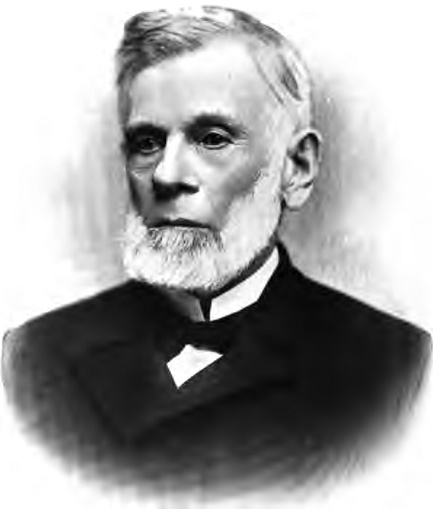
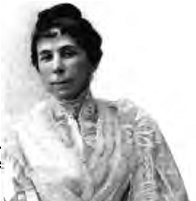
Museum founders Moody and Hannah Slade Currier

Currier's will provided for the establishment of an art museum, "for the benefit and advancement of humanity." While not an art collector himself, his funding allowed for the purchase of a great deal of art.

After his third wife's death in 1915, a board of trustees was appointed to carry out the Curriers' wishes that a structure be constructed. Multiple architectural proposals were entertained and the project was not awarded until 1926 to the New York firm of Tilton and Githens. In October 1929, the art gallery opened its new facility. The first director was Maud Briggs Knowlton, one of the first women to be a museum administrator in the United States. The building was listed on the National Register of Historic Places in 1979.

In 1982, new pavilions, designed by the New York firm Hardy Holzman Pfeiffer, were built to accommodate the museum's growing collections, programs and staff. The Currier Art Center, home to art activities for all ages, was relocated to the adjacent former Women's Aid Home in 1998.

In September 2002, the Gallery changed its name to the Currier Museum of Art, because, in the words of its then-director, it "recognizes the Currier's true mission and clarifies our function for those less familiar with us."

== Museum expansion ==
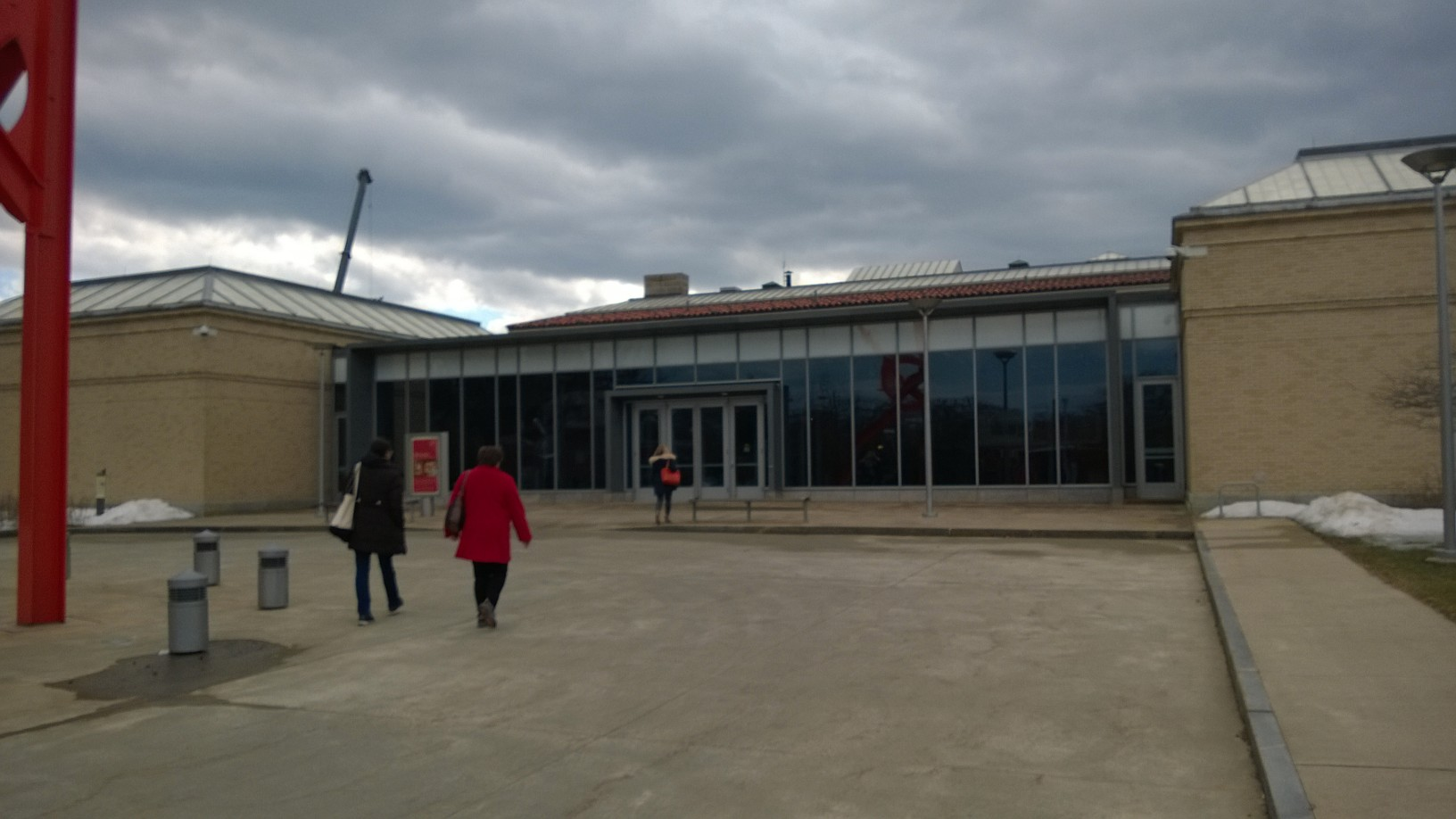
Entrance

On June 30, 2005, as part of the first phase of major renovations, a moving firm moved the historic Kennard House, formerly the location of the museum offices, from Beech Street to Pearl Street. The house was built in 1867 in the Second Empire style, and was home to several of the city's wealthy industrialists.

The museum closed in June 2006 for the duration of the $21.4 million expansion. The construction took 21 months, and the museum reopened to the public as scheduled on March 30, 2008. The addition and renovations received a 2008 Design Honor Award from the New Hampshire chapter of the American Institute of Architects, as well as a "People's Choice Award" through the AIA. Ann Beha Architects of Boston, MA, renamed Annum Architects in 2022, was architect for the expansion.

== Frank Lloyd Wright houses ==
=== Zimmerman House (1951) ===
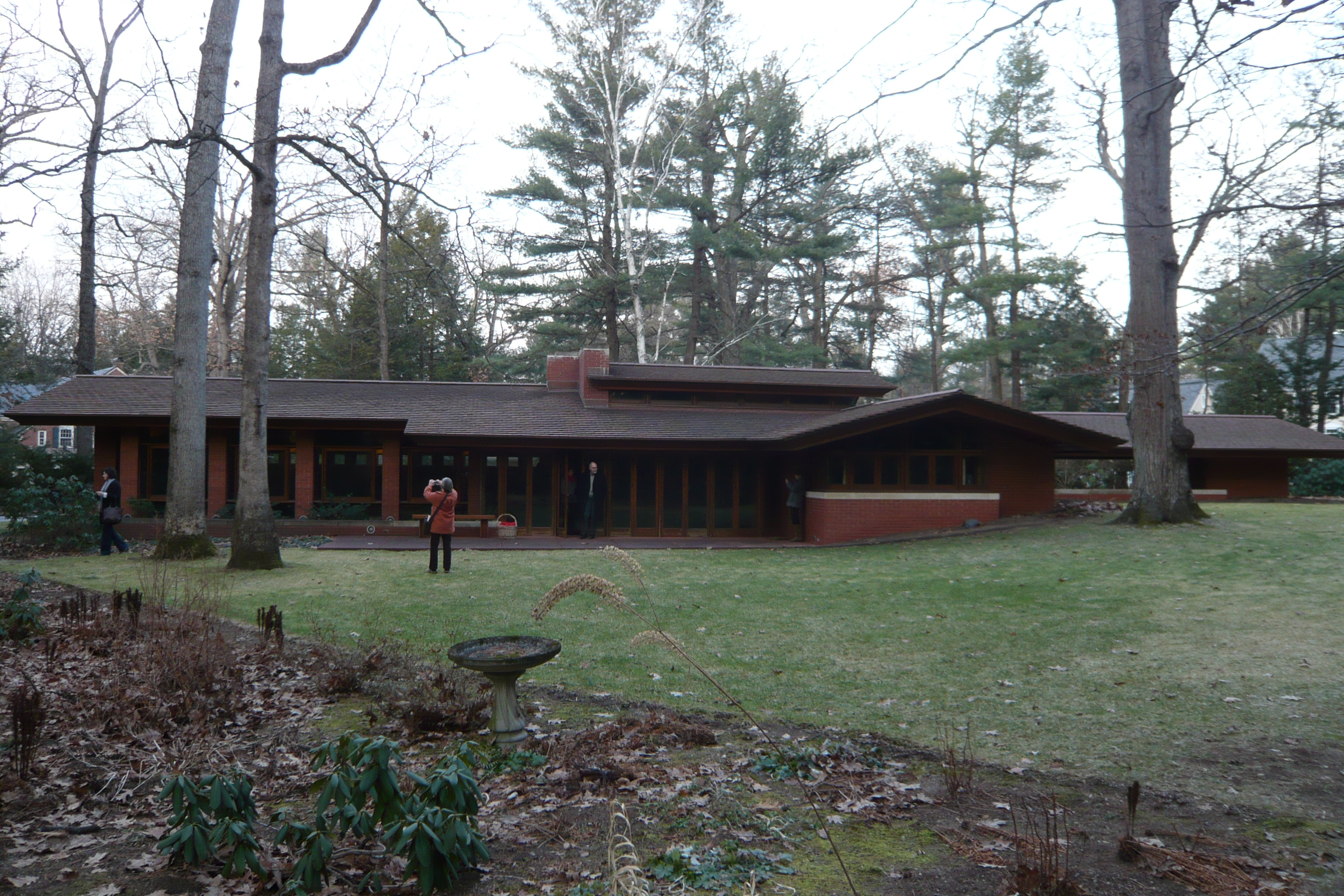
Zimmerman house

The museum operates tours of the nearby Zimmerman House, a Usonian House designed by Frank Lloyd Wright. It is complete with the original furnishings and the owners' fine art collection. The Zimmerman House is the only Wright-designed house in New England open for public tours, which are offered March–December.

The Isadore J. and Lucille Zimmerman House was built in 1950. Wright designed the house, the interiors, all the furniture, the gardens, and even the mailbox. In 1979, the building was listed in the National Register of Historic Places. Dr. and Mrs. Zimmerman left the house to the Currier Museum of Art in 1988. In 1990 it was opened to the public so that visitors could enjoy a private world from the 1950s and 1960s including the Zimmermans' unique collection of modern art, pottery, and sculpture. It is the only Wright home open to the public in New England and one of only several of his Usonian homes open nationwide.

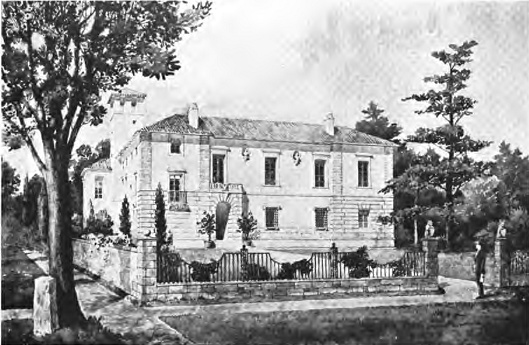
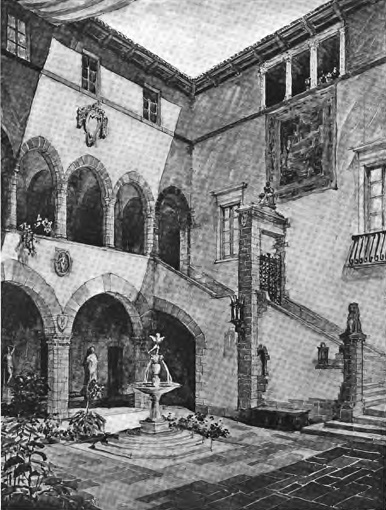
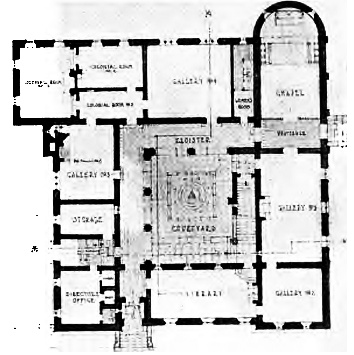
Illustrations and floor plan from the 1920 proposal for the original museum by Boston architectural firm Cram and Ferguson. This design did not win the project.

=== Kalil House (1957) ===
In 2019, the Currier Museum of Art acquired Kalil House, a second private residence in Manchester designed by Wright, for $970,000. The 1,400-sq.-ft. Kalil House is one of seven Usonian Automatic houses that were built. It is made of concrete blocks, 12 x 24 inches, laid without mortar, with rebar placed both horizontally and vertically in semicircular joints. After one or two rows of blocks were laid, cement grout was pumped or poured into the joints to bond the structure together.

The house consists of two bedrooms, two bathrooms, a kitchen and the L-shaped living room with a dining area.

This rare mid-century modern gem was purchased by the Currier Museum of Art in 2019, and regular guided tours depart from the museum.

== Management ==
=== Directors ===
- 1996-2016: Susan Strickler
- 2016-2023: Alan Chong
- Since 2024: Jordana Pomeroy

=== Funding ===
Upon his death in 2001, trustee Henry Melville Fuller left the Currier Museum $43 million, half designated for the art purchase fund. In 2012, the acquisition budget was at around $35 million.

== See also ==
- National Register of Historic Places listings in Hillsborough County, New Hampshire
