= Moody Currier =

American politician (1806–1898)

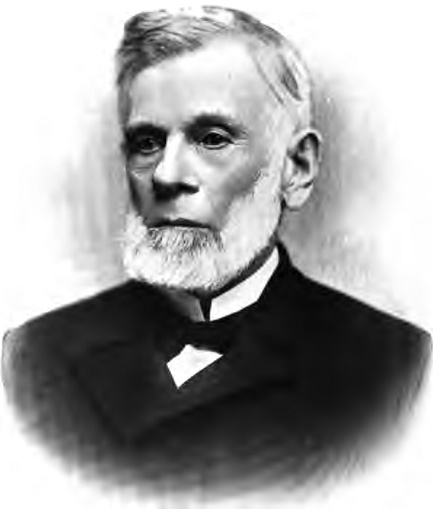

40th Governor of New Hampshire
- In office June 4, 1885 – June 2, 1887
- Preceded by: Samuel W. Hale
- Succeeded by: Charles H. Sawyer

Member of the New Hampshire's Governor's Council
- In office 1860–1861

President of the New Hampshire Senate
- In office 1857–1857

Member of the New Hampshire Senate
- In office 1856–1857

Personal details
- Born: April 22, 1806 Boscawen, New Hampshire
- Died: August 23, 1898 (aged 92) Manchester, New Hampshire
- Party: Republican
- Other political affiliations: Democrat, Free Soil Party
- Spouse(s): Lucretia C. Dustin; Mary W. Kidder; Hannah A. Slade
- Parents: Moody Putney Sr. (father); Rhoda Putney of Dunbarton, New Hampshire (unmarried) (mother)
- Education: Dartmouth College, 1834

Moody Currier (April 22, 1806 – August 23, 1898) was an American lawyer, banker, patron of the arts, and Republican politician from Manchester, New Hampshire.

Moody Currier (Jr.) was born in Boscawen, New Hampshire, the son of Rhoda Putney, who was unmarried at his birth. His father was Moody Currier (Sr.) and was never reported to have been involved in his life. Moody Currier Sr. was the son of Dr. John Currier.

Currier married three times: first to Lucretia C. Dustin, then to Mary W. Kidder, and thirdly to Hannah A. Slade.

Currier was the owner and editor of the Manchester Democrat newspaper.

Currier ran unsuccessfully in the 1848 Manchester, New Hampshire, mayoral elections.

In 1856 to 1857 Currier served in the New Hampshire State Senate serving as President of the Senate in 1857. From 1860 to 1861 Currier was on the Governor's Council. Currier served as a fellow at Bates College from 1882 to 1889. He was the 40th governor of New Hampshire from 1885 to 1887.

Manchester's Currier Museum of Art is named after him and was founded based on a bequest in his will and the accompanying efforts of his third wife, Hannah Slade Currier.

Currier died in Manchester in 1898 and is buried in Valley Cemetery in Manchester, New Hampshire.

Party political offices
Preceded by Samuel W. Hale	Republican nominee for Governor of New Hampshire; 1884	Succeeded by Charles H. Sawyer
Political offices
Preceded by Samuel W. Hale	Governor of New Hampshire; 1885–1887	Succeeded by Charles H. Sawyer
Preceded by Thomas J. Melvin	President of the New Hampshire Senate; 1857	Succeeded by Austin F. Pike
