= Samuel W. Hale =

American politician (1823–1891)

Samuel Whitney Hale
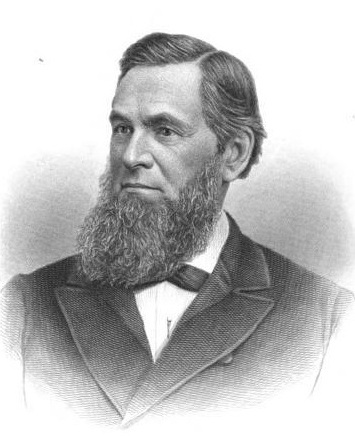

39th Governor of New Hampshire
- In office June 7, 1883 – June 4, 1885
- Preceded by: Charles H. Bell
- Succeeded by: Moody Currier

Member of the Executive Council of New Hampshire (District 4)
- In office 1869–1871
- Preceded by: William E. Tutherly
- Succeeded by: Dexter Richards

Member of the New Hampshire House of Representatives
- In office 1866–1867

Personal details
- Born: April 2, 1823 Fitchburg, Massachusetts
- Died: October 16, 1891 (aged 68) Brooklyn, New York
- Party: Republican
- Spouse: Emelia M. Hay (m. 1850)
- Children: William Samuel Hale; Mary Louise Hale
- Profession: Banker; Manufacturer; Railroad executive

Samuel Whitney Hale (April 2, 1823 – October 16, 1891) was an American manufacturer and Republican politician in the U.S. state of New Hampshire. He served as a member of the New Hampshire House of Representatives and as the 39th governor of New Hampshire.

== Early life and career ==
Hale was born in Fitchburg, Massachusetts, the son of Samuel and Saloma Hale. He attended public schools in Fitchburg before moving to Dublin, New Hampshire in 1845 to work in furniture manufacturing. Hale moved to Keene, New Hampshire around 1859 to continue working in the furniture making business, eventually becoming head of the South Keene Chair Manufacturing Company and the Ashuelot Furniture Company. His success in the furniture manufacturing business enabled him to expand his interests, which grew to include banks, railroads and several other ventures.

In 1866, he was elected to the New Hampshire House of Representatives where he served until 1867. He served on the Governor's Council from 1869 to 1871. In 1880, he was a delegate to the Republican National Convention. Hale was elected as the 39th Governor of New Hampshire in 1883. After serving one term, he retired from his political career and returned to his business ventures.

Hale died at his brother's home in Brooklyn on October 16, 1891, and is interred in the Greenlawn Cemetery in Keene.

== Personal life ==
Hale married Emelia M. Hay on June 13, 1850. They had two children, William Samuel Hale and Mary Louise Hale.

Party political offices
Preceded by Charles H. Bell	Republican nominee for Governor of New Hampshire; 1882	Succeeded by Moody Currier
Political offices
Preceded by Charles H. Bell	Governor of New Hampshire; 1883–1885	Succeeded by Moody Currier
