= John Butler Smith =

American politician (1838–1914)

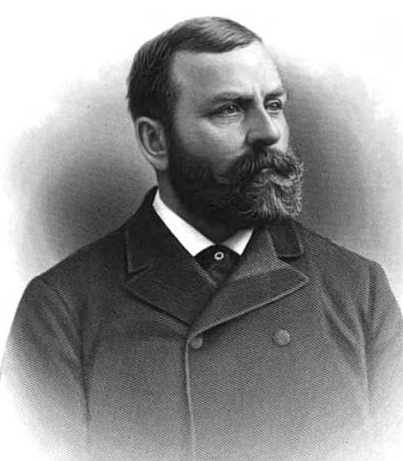

44th Governor of New Hampshire
- In office January 5, 1893 – January 3, 1895
- Preceded by: Hiram A. Tuttle
- Succeeded by: Charles A. Busiel

Personal details
- Born: April 12, 1838 Saxtons River, Vermont
- Died: August 10, 1914 (aged 76) Hillsborough, New Hampshire
- Party: Republican
- Spouse: Emma Lavender
- Profession: Banker; Business executive

John Butler Smith (April 12, 1838 – August 10, 1914) was an American manufacturer and Republican politician from Hillsborough, New Hampshire, who served as the 44th governor of New Hampshire from 1893 to 1895. He owned Contoocook Mills Company.

== Biography ==
Smith was born in Saxtons River, Vermont, on April 12, 1838. He attended the public schools of Hillsborough, New Hampshire, and the Francestown Academy. He worked in stores and shoe making factories before embarking on a successful business career, and eventually became owner of the Contoocook Mills Company and several stores, and his interests grew to include commercial real estate and banking.

A Republican, Smith was an Alternate to the 1884 Republican National Convention and one of New Hampshire's 1884 presidential electors.

From 1887 to 1889 he served as a member of the Governor's Council, and in 1890 he was elected Chairman of the Republican State Committee.

In 1892 Smith won election as governor, and he served from January 5, 1893, to January 3, 1895. Governor Smith actively proposed programs for preserving state forests and improving roads and highways.

After completing his term, he resumed management of his business interests and served as a member of the Republican State Committee. He died in Hillsborough on August 10, 1914, and was buried at Pine Grove Cemetery in Manchester.

Smith donated liberally to the Congregational Church and several charities, and the Smith Memorial Congregational Church in Hillsborough is named for him. The Gov. John Butler Smith House in Hillsborough was added to the National Register of Historic Places in 2002.

Party political offices
Preceded by Hiram A. Tuttle	Republican nominee for Governor of New Hampshire; 1892	Succeeded by Charles A. Busiel
Political offices
Preceded by Hiram A. Tuttle	Governor of New Hampshire; 1893–1895	Succeeded by Charles A. Busiel
