= Hiram A. Tuttle =

American politician (1837–1911)

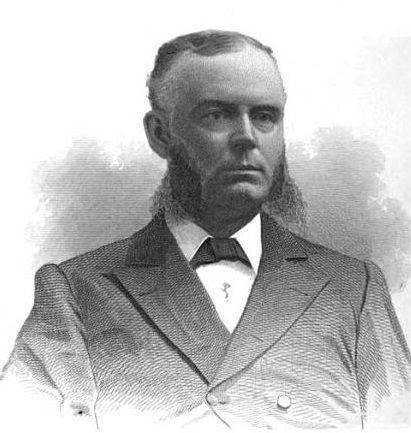

43rd Governor of New Hampshire
- In office January 8, 1891 – January 5, 1893
- Preceded by: David H. Goodell
- Succeeded by: John B. Smith

Member of the Executive Council of New Hampshire
- In office 1879–1881

Member of the New Hampshire House of Representatives
- In office 1873–1874

Personal details
- Born: Hiram Americus Turtle; October 16, 1837 Barnstead, New Hampshire, US
- Died: February 10, 1911 (aged 73) Pittsfield, New Hampshire, US
- Party: Republican
- Spouse: Mary C. French

For the Olympic horseman, see Hiram Tuttle (equestrian)

Hiram Americus Tuttle (October 16, 1837 – February 10, 1911) was an American merchant and Republican politician from Pittsfield, New Hampshire, who served as the 43rd governor of New Hampshire from 1891 to 1893.

== Biography ==
Hiram A. Tuttle was born in Barnstead, New Hampshire, on October 16, 1837. His was raised in Pittsfield, New Hampshire, and educated in the local schools and at Pittsfield Academy. He then began a business career, starting as a clerk in a clothing store and becoming successful in lumber, banking, mercantile enterprises, and railroads.

A Republican, he entered politics in 1860 when he won the election for town clerk, giving the local Democratic Party its first loss in over 30 years.

Tuttle served in the House of Representatives (1873-1874). From 1875 to 1877 he served on the military staff of Governor Person Colby Cheney with the rank of Colonel. Tuttle was a member of the Governor's Council from 1878 to 1881. In 1888 he was a Delegate to the Republican National Convention. In 1888 he was also a candidate for Governor, but lost the Republican nomination to David H. Goodell.

In 1890 he was the Republican nominee for Governor. In a three-way race that included a candidate of the Prohibition Party, Tuttle finished first. The Democratic nominee, Charles H. Amsden finished second, but Tuttle did not have a majority, which meant the election had to be decided by the New Hampshire General Court. The legislature chose Tuttle, and he served a two-year term, 1891 to 1893. During his term the state library in Concord was established, he laid the cornerstone of the main building at the New Hampshire College of Agriculture and the Mechanic Arts, and he represented the state at the dedication of the Bennington Battle Monument.

After leaving the governorship Tuttle returned to his business interests. He died in Pittsfield on February 10, 1911, and was buried at Floral Park Cemetery in Pittsfield.

Party political offices
Preceded by David H. Goodell	Republican nominee for Governor of New Hampshire; 1890	Succeeded by John Butler Smith
Political offices
Preceded by David H. Goodell	Governor of New Hampshire; 1891–1893	Succeeded by John B. Smith
