= Contoocook Mills Industrial District =

Historic district in New Hampshire, United States

- U.S. National Register of Historic Places
- U.S. Historic district
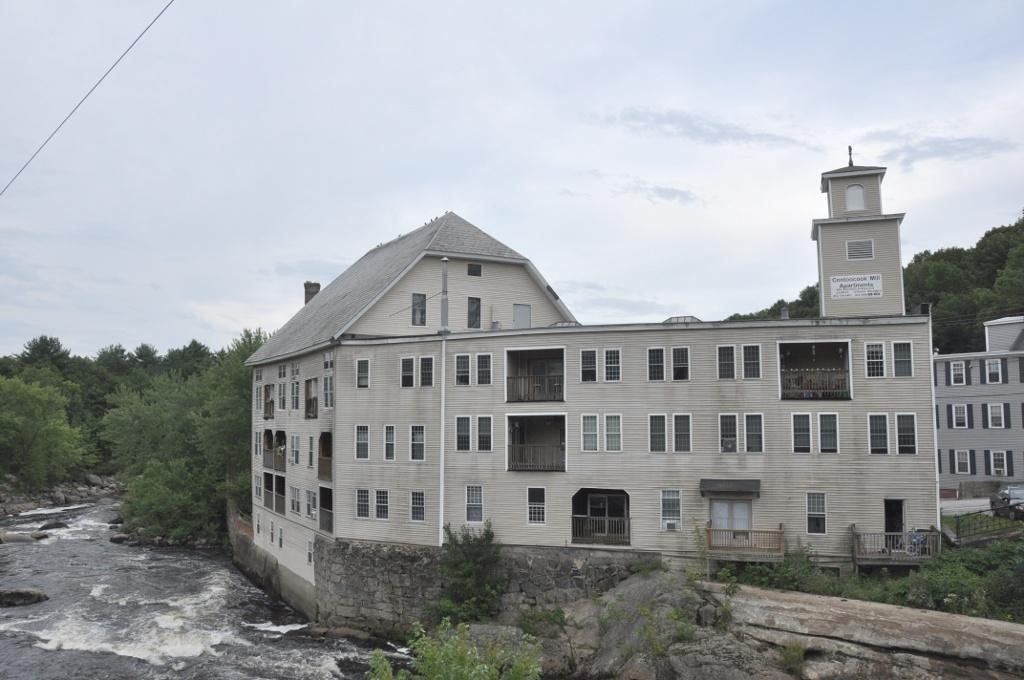

- Location within New Hampshire Location within the United States
- Location: Between Mill St. and Contoocook River, Hillsborough, New Hampshire
- Coordinates: 43°6′48″N 71°53′40″W
- Area: 3 acres (1.2 ha)
- Built: 1738
- NRHP reference No.: 75000124 (original); 85003530 (increase)

Significant dates
- Added to NRHP: June 10, 1975
- Boundary increase: December 12, 1985

The Contoocook Mills Industrial District of Hillsborough, New Hampshire, encompasses the industrial mill complex of the Contoocook Mills, a major business in the town from the 19th century to the mid-20th century. Industry on the banks of the Contoocook River in Hillsborough began as early as 1763, when a sawmill and gristmill were operated in the area. More modern industrial activity began in 1828 with the construction of a cotton mill by Josiah Marcy. This three story timber frame building stands on the south side of Mill Street, on a granite foundation through which a raceway provide the water which powered the mill. Marcy expanded his operations, building a grist mill and saw mill before his death in 1848. The grist mill, a handsome brick building on the north side of Mill Street, was operated as such until 1884, after which it was converted into the picker building for the main mill complex.

The "main mill" stands prominently overlooking the falls. It consists of two buildings, possibly built at different times, that are connected. The western portion, nearest Bridge Street, is a timber-frame construction built in 1865 by John Butler Smith, who purchased the existing mill complex from Marcy's heirs. He also built the dye house and office, brick buildings located south and east of the main mill. Smith's business was eventually incorporated as the Contoocook Mills Company, giving the complex its name. The mills were the community's largest employer for many years, producing mainly woolen underwear. The mills had shut down by the early 1960s, and were rescued from demolition by local community efforts. Some of the buildings have been converted to residential use, while others remain in light industrial use.

A portion of mill complex, consisting of five buildings between Mill Street and the river, was first listed on the National Register of Historic Places in 1975. This listing was expanded in 1985 to add buildings on the south side of Mill Street.

== See also ==
- National Register of Historic Places listings in Hillsborough County, New Hampshire
