= Hillsborough, New Hampshire =

- Town
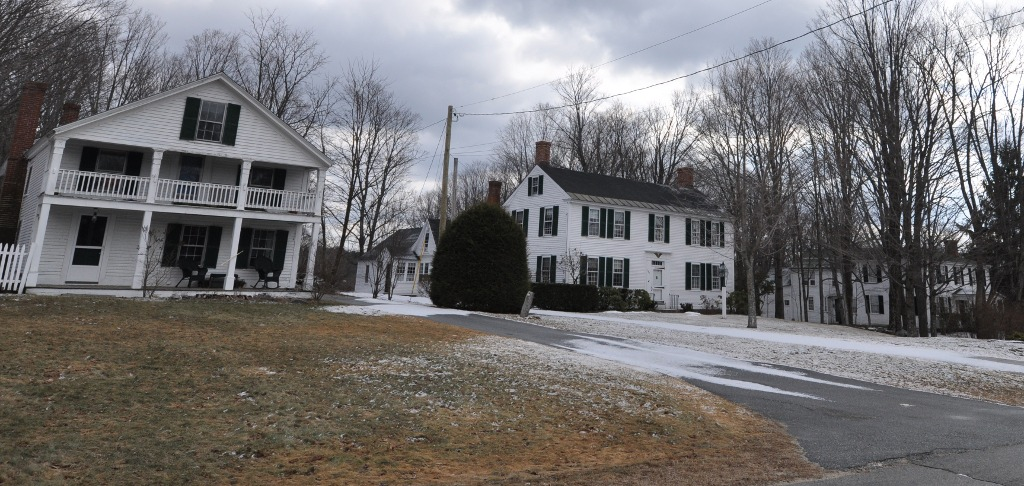
- Houses in historic Hillsborough Center

- Seal

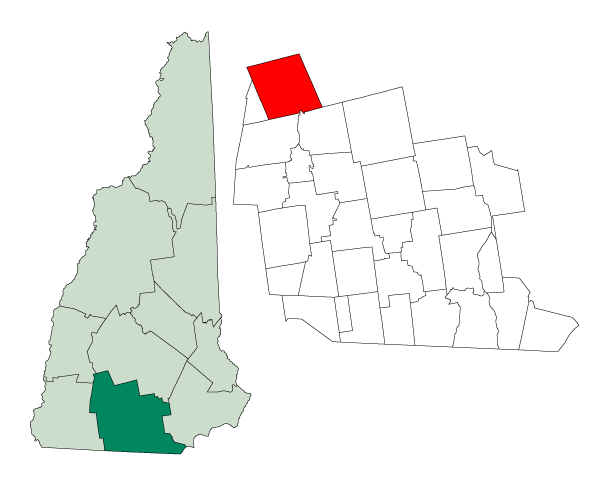
- Location in Hillsborough County, New Hampshire
- Coordinates: 43°08′56″N 71°56′32″W
- Country: United States
- State: New Hampshire
- County: Hillsborough
- Incorporated: 1772
- Villages: Hillsborough; Hillsborough Center; Hillsborough Lower Village; Hillsborough Upper Village; Emerald Lake Village

Area
  - Total: 44.7 sq mi (115.8 km^{2})
  - Land: 43.7 sq mi (113.2 km^{2})
  - Water: 1.0 sq mi (2.6 km^{2}) 2.24%
- Elevation: 984 ft (300 m)

Population (2020)
  - Total: 5,939
  - Density: 136/sq mi (52.5/km^{2})
- Time zone: UTC-5 (Eastern)
  - Summer (DST): UTC-4 (Eastern)
- ZIP code: 03244
- Area code: 603
- FIPS code: 33-36180
- GNIS feature ID: 873625
- Website: hillsboroughnh.org

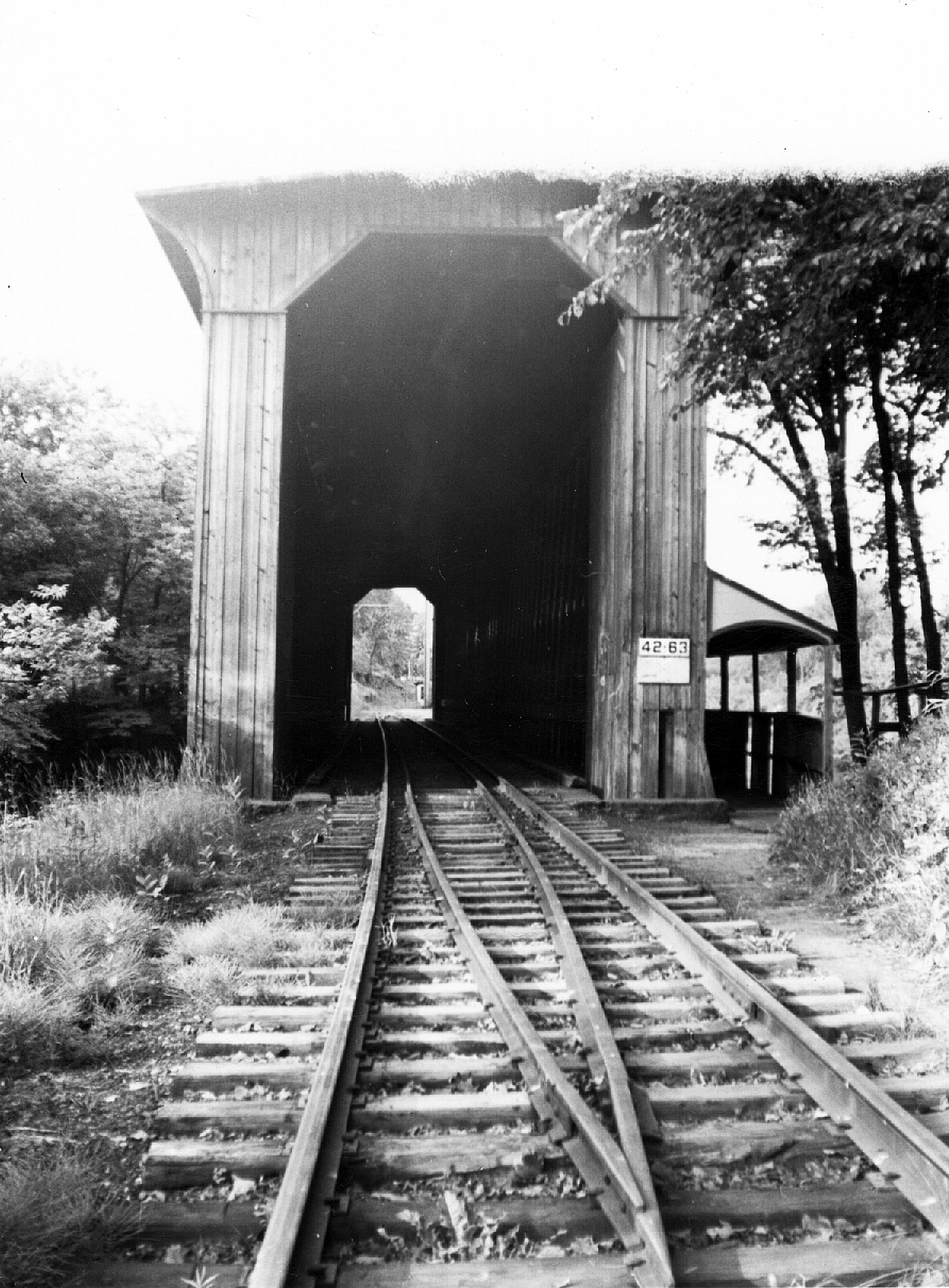
Railroad bridge

Hillsborough, frequently spelled Hillsboro, is a town in Hillsborough County, New Hampshire, United States. The population was 5,939 at the 2020 census. The town is home to Fox State Forest and part of Low State Forest.

The main village of the town, where 2,156 people resided at the 2020 census, is defined as the Hillsborough census-designated place (CDP), and is located along the Contoocook River at the junction of New Hampshire Route 149 with Henniker Street and Main Street. The town also includes the villages of Hillsborough Center, Hillsborough Upper Village, Hillsborough Lower Village, and Emerald Lake Village.

== History ==
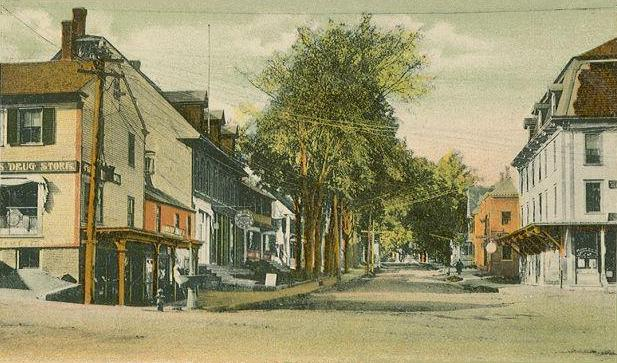
School Street in 1907

The town was first granted in 1735 by Jonathan Belcher, colonial governor of Massachusetts and New Hampshire, as "Number Seven", one in a line of nine Massachusetts towns set up as defense barriers against Indian attacks. The towns were renamed after the border between the two provinces was fixed in 1739, placing the towns in New Hampshire. Settled in 1741, the town was granted in 1748 by Governor Benning Wentworth as "Hillsborough", named for Sir Wills Hill, Earl of Hillsborough. It would be incorporated in 1772 by Governor John Wentworth.

Hillsborough was the birthplace of Franklin Pierce, the 14th president of the United States and the only president from New Hampshire. The Pierce Homestead was built in 1804 (the year of his birth) by his father, Benjamin Pierce, a general in the Revolutionary War, and twice governor of New Hampshire. Restored in 1925, the home was designated a National Historic Landmark in 1961. Listed on the National Register of Historic Places, the house is today a museum owned by the state and operated by the Hillsborough Historical Society.

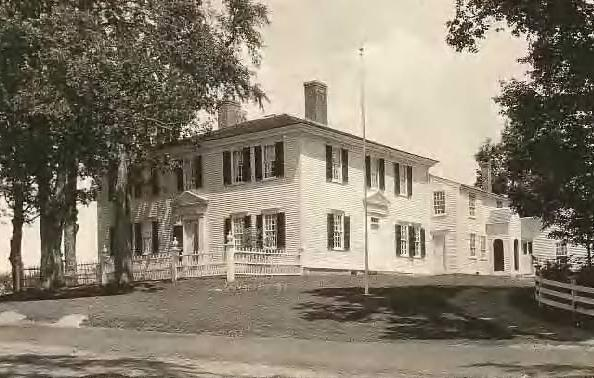
Pierce Homestead c. 1922

A cluster of five stone arch bridges built during the 19th century in Hillsborough is designated as a National Historic Civil Engineering Landmark.

Railroad service was supplied to Hillsborough by the Boston and Maine Railroad from 1878 to 1972. Rail service north to Henniker ceased in 1942, and Hillsborough became the end point on a line that once stretched in an arc from Nashua to Concord, New Hampshire. The rails in Hillsborough were torn up in 1979. Hillsborough was once home to an iconic railroad covered bridge and a curved wooden trestle. The bridge burned due to arson in 1985, and the trestle was dismantled shortly thereafter. The Hillsborough Branch now ends at Bennington; the line from Bennington to Hillsborough is a rail trail.

== Geography ==
According to the United States Census Bureau, the town has a total area of 44.7 square miles (115.8 km^{2}), of which 43.7 square miles (113.2 km^{2}) are land and 1.0 square mile (2.6 km^{2}) are water, comprising 2.24% of the town. The town center, or census-designated place, has a total area of 1.9 square miles (5.0 km^{2}).

The highest point in Hillsborough is Thompson Hill, at 1,768 feet (539 m) above sea level, in the northern part of town. Hillsborough is drained by the Contoocook River and its tributaries, Beards and Sand brooks. Part of Franklin Pierce Lake is in the southwest. The town lies fully within the Merrimack River watershed.

=== Adjacent municipalities ===
- Bradford (north)
- Henniker (east)
- Deering (southeast)
- Antrim (south)
- Windsor (west)
- Washington (northwest)

== Demographics ==
Historical population
Census	Pop.	Note	%±
1790	798		—
1800	1,311		64.3%
1810	1,592		21.4%
1820	1,982		24.5%
1830	1,792		−9.6%
1840	1,808		0.9%
1850	1,685		−6.8%
1860	1,623		−3.7%
1870	1,595		−1.7%
1880	1,646		3.2%
1890	2,120		28.8%
1900	2,254		6.3%
1910	2,168		−3.8%
1920	2,229		2.8%
1930	2,160		−3.1%
1940	2,269		5.0%
1950	2,179		−4.0%
1960	2,310		6.0%
1970	2,775		20.1%
1980	3,437		23.9%
1990	4,498		30.9%
2000	4,928		9.6%
2010	6,011		22.0%
2020	5,939		−1.2%
2024 (est.)	6,089		2.5%
U.S. Decennial Census

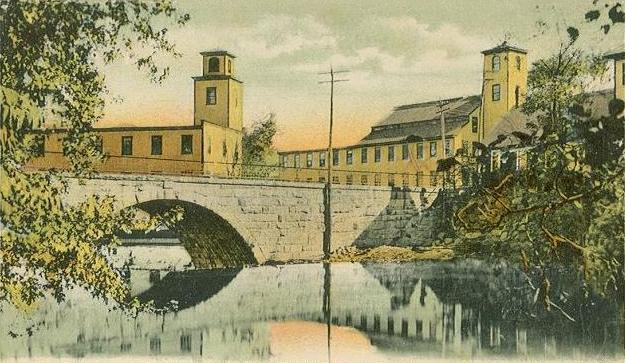
Contoocook Mills in 1907

As of the census of 2010, there were 6,011 people, 2,392 households, and 1,614 families residing in the town. The population density was 137.9 inhabitants per square mile (53.2/km^{2}). There were 2,896 housing units at an average density of 66.4 per square mile (25.6/km^{2}). The racial makeup of the town was 96.4% White, 0.6% Black or African American, 0.3% Native American, 0.6% Asian, 0.03% Native Hawaiian or other Pacific Islander, 0.3% some other race, and 1.8% from two or more races. Hispanic or Latino of any race were 1.4% of the population.

There were 2,392 households, out of which 34.2% had children under the age of 18 living with them, 50.2% were headed by married couples living together, 11.6% had a female householder with no husband present, and 32.5% were non-families. 24.5% of all households were made up of individuals, and 8.5% were someone living alone who was 65 years of age or older. The average household size was 2.51, and the average family size was 2.98.

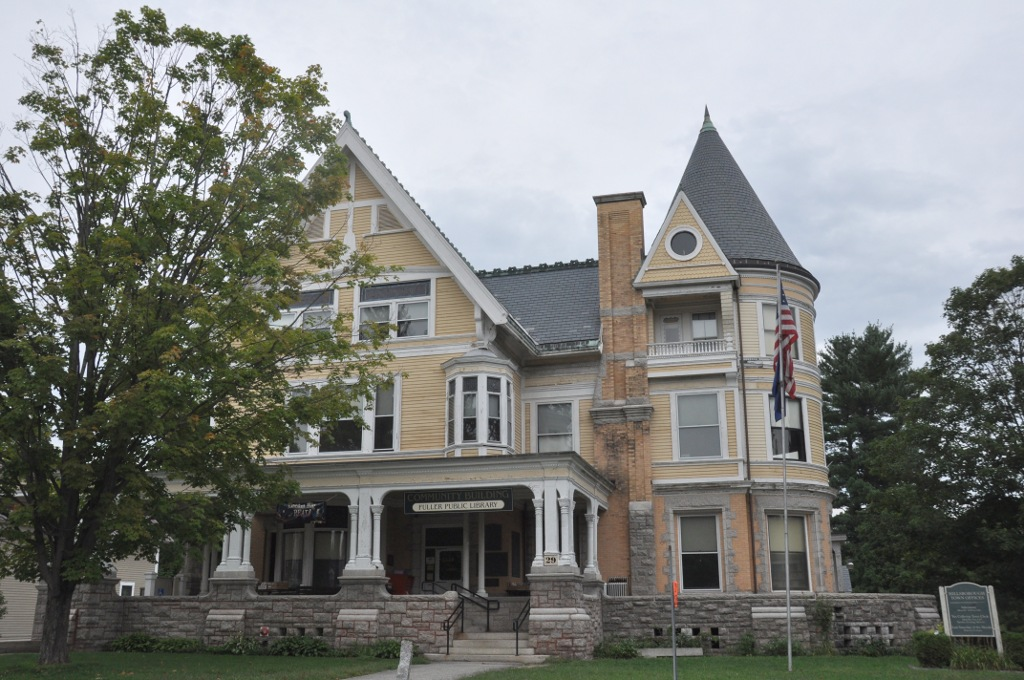
Gov. John Butler Smith Mansion, now the Community Building

In the town, the population was spread out, with 24.8% under the age of 18, 7.4% from 18 to 24, 27.1% from 25 to 44, 29.8% from 45 to 64, and 11.0% who were 65 years of age or older. The median age was 38.6 years. For every 100 females, there were 98.9 males. For every 100 females age 18 and over, there were 95.3 males.

For the period 2007–2011, the estimated median annual income for a household in the town was $54,386, and the median income for a family was $67,621. Male full-time workers had a median income of $43,583 versus $32,030 for females. The per capita income for the town was $23,232. About 7.1% of families and 11.2% of the population were below the poverty line, including 8.5% of those under age 18 and 6.5% of those age 65 or over.

== Education ==
Hillsborough is part of School Administrative Unit (SAU) 34. Public schools serving the community of Hillsboro include:

- Hillsboro-Deering Elementary School
- Hillsboro-Deering Middle School
- Hillsboro-Deering High School

== Sites of interest ==
- Contoocook Mills Industrial District
- DAR Museum Room, in the Fuller Public Library
- Five Stone Arch Bridges
- Franklin Pierce Homestead (1804)
- Railroad Bridge (1903–1985)
- Union Chapel (1887)

== Notable people ==
- Christopher Columbus Andrews (1829–1922), soldier, diplomat, newspaperman, author, forester
- David Bailey, abolitionist in Abraham Lincoln legal case Cromwell vs. Bailey and militia officer in the Black Hawk War (1832)
- Wilson Bethel (born 1984), actor
- James Frankland Briggs (1827–1905), politician
- Benjamin Pierce Cheney (1815–1895), a founder of American Express
- James Hill (1825–1897), member of the Wisconsin State Assembly and the Wisconsin State Senate
- Benjamin Franklin Keith (1846–1914), vaudeville theater owner
- Timothy G. O'Connell (1868–1955), architect
- Benjamin Pierce (1757–1839), governor of New Hampshire and father of President Franklin Pierce
- Benjamin Kendrick Pierce (1790–1850), United States Army officer, son of Benjamin Pierce
- Franklin Pierce (1804–1869), 14th President of the United States
- John Butler Smith (1838–1914), manufacturer, 44th governor of New Hampshire
- Gertrude Bass Warner (1863–1951), art collector, pioneer of museum studies
- Ethan Zohn (1973), reality television contestant
