= Charles H. Sawyer (politician) =

American politician (1840–1908)

Charles Henry Sawyer
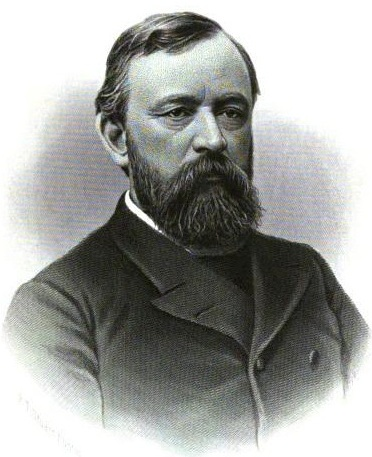

41st Governor of New Hampshire
- In office June 2, 1887 – June 6, 1889
- Preceded by: Moody Currier
- Succeeded by: David H. Goodell

Member of the New Hampshire House of Representatives
- In office 1876–1878

Member of the New Hampshire House of Representatives
- In office 1869–1871

Personal details
- Born: March 30, 1840 Watertown, New York, U.S.
- Died: January 18, 1908 (aged 67) Dover, New Hampshire, U.S.
- Party: Republican
- Spouse: Susan Ellen Cowan Sawyer
- Children: William Davis Sawyer; Charles Francis Sawyer; James Cowan Sawyer; Edward Sawyer; Elizabeth Coffin Sawyer
- Parent(s): Jonathan Sawyer; Martha (Perkins) Sawyer
- Profession: Manufacturer; Businessman; Politician

Charles Henry Sawyer (March 30, 1840 – January 18, 1908) was an American manufacturer, businessman and Republican politician. He served as a member of the New Hampshire House of Representatives and as the 41st governor of New Hampshire.

== Early life ==
Sawyer was born in Watertown, New York, the son of Jonathan Sawyer and Martha (Perkins) Sawyer. When he was ten, he moved with his family to Dover, New Hampshire. Sawyer attended the common schools and Franklin Academy before learning the manufacturing business working at the Sawyer Woolen Mills Company. He became president of the company in 1881.

== Political career ==
He served in the Dover city council before becoming a member of the New Hampshire House of Representatives. Sawyer served in the State House from 1869–1871, and from 1876–1878. He served as aide-de-camp to Governor Charles H. Bell in 1881, and was a delegate to the 1884 Republican National Conventions.

He was elected the 41st Governor of New Hampshire, serving from June 2, 1887 – June 6, 1889. After leaving office, he represented New Hampshire at the Universal Exposition of 1889 at Paris. He served as director of the Dover Gas and Light Company and the Granite State Insurance Company, and as president of the Dover Horse Railroad Company.

Sawyer died on January 18, 1908, in Dover, New Hampshire. and is buried at Pine Hill Cemetery.

== Family life ==
Sawyer married Susan Ellen Cowan on February 8, 1865. They had five children together: William Davis Sawyer, Charles Francis Sawyer, James Cowan Sawyer, Edward Sawyer and Elizabeth Coffin Sawyer. Their son William married Gertrude Hall, daughter of U.S. Congressman Joshua G. Hall. He and his family were members of the Congregational church.

== See also ==
- Conant-Sawyer Cottage, his summer house in York Beach, Maine

Party political offices
Preceded by Moody Currier	Republican nominee for Governor of New Hampshire; 1886	Succeeded by David H. Goodell
Political offices
Preceded by Moody Currier	Governor of New Hampshire; 1887–1889	Succeeded by David H. Goodell
