= Bennington (CDP), New Hampshire =

Census-designated place in New Hampshire, United States

Bennington, New Hampshire
- Census-designated place
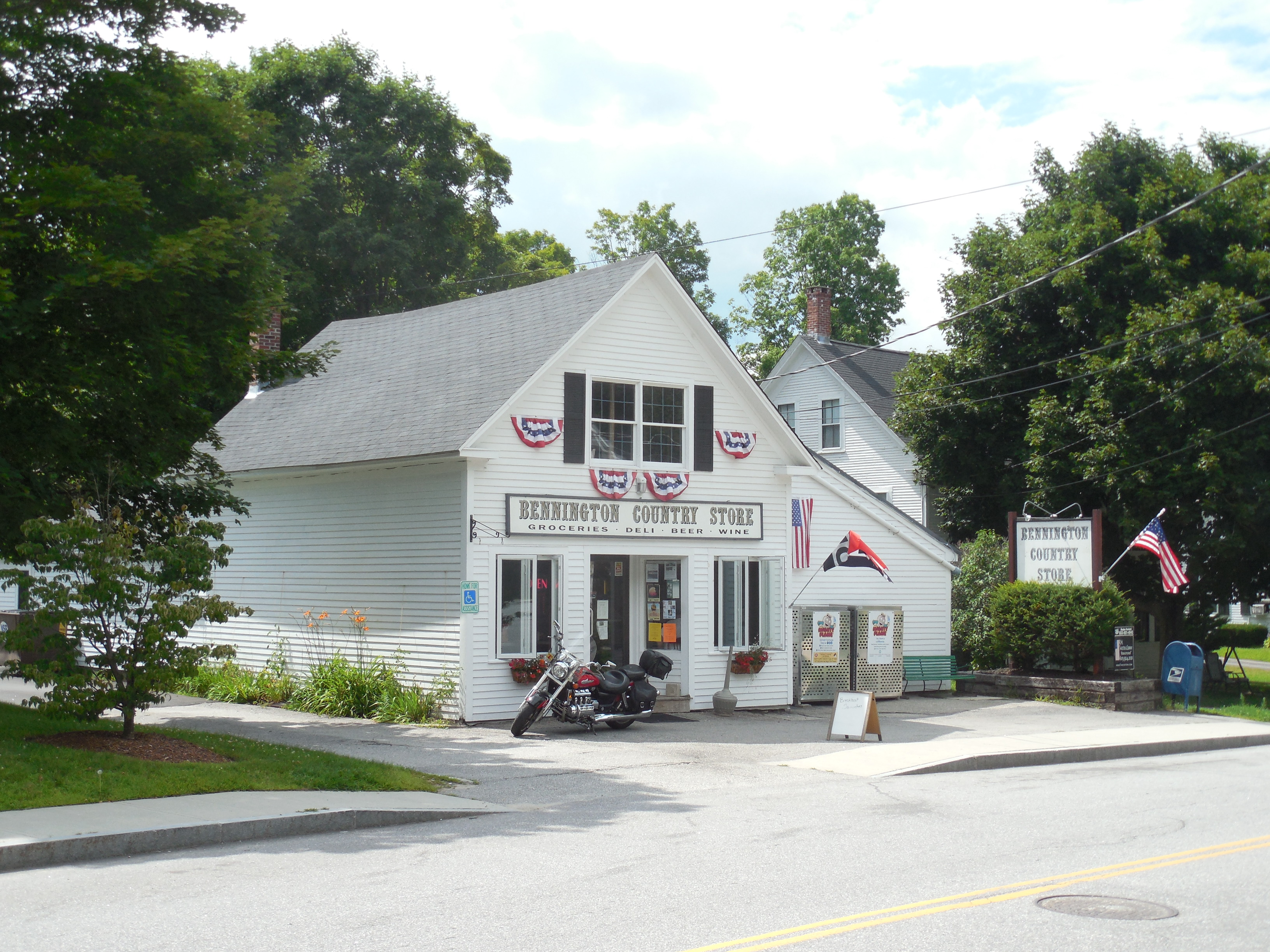
- Bennington Country Store

- Location within New Hampshire Location within the United States
- Coordinates: 43°0′6″N 71°55′25″W
- Country: United States
- State: New Hampshire
- County: Hillsborough
- Town: Bennington

Area
  - Total: 0.43 sq mi (1.12 km^{2})
  - Land: 0.43 sq mi (1.12 km^{2})
  - Water: 0 sq mi (0.00 km^{2})
- Elevation: 670 ft (200 m)

Population (2020)
  - Total: 338
  - Density: 784.6/sq mi (302.94/km^{2})
- Time zone: UTC-5 (Eastern (EST))
  - Summer (DST): UTC-4 (EDT)
- ZIP code: 03442
- Area code: 603
- FIPS code: 33-04820
- GNIS feature ID: 2629714

Bennington is a census-designated place (CDP) and the main village in the town of Bennington, New Hampshire, United States. The population of the CDP was 338 at the 2020 census, out of 1,501 in the entire town.

== Geography ==
The CDP is in the western part of the town of Bennington, primarily on the east side of the Contoocook River at its Great Falls, which drop 70 feet (21 m) over 1.2 miles (1.9 km) after flowing out of Powder Mill Pond. The CDP is bordered to the west by the Contoocook and a former railroad line. The northern border is north of Starrett Road and follows Old Stagecoach Road. The eastern border of the CDP is east of the dense village development but west of Dodge Hill Road, while the southern border follows an unnamed brook back to the Contoocook.

New Hampshire Routes 31 and 47 pass through the center of the CDP. Route 31 (Greenfield Road) leads southeast 5 miles (8 km) to the center of Greenfield, and Route 47 (Francestown Road) leads east 7 miles (11 km) to the center of Francestown. U.S. Route 202 passes just west of the CDP, on the west side of the Contoocook River, and leads north 2 miles (3 km) to Antrim and south 10 miles (16 km) to Peterborough. NH 31 runs north with US 202 to Antrim, while NH 47 terminates at US 202 just west of the Bennington CDP.

According to the U.S. Census Bureau, the CDP has a total area of 0.42 square miles (1.1 km^{2}), all of it recorded as land.

== Demographics ==
Historical population
Census	Pop.	Note	%±
2010	381		—
2020	338		−11.3%
U.S. Decennial Census

As of the census of 2010, there were 381 people, 140 households, and 97 families residing in the CDP. There were 154 housing units, of which 14, or 9.1%, were vacant. The racial makeup of the CDP was 95.8% white, 0.3% African American, 0.0% Native American, 1.0% Asian, 0.0% Pacific Islander, 1.0% some other race, and 1.8% from two or more races. 1.8% of the population were Hispanic or Latino of any race.

Of the 140 households in the CDP, 38.6% had children under the age of 18 living with them, 42.9% were headed by married couples living together, 20.0% had a female householder with no husband present, and 30.7% were non-families. 22.1% of all households were made up of individuals, and 8.6% were someone living alone who was 65 years of age or older. The average household size was 2.72, and the average family size was 3.05.

28.9% of residents in the CDP were under the age of 18, 10.8% were from age 18 to 24, 25.9% were from 25 to 44, 26.2% were from 45 to 64, and 8.1% were 65 years of age or older. The median age was 32.6 years. For every 100 females, there were 95.4 males. For every 100 females age 18 and over, there were 96.4 males.

For the period 2011–15, the estimated median annual income for a household was $54,583, and the median income for a family was $69,135. The per capita income for the CDP was $24,659. 8.4% of the population and 6.5% of families were below the poverty line, along with 8.0% of people under the age of 18 and 0% of people 65 or older.
