= Willard Pond =

Protected lake in Antrim, New Hampshire

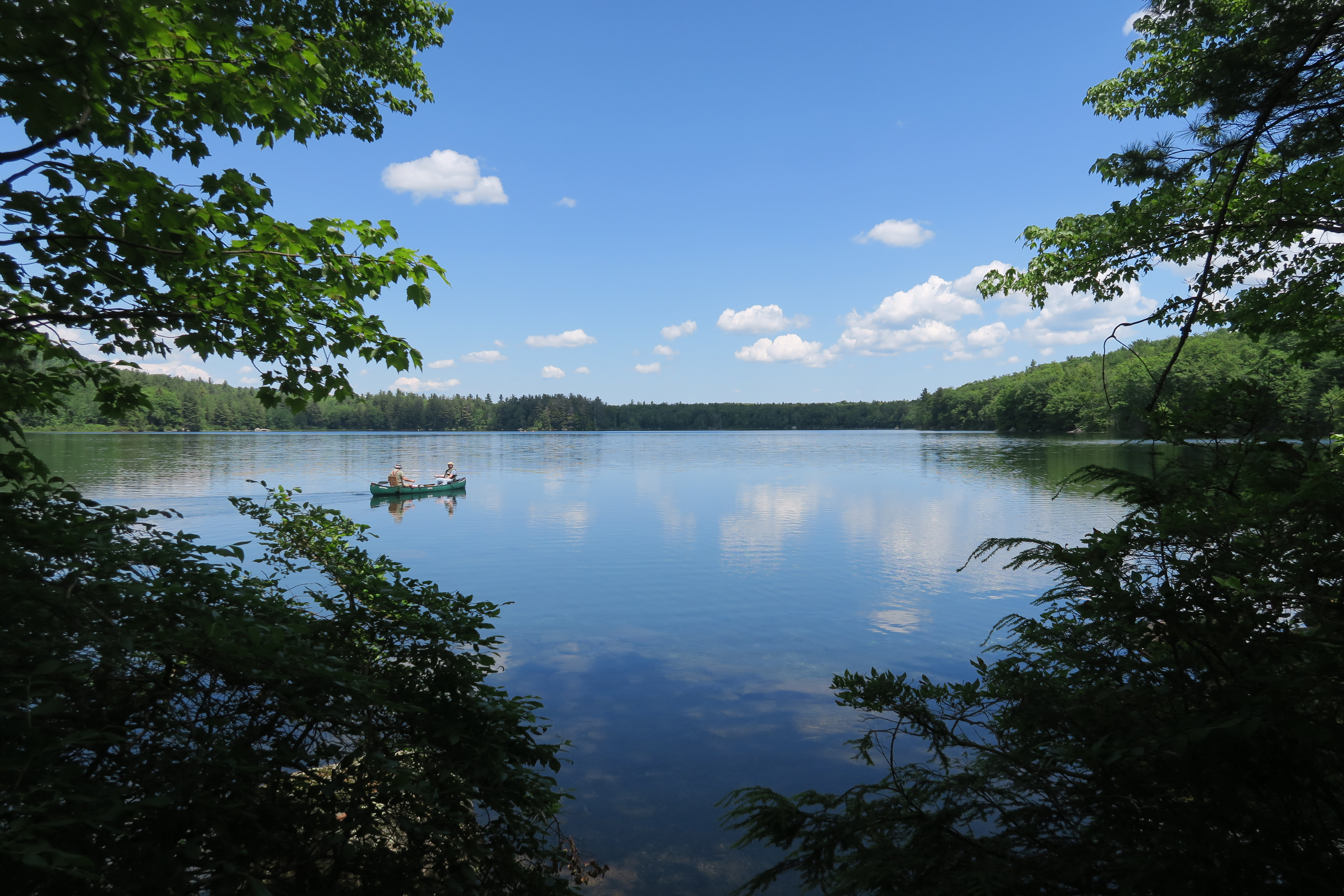

- Location within New Hampshire Location within the United States
- Location: Antrim, New Hampshire
- Coordinates: 43°01′17″N 72°00′58″W
- Type: Pond
- Primary outflows: Willard Pond Brook
- Basin countries: United States
- Surface area: 108 acres (44 ha)
- Average depth: 25 feet (7.6 m)
- Max. depth: 58 feet (18 m)
- Surface elevation: 1,158 feet (353 m)
- Islands: none
- Settlements: none

Willard Pond is a small, protected lake in Antrim, New Hampshire, United States. The lake, located in southwestern New Hampshire, is about 108 acres (44 ha) in size with an average depth of 25 feet (7.6 m) and a maximum depth of 58 feet (18 m). No petroleum motors are allowed, and fly fishing is the only form of fishing allowed. It is part of the dePierrefeu Wildlife Sanctuary, which is owned by the New Hampshire Audubon Society. Because the pond and the land around it are part of the sanctuary, the shore is unable to be developed. Therefore, there are no buildings around the pond and there won't be any in the foreseeable future. Willard is instead surrounded by extensive amounts of wilderness and hiking trails that lead around the pond and to the summits of Bald Mountain and Goodhue Hill. Willard is a popular fishing, boating and hiking destination, and it has become more popular with its mention in numerous magazines and newspapers.

== History ==
In 1967, Elsa Tudor dePierrefeu first created the Audubon Sanctuary at Willard Pond. Elsa had lost her husband in World War I and had a strong vision for a sanctuary with wildlife at the forefront of her vision. The commemoration rock at the entrance of the sanctuary reads "For Peace Among All Beings", which represents the vision she had for the sanctuary. Along with initial donations from Madam dePierrefeu's family, the Harris Center and New Hampshire Audubon have continued her dream with conservation initiatives and have expanded the sanctuary to 1,400 acres (570 ha), making it New Hampshire Audubon's largest piece of land. Willard Pond only covers 108 acres of this sanctuary, showing just how expansive it is. New Hampshire Audubon overall protects over 3,000 acres (1,200 ha) of land. This area is combined with other protected land creating a "supersanctuary" of about 10,000 acres (4,000 ha) in New Hampshire.

== Geography ==
Willard Pond is located entirely within the town of Antrim, but in order to access it one must drive through Hancock, New Hampshire, which has a border extremely close to the pond. Antrim has an area of about 36 square miles (93 km^{2}) and had a population of 2,637 people at the 2010 census. Antrim is surrounded by the towns of Hillsborough, Deering, Bennington, Hancock, Nelson, Stoddard, and Windsor, which are all small rural towns. Willard Pond can be reached by going through the center of Hancock on New Hampshire Route 123 and turning onto a dirt road. The pond forms the dead end of that road. Bald Mountain is the only visible mountain from Willard and towers over the pond with a summit at 2,083 feet (635 m). The mountain is named as such because of a fire that left the summit without vegetation. Immediately south of Willard is Mill Pond, which is extremely small but offers opportunities to see animals such as beavers and otters. Willard's parking lot is located a short walk from the actual boat launch, and there is a caretaker's house between the parking lot and the pond. Directly across the water from the boat launch is an area called Pine Point, which has a small sandy beach and an open woods area with large boulders. These boulders are present all around Willard; retreating glaciers left them there. Many boulders can be accessed by hiking or by boating.

The pond is part of the Merrimack River watershed. The pond's outlet is at its south end, where Willard Pond Brook flows south 1 mile (1.6 km) into Carpenter Marsh and Moose Brook. Moose Brook flows southeast to Norway Pond in the center of Hancock, then flows east to the Contoocook River in Powder Mill Pond. The Contoocook flows northeast to the Merrimack River, which flows south, then east, to the Atlantic Ocean in Newburyport, Massachusetts.

== Wildlife ==
Willard is known for its wildlife and particularly for the common loons that nest at the edge of the pond. The site of the nesting is usually roped off so that boaters cannot disrupt the birds. Besides loons, many other waterfowl can be found, including wood ducks and hooded mergansers. Many other birds can be spotted, including bald eagles, hawks, osprey, ravens, and turkey vultures, as well as pine warblers, hermit thrushes, black-throated blue warblers, veeries, winter wrens, and white-throated sparrows. The last two can be found year-round, while some of the others are seasonal birds. At the summit of Bald Mountain, many other birds can be heard, including yellow-rumped warblers, dark-eyed juncos, golden-crowned kinglets, and Blackburnian warblers. In the forests surrounding the pond various animals can be found including eastern chipmunks, snowshoe hares, fishers, bobcats, eastern coyotes, white-tailed deer, black bear, moose, red squirrels, gray squirrels, and many more. At the top of Bald Mountain, many red spruce grow, and the trees surrounding Willard are a mixture of oak, pine, and maple. Along the shores of the pond are various shrubs which include highbush blueberry, maple-leaved viburnum, and hobblebush.

== Fishing ==
The pond is a popular fishing destination because it is a great cold-water pond for fish, and plentiful amounts can be caught. It is considered a trout pond, and the types of fish include rainbow trout, smallmouth bass, and brook trout. Only fly fishing is allowed, and no petroleum motors are allowed on the pond, keeping it calm for kayaks, canoes, and swimming.

== Loons ==
The loons at Willard are considered very special to the people who know the pond. There are only about 500 common loons in New Hampshire, and this is one of the few states where the loons live. The common loon is listed as a threatened species in New Hampshire, and they are particularly vulnerable to air and water pollution, which is one of the reasons some populations are struggling. Willard has a few loons that nest every year, and boaters can often see the loons diving and reappearing on the surface of the water. The area where their nests are located is roped off, but it is sometimes possible to see the loon chicks. New Hampshire Audubon keeps track of the loons and sends out workers to count the number and inspect the area frequently.

== Hiking ==
There are hiking trails near Willard that lead hikers up Bald Mountain as well as through the surrounding woods. They are well-maintained and can be hiked in any season.

=== Bald Mountain Trail ===
This leads hikers up Bald Mountain. Glacial boulders can be seen at the beginning of the trail, which goes part way around the pond before turning up the mountain. It is a rather steep trail and has great views at the top.

=== Tudor Trail ===
This trail goes halfway around the pond and offers opportunities to view the beautiful wildlife along the water's edge. Halfway along the trail hikers can go left to the Bald Mountain Trail or continue to the point on the opposite side of the pond where the trail stops.

=== Mill Pond Trail ===
Looping around the Hatch Mill Pond, this trail takes hikers to the Goodhue Hill Trail, which starts about halfway around the pond. Hatch Mill Pond is historic because it was once dammed to supply waterpower for the Hatch Sawmill.

=== Goodhue Hill Trail ===
This brings hikers to the top of Goodhue Hill, which lies adjacent to Willard. While going through the woods hikers will come across many stone walls which were once used to separate sheep pastures. This trail can be veered off of to continue on the Mill Pond trail on the way back down.

== See also ==
- List of lakes of New Hampshire
