= NH 47 =

NH 47 may refer to:

- National Highway 47 (India)
- New Hampshire Route 47, United States
- NH 47 (film), a 1984 Indian Malayalam film
