= Francestown Town Hall and Academy and Town Common Historic District =

Historic district in New Hampshire, United States

- U.S. National Register of Historic Places
- U.S. Historic district
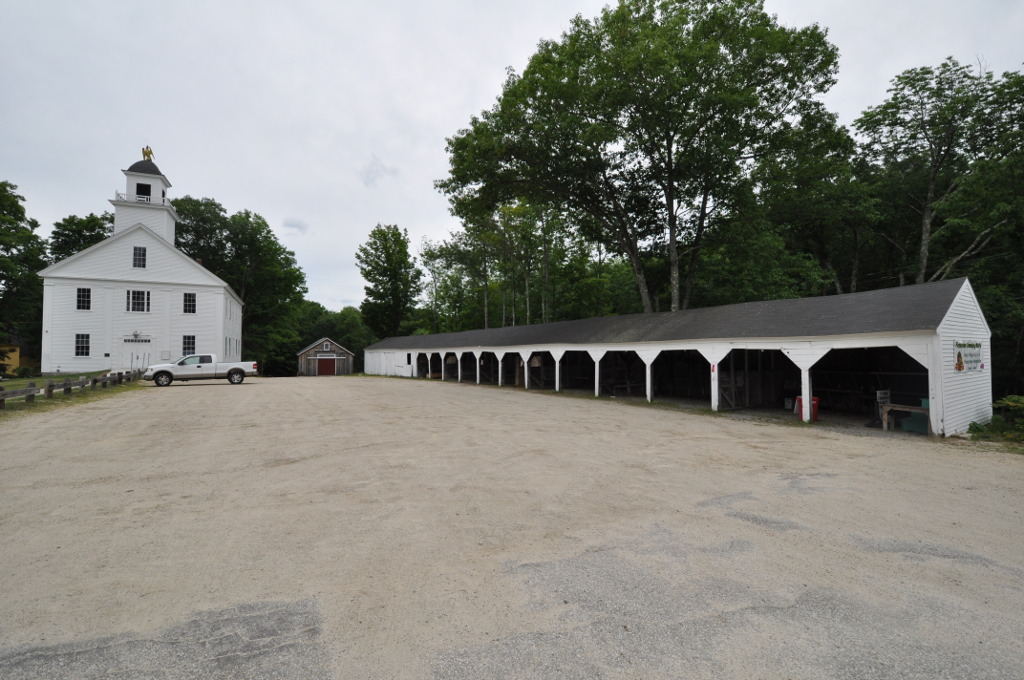
- The town hall/academy and horse sheds

- Location within New Hampshire Location within the United States
- Location: Jct Greenfield Rd. and New Boston Rd., Francestown, New Hampshire
- Coordinates: 42°59′13″N 71°48′44″W
- Area: 1.6 acres (0.65 ha)
- Built: 1772
- Architectural style: Greek Revival
- NRHP reference No.: 16000143
- Added to NRHP: April 5, 2016

The Francestown Town Hall and Academy and Town Common Historic District encompasses a collection of historic 18th and 19th-century civic resources in the center of Francestown, New Hampshire. Located at the junction of New Boston and Greenfield Roads are the town's 1846 Greek Revival town hall and academy building, a former academic dormitory building, and the town's historic common, which includes a rare example of an early 20th-century platform scale. The district was listed on the National Register of Historic Places in 2016.

== Description and history ==
The town of Francestown was settled in the late 1740s, and was incorporated in 1772. In that year John Fisher gave the town 4 acres (1.6 ha) of land for use as a town common and civic center. The northern part of this land was dedicated for the town cemetery and for its first meetinghouse, which was used for both civic and religious functions. The southern portion remained open land until 1846, when the town hall and academy building was built. This structure has seen a wide variety of civic uses over the years, including as town hall, school (these functions overlapping for many years), and post office, but has retained a great many original features despite its varied uses. Adjacent to this building is one known locally as "The Beehive", which was built as a dormitory for students at the academy.

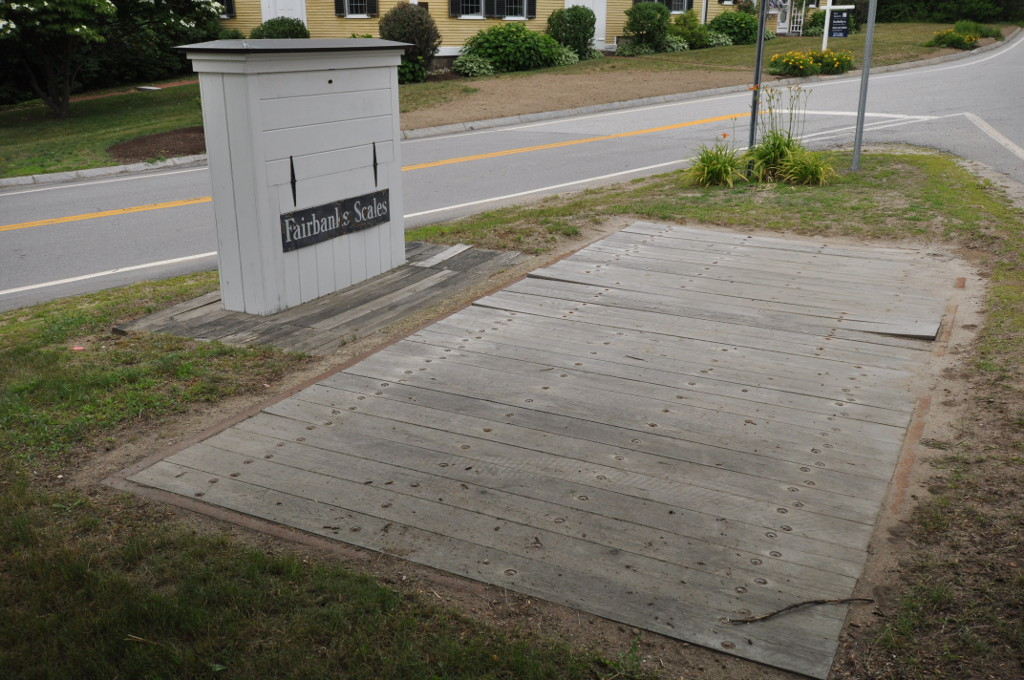
The platform scale

The open area of the common between the meetinghouse and town hall has been somewhat encroached upon by road widening projects, and a small triangular section has been isolated from its bulk. On this section are found a granite watering trough, installed in 1889, and the surviving elements of a public platform scale, installed in 1908. The scales, whose working elements were provided by the Fairbanks Company, were installed by the town in collaboration with a local hotelier, who probably also acted as a hay merchant. The town purchased the scales outright in 1923.

== See also ==
- National Register of Historic Places listings in Hillsborough County, New Hampshire
