= Francestown (CDP), New Hampshire =

Census-designated place in New Hampshire, United States

Francestown, New Hampshire
- Census-designated place
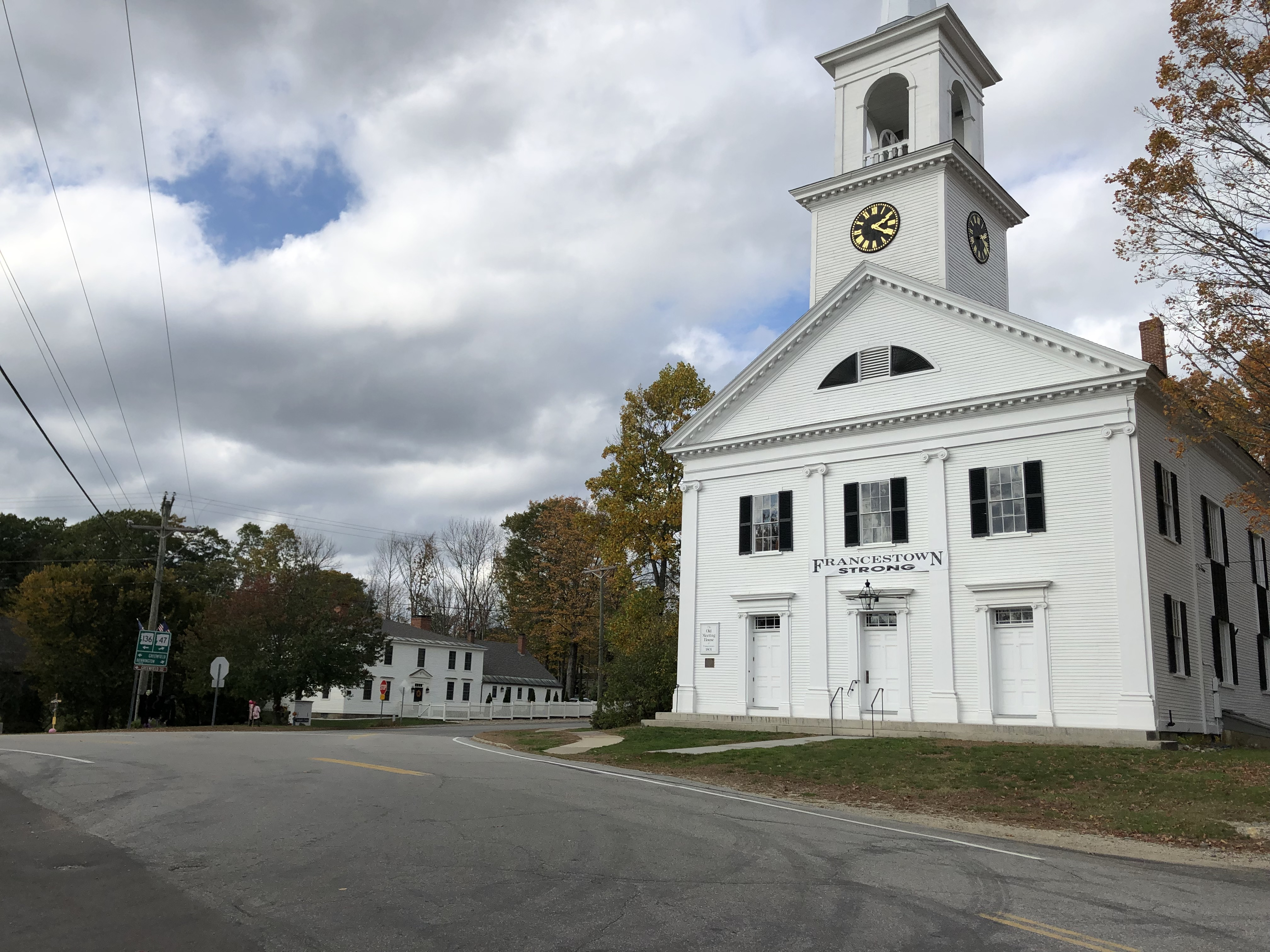
- Francestown Meetinghouse in the village center

- Location within New Hampshire Location within the United States
- Coordinates: 42°59′15″N 71°48′45″W
- Country: United States
- State: New Hampshire
- County: Hillsborough
- Town: Francestown

Area
  - Total: 0.94 sq mi (2.43 km^{2})
  - Land: 0.94 sq mi (2.43 km^{2})
  - Water: 0 sq mi (0.00 km^{2})
- Elevation: 830 ft (250 m)

Population (2020)
  - Total: 201
  - Density: 214.4/sq mi (82.78/km^{2})
- Time zone: UTC-5 (Eastern (EST))
  - Summer (DST): UTC-4 (EDT)
- ZIP code: 03043
- Area code: 603
- FIPS code: 33-27060
- GNIS feature ID: 2806679

Francestown is a census-designated place (CDP) and the main village in the town of Francestown, New Hampshire, United States. As of the 2020 census, the population of the CDP was 201, out of 1,610 in the entire town.

== Geography ==
The CDP is in the center of the town of Francestown and extends west as far as Perley Road, north past Hiram Patch Lane, northeast to Todd Road, east past Potash Road, south to Old County Road South, and southwest to Champagne Road. The Francestown Town Hall and Academy and Town Common Historic District occupies the center of the CDP.

New Hampshire Route 136 passes through the center of the community, leading east 7 miles (11 km) to New Boston and southwest 4 miles (6 km) to Greenfield. New Hampshire Route 47 has its southern terminus in Francestown and leads northwest 7 miles (11 km) to Bennington. Second New Hampshire Turnpike, a local road, leads southeast 9 miles (14 km) to Mont Vernon.

According to the U.S. Census Bureau, the Francestown CDP has a total area of 0.93 square miles (2.4 km^{2}), all land. The South Branch Piscataquog River, here a large brook, runs through the east side of the CDP and is part of the Merrimack River watershed.

== Demographics ==
Historical population
Census	Pop.	Note	%±
2020	201		—
U.S. Decennial Census

Francestown was first listed as a census designated place in the 2020 U.S. census.
