= Eri D. Woodbury =

American Medal of Honor recipient (1837–1928)

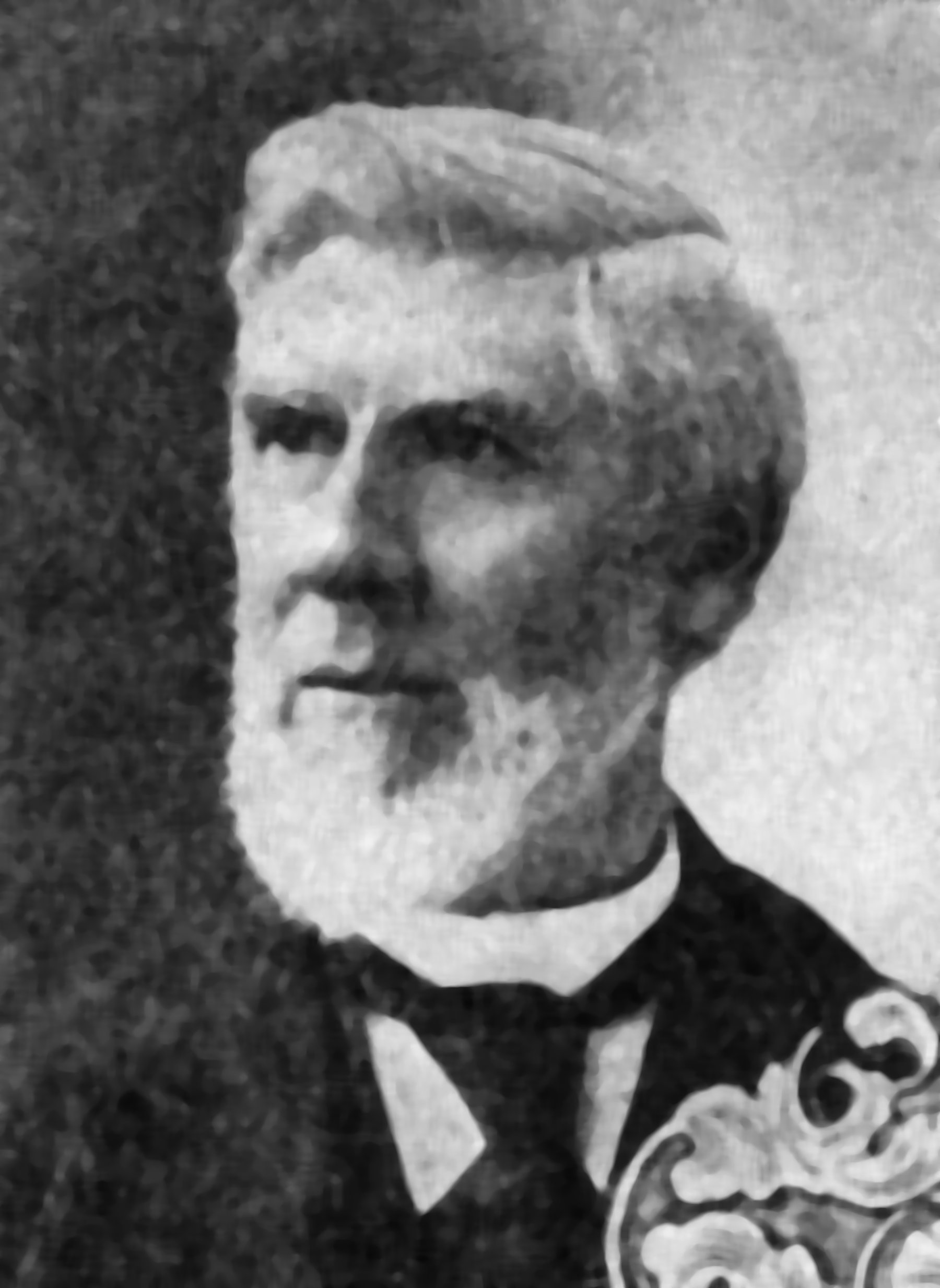
- Born: May 30, 1837; Francetown, New Hampshire
- Died: April 14, 1928 (aged 90); Cheshire, Connecticut
- Burial place: Saint Peters Church Cemetery, Cheshire, Connecticut
- Military career
- Allegiance: United States
- Branch: United States Army; Union Army
- Service years: 1863 - 1865
- Rank: First Lieutenant; Brevet Captain
- Unit: 1st Vermont Cavalry
- Conflicts: American Civil War • Battle of Cedar Creek
- Awards: Medal of Honor

Eri Davidson Woodbury (May 30, 1837 – April 14, 1928) was a Union Army officer during the American Civil War. He received the Medal of Honor for gallantry during the Battle of Cedar Creek fought near Middletown, Virginia on October 19, 1864. The battle was the decisive engagement of Major General Philip Sheridan’s Valley Campaigns of 1864 and was the largest battle fought in the Shenandoah Valley.

Woodbury graduated from Dartmouth College in 1863. He enlisted in the army in December of that year, and mustered out in June 1865 After the war, he taught at Cheshire Academy for 38 years, eventually becoming its headmaster from 1884 to 1903. He was married once.

== Medal of Honor citation ==
“The President of the United States of America, in the name of Congress, takes pleasure in presenting the Medal of Honor to Sergeant Eri Davidson Woodbury, United States Army, for extraordinary heroism on 19 October 1864, while serving with Company E, 1st Vermont Cavalry, in action at Cedar Creek, Virginia. During the regiment's charge when the enemy was in retreat Sergeant Woodbury encountered four Confederate infantrymen retreating. He drew his saber and ordered them to surrender, overcoming by his determined actions their willingness to further resist. They surrendered to him together with their rifles and 12th North Carolina (Confederate States of America) regimental flag.”

Woodbury was sent to Washington, D.C., with the captured Confederate battle flag. He was personally introduced to Secretary of War Edwin M. Stanton by General George Custer. Stanton personally presented the Medal of Honor to Woodbury. Sergeant Woodbury was also promoted to First Lieutenant and was mustered out as a Brevet Captain in Jun 1865.

== See also ==
- List of Medal of Honor recipients
- List of American Civil War Medal of Honor recipients: T-Z
