= Levi Woodbury Homestead =

Historic house in New Hampshire, United States

- U.S. National Register of Historic Places
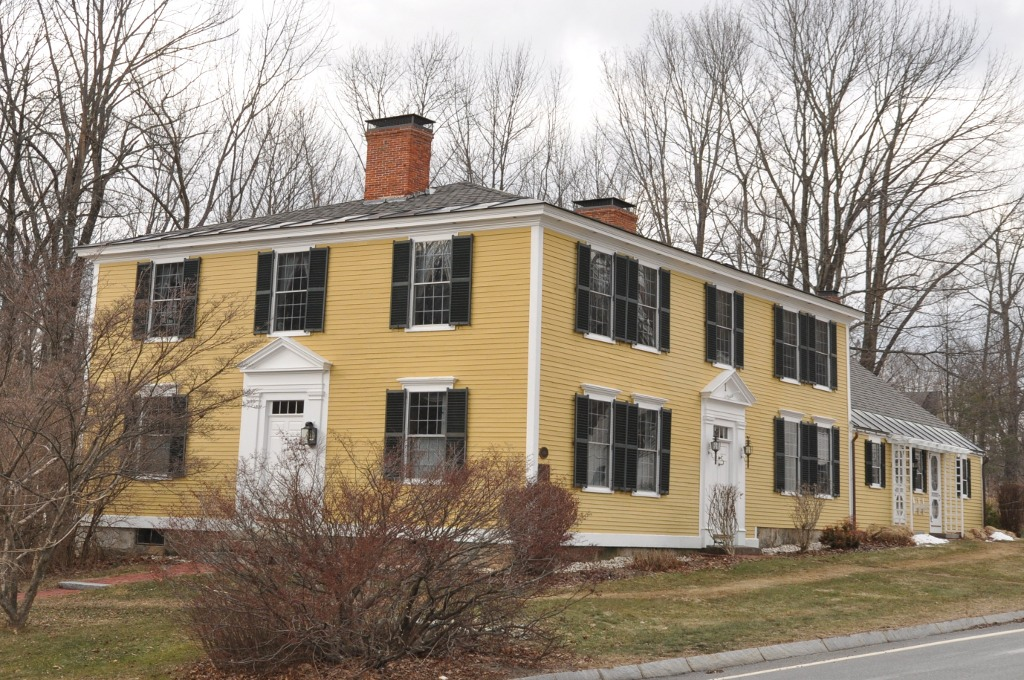

- Location within New Hampshire Location within the United States
- Location: 1 Main St., Francestown, New Hampshire
- Coordinates: 42°59′14″N 71°48′48″W
- Area: 5 acres (2.0 ha)
- Built: 1787
- Architectural style: Georgian, Federal
- NRHP reference No.: 07000152
- Added to NRHP: March 15, 2007

The Levi Woodbury Homestead is a historic house at 1 Main Street in Francestown, New Hampshire. With a construction history dating to 1787, it is a good local example of Federal period architecture. The house is most significant as the only known surviving structure that has a significant association with statesman Levi Woodbury (1789–1851), who had a long career as a successful politician and jurist. The house was listed on the National Register of Historic Places in 2007. In January 2026, the house suffered a major fire.

== Description and history ==
The Levi Woodbury Homestead occupies a prominent location in the town center of Francestown, on the west side of the triangular junction of Main Street with New Boston and Greenfield Roads. It has a 2½-story main block with a hip roof and clapboarded exterior. A 1½-story wing extends to the north. The east (street-facing) is five bays wide, with a center entrance framed by pilasters, which rise to an entablature and fully pedimented gable. The south facade, only three bays wide, has a similar entrance at its center. The interior retains many original finishes, most dating to the early 19th century when the building underwent major changes.

The oldest portion of the house, now part of a wing of the main house, was built in 1787. The house was expanded in stages, reaching its present configuration c. 1832. The house is most significant as the only known surviving structure that has a significant association with statesman Levi Woodbury. Woodbury had a long and distinguished career in state and national politics, serving on the New Hampshire Supreme Court, as Governor of New Hampshire, in several positions in the United States Cabinet, and as an Associate Justice of the United States Supreme Court. Woodbury was born in this house, and operated his law practice out of this house 1813–19. The house remained in the Woodbury family until the 1960s.

== See also ==
- National Register of Historic Places listings in Hillsborough County, New Hampshire
