= Antrim, New Hampshire =

- Town
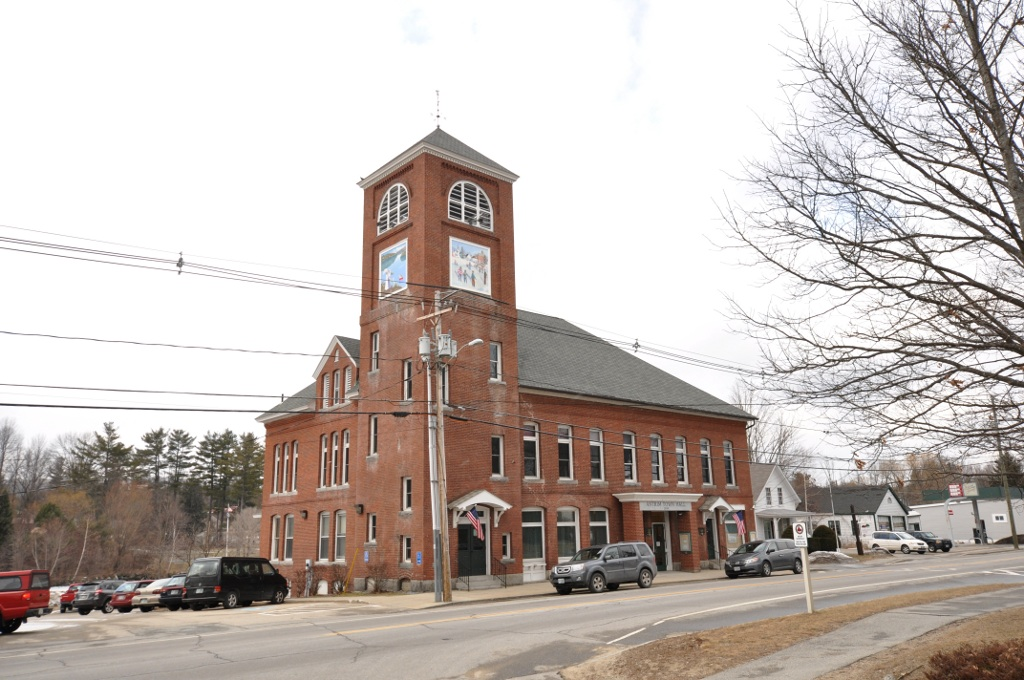
- Antrim Town Hall

- Seal

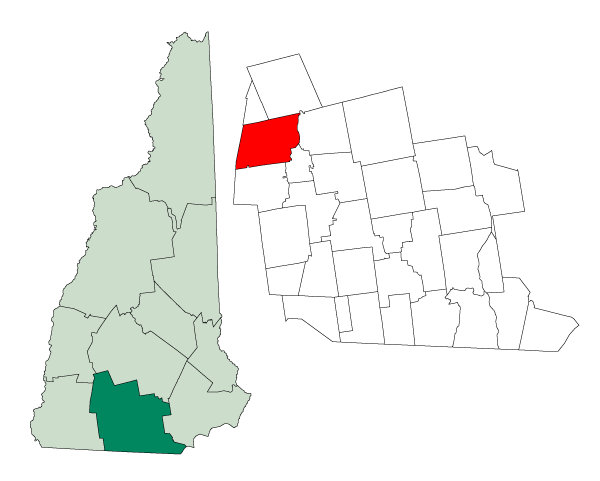
- Location in Hillsborough County, New Hampshire
- Coordinates: 43°02′58″N 72°00′24″W
- Country: United States
- State: New Hampshire
- County: Hillsborough
- Incorporated: March 22, 1777
- Villages: Antrim; Antrim Center; Clinton Village; North Branch

Area
  - Total: 36.51 sq mi (94.57 km^{2})
  - Land: 35.70 sq mi (92.45 km^{2})
  - Water: 0.82 sq mi (2.12 km^{2}) 2.24%
- Elevation: 1,289 ft (393 m)

Population (2020)
  - Total: 2,651
  - Density: 74/sq mi (28.7/km^{2})
- Time zone: UTC-5 (Eastern)
  - Summer (DST): UTC-4 (Eastern)
- ZIP codes: 03440 (Antrim); 03449 (Hancock)
- Area code: 603
- FIPS code: 33-01700
- GNIS feature ID: 873533
- Website: www.antrimnh.org

Antrim is a town in Hillsborough County, New Hampshire, United States. The population was 2,651 at the 2020 census. The main village in the town, where 1,395 people lived at the 2020 census, is defined as the Antrim census-designated place (CDP) and is located at the intersection of U.S. Route 202 and New Hampshire Route 31. The town of Antrim also includes the villages of Antrim Center, North Branch, and Clinton Village.

== History ==
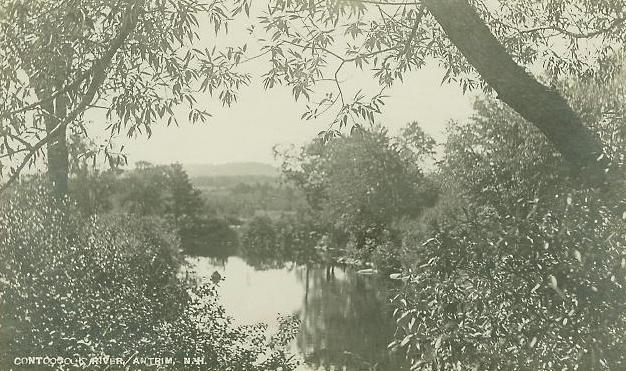
Contoocook River c. 1915

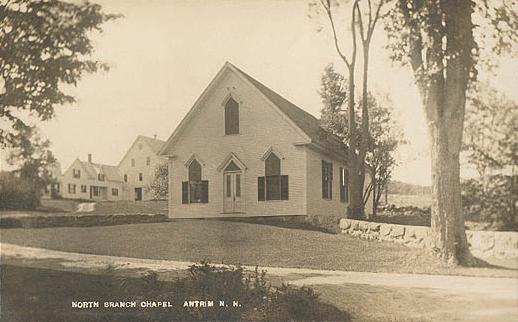
North Branch Chapel c. 1915

Settled in 1744 and incorporated on March 22, 1777, this town did not receive its incorporated name until 1778. It was named for County Antrim in the north of Ireland, now part of Northern Ireland, which was the native home of the land's owner, Philip Riley. Scots-Irish settlers established a Presbyterian church in Antrim in 1788.

With falls providing water power, Great Brook was once lined with over twenty mills along its course from Gregg Lake to the Contoocook River. Commercial development centered on South Antrim, now the main village of Antrim. Cutlery was the major industry in this town, beginning with the manufacturing of apple-paring machines in 1864. The manufacture of cutlery continued in Antrim through 1989. The town is now largely a bedroom community for Peterborough and Hillsborough. The now-defunct Nathaniel Hawthorne College was in the area of town known as North Branch. The former college campus is now home to Hawthorne Academy.

== Geography ==
According to the United States Census Bureau, the town has a total area of 36.5 square miles (94.6 km^{2}), of which 35.7 square miles (92.4 km^{2}) are land and 0.81 square miles (2.1 km^{2}) are water, comprising 2.24% of the town. Antrim is drained by the Contoocook River and its North Branch, in addition to Great Brook. Gregg Lake and Willard Pond are in the west. Bald Mountain, elevation 2,037 feet (621 m) above sea level and the highest point in Antrim, overlooks Willard Pond. Antrim lies fully within the Merrimack River watershed.

The town center, defined as a census-designated place (CDP), covers an area of 4.5 square miles (12 km^{2}), about 12% of the area of the town. It includes the main village of Antrim (once known as South Antrim or South Village), plus parts of Clinton Village and Antrim Center.

=== Adjacent municipalities ===
- Windsor (north)
- Hillsborough (northeast)
- Deering (east)
- Bennington (southeast)
- Hancock (south)
- Nelson (southwest)
- Stoddard (west)

== Demographics ==
Historical population
Census	Pop.	Note	%±
1790	528		—
1800	1,059		100.6%
1810	1,277		20.6%
1820	1,330		4.2%
1830	1,309		−1.6%
1840	1,225		−6.4%
1850	1,143		−6.7%
1860	1,123		−1.7%
1870	904		−19.5%
1880	817		−9.6%
1890	1,248		52.8%
1900	1,366		9.5%
1910	1,235		−9.6%
1920	1,052		−14.8%
1930	1,254		19.2%
1940	1,127		−10.1%
1950	1,030		−8.6%
1960	1,121		8.8%
1970	2,122		89.3%
1980	2,208		4.1%
1990	2,360		6.9%
2000	2,449		3.8%
2010	2,637		7.7%
2020	2,651		0.5%
2024 (est.)	2,720		2.6%
U.S. Decennial Census

As of the census of 2010, there were 2,637 people, 1,055 households, and 727 families residing in the town. There were 1,329 housing units, of which 274, or 20.6%, were vacant. 197 of the vacant units were for seasonal or recreational use. The racial makeup of the town was 97.4% white, 0.3% African American, 0.2% Native American, 0.4% Asian, 0.04% Native Hawaiian or Pacific Islander, 0.2% some other race, and 1.6% from two or more races. 1.2% of the population were Hispanic or Latino of any race.

Of the 1,055 households, 33.2% had children under the age of 18 living with them, 53.3% were headed by married couples living together, 10.0% had a female householder with no husband present, and 31.1% were non-families. 25.1% of all households were made up of individuals, and 9.6% were someone living alone who was 65 years of age or older. The average household size was 2.48, and the average family size was 2.92.

In the town, 22.7% of the population were under the age of 18, 7.8% were from 18 to 24, 22.3% from 25 to 44, 33.8% from 45 to 64, and 13.3% were 65 years of age or older. The median age was 43.5 years. For every 100 females, there were 97.7 males. For every 100 females age 18 and over, there were 97.9 males.

For the period 2011–2015, the estimated median annual income for a household was $64,830, and the median income for a family was $77,669. Male full-time workers had a median income of $50,991 versus $36,700 for females. The per capita income for the town was $28,760. 11.0% of the population and 6.5% of families were below the poverty line. 14.3% of the population under the age of 18 and 3.0% of those 65 or older were living in poverty.

== Education ==
Antrim is part of SAU (School Administrative Unit) #1, which is a school district that includes nine towns, better known as the Contoocook Valley Regional School District (ConVal). Students from Antrim attend the following public schools:

- Elementary: Antrim Elementary School, located in Antrim
- Middle: Great Brook School, located in Antrim
- High: ConVal Regional High School, located in Peterborough

== Festivals ==
In early fall the Antrim Home and Harvest festival takes place.

== Sites of interest ==
- Antrim Historical Society & Museum
- James A Tuttle Library
- Avenue A
- The Antrim Grapevine
- The Antrim Grange
- Memorial Park

== Notable people ==
- Luther "Guitar Junior" Johnson (1939–2022), musician
- Steve Sawyer (1956–2019), environmentalist, activist, leader of Greenpeace
