= Levi Woodbury =

US Supreme Court justice from 1845 to 1851

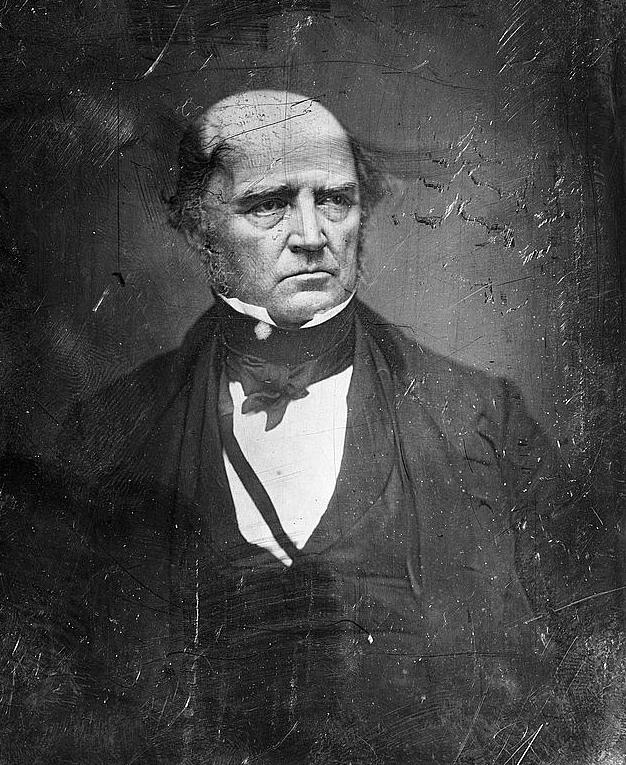
- Woodbury c. 1847

Associate Justice of the Supreme Court of the United States
- In office September 23, 1845 – September 4, 1851
- Nominated by: James K. Polk
- Preceded by: Joseph Story
- Succeeded by: Benjamin Robbins Curtis

13th United States Secretary of the Treasury
- In office July 1, 1834 – March 4, 1841
- President: Andrew Jackson; Martin Van Buren
- Preceded by: Roger Taney
- Succeeded by: Thomas Ewing

9th United States Secretary of the Navy
- In office May 23, 1831 – June 30, 1834
- President: Andrew Jackson
- Preceded by: John Branch
- Succeeded by: Mahlon Dickerson

9th Governor of New Hampshire
- In office June 5, 1823 – June 3, 1824
- Preceded by: Samuel Bell
- Succeeded by: David Morril

United States Senator from New Hampshire
- In office March 4, 1841 – November 20, 1845
- Preceded by: Henry Hubbard
- Succeeded by: Benning Jenness
- In office March 16, 1825 – March 3, 1831
- Preceded by: John Parrott
- Succeeded by: Isaac Hill

Speaker of the New Hampshire House of Representatives
- In office 1825
- Preceded by: Edmund Parker
- Succeeded by: Henry Hubbard

Associate Justice of the New Hampshire Supreme Court
- In office 1817–1823

Personal details
- Born: December 22, 1789 Francestown, New Hampshire, U.S.
- Died: September 4, 1851 (aged 61) Portsmouth, New Hampshire, U.S.
- Party: Democratic-Republican (Before 1825); Democratic (1828–1851)
- Spouse: Elizabeth Woodbury
- Education: Dartmouth College (BA); Litchfield Law School

Levi Woodbury (December 22, 1789 – September 4, 1851) was an American attorney, jurist, and Democratic politician from New Hampshire. During a four-decade career in public office, Woodbury served as an associate justice of the Supreme Court of the United States, a United States senator, the ninth governor of New Hampshire, and cabinet member in the Andrew Jackson and Martin Van Buren administrations. He was promoted as a candidate for the Democratic nomination for President of the United States in 1848.

Born in Francestown, New Hampshire, he established a legal practice in Francestown in 1812. After serving in the New Hampshire Senate, he was appointed to the New Hampshire Supreme Court in 1817. He served as Governor of New Hampshire from 1823 to 1824 and represented New Hampshire in the Senate from 1825 to 1831, becoming affiliated with the Democratic Party of Andrew Jackson. He served as the United States Secretary of the Navy under President Jackson and as the United States Secretary of the Treasury under Jackson and President Martin Van Buren.

He served another term representing New Hampshire in the Senate from 1841 to 1845, when he accepted President James K. Polk's appointment to the Supreme Court. Woodbury was the first justice to have attended law school. (Note: Woodbury was the 30th person appointed to the Supreme Court, with 29 preceding him. And he himself did not leave school having earned a law degree. The first person on the Supreme Court to hold that distinction was Benjamin Robbins Curtis, the 32nd person appointed to the Court.)

== Life and early career ==
Woodbury was born in Francestown, New Hampshire, the son of Mary and Peter Woodbury. He began his education at Atkinson Academy. He graduated from Dartmouth College, Phi Beta Kappa, in 1809, briefly attended Tapping Reeve Law School in Litchfield, Connecticut, and read law to be admitted to the New Hampshire Bar in 1812. He became the first Supreme Court justice to attend law school. He was in private practice in Francestown from 1812 to 1816. He also joined the Freemasons.

His education contributed to his early start in law, which led to his later political positions. During his time in Francestown, he wrote the Hillsborough Resolves to defend the Madison administration for their decisions in the War of 1812, which marked the beginning of his political involvement. Following the publication of his defense, he gained the recognition he needed to receive an appointment as clerk of the New Hampshire State Senate from 1816 to 1817. In quick succession, he was appointed to the Superior Court of Judicature from 1817 to 1823, and in 1823, he was elected as the governor of New Hampshire. During the time of his gubernatorial election, there was factionalism within the party. The caucus chose Samuel Dinsmoor as the candidate for governor, but an "irregular" public convention elected Woodbury as the other candidate. Woodbury defeated Dinsmoor by a wide margin, but his one year as governor was a failure. He tried to reconcile the Federalists and Democratic-Republicans but did not make a lot of progress. Throughout Woodbury's political career, he was characterized as being independent and moderate, which some scholars interpret as indecisiveness and hesitancy.

After his term as governor, he served as Speaker of the New Hampshire House of Representatives in 1825.

== Federal government service ==
=== Senate and Cabinet service ===
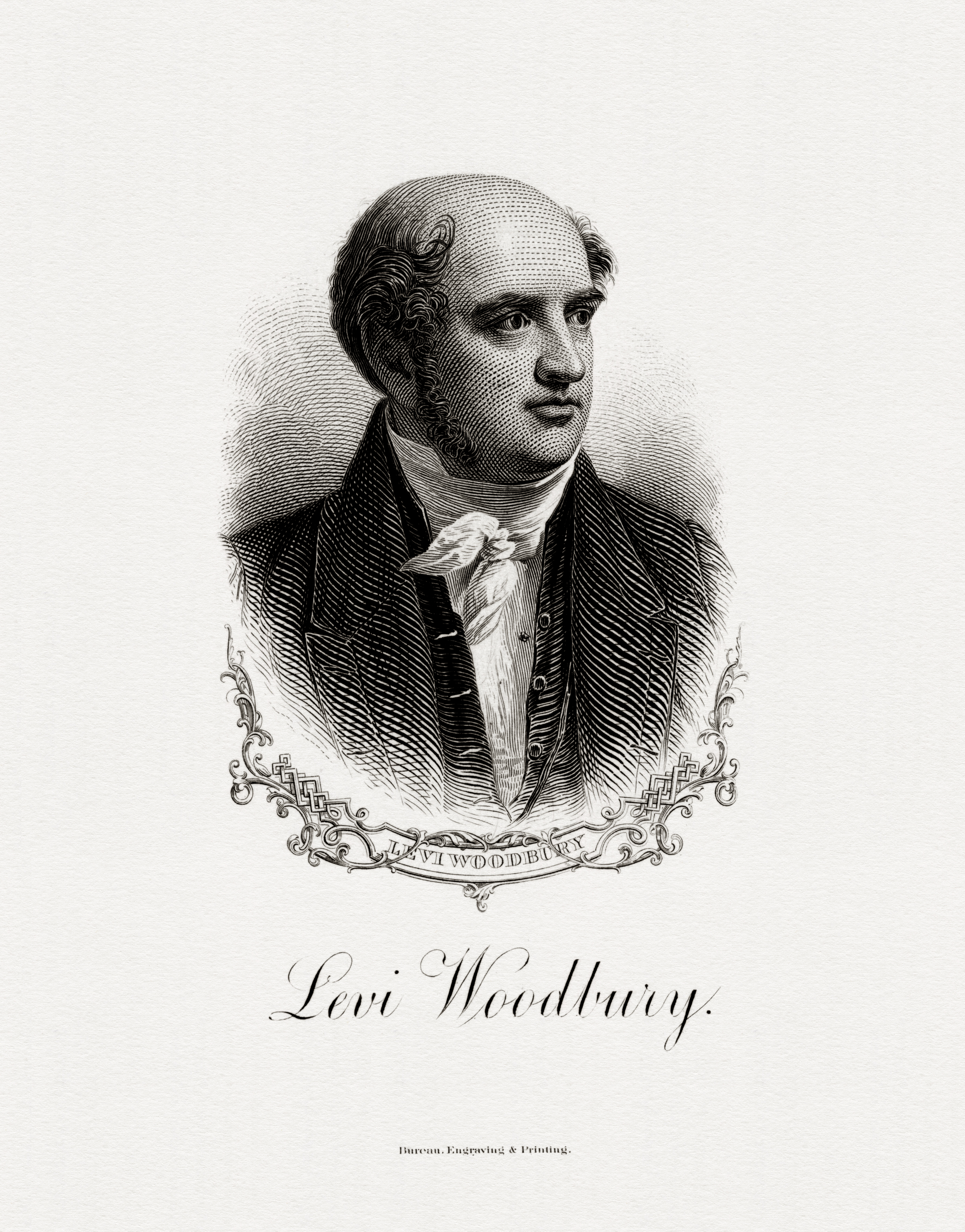
BEP portrait of Woodbury as Secretary of the Treasury

Woodbury served as a United States Senator from New Hampshire from 1825 until 1831, during which time he served as the Chairman of the Senate Commerce Committee (1827–31). Elected to serve in the New Hampshire State Senate in 1831, Woodbury did not take office due to his appointment as United States Secretary of the Navy under President Andrew Jackson, from 1831 to 1834. At the beginning of this term, he was instrumental in the appointment of fellow New Hampshireman Edmund Roberts as special agent and envoy to the Far East. Woodbury served as Secretary of the Treasury under Jackson and Martin Van Buren from 1834 to 1841, and served again as Senator from New Hampshire from 1841 to 1845. He was a justice of the U.S. Supreme Court, 1845 to 1851.

As a U.S. Senator, Woodbury was a dependable Jackson Democrat, successfully working to end the Second Bank of the United States; like Jackson he favored an "independent" treasury system and "hard money" over paper money. In retrospect, the financial Panic of 1837 and the collapse of speculative land prices were legacies of Woodbury's tenure. After the Panic, Woodbury realised that the U.S. Treasury needed a more secure administration of its own funds than commercial banks supplied, and he backed the act for an "Independent Treasury System" passed by Congress in 1840. It was largely repealed under the new administration the following year, but the foundation was laid for an independent U.S. Treasury, finally established in 1846, under President James K. Polk. Woodbury also served as chairman of the U.S. Senate Committee on Finance during a Special Session of the 29th Congress. His ten-day chairmanship is the shortest on record.

=== Supreme Court tenure ===
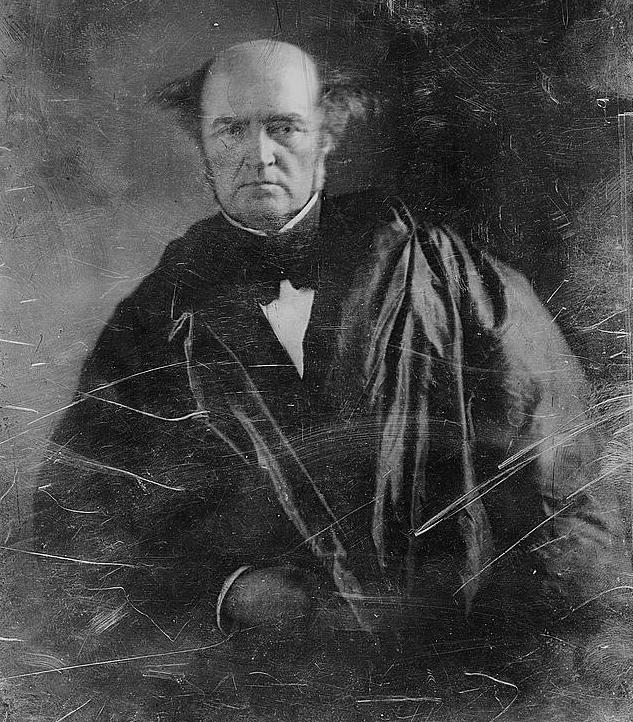
Associate Justice Levi Woodbury (c. 1850)

In the 1844 presidential election, Woodbury and the Jackson Democrats supported the Democrats' nomination of Polk. In that year, Woodbury also delivered a Phi Beta Kappa Address at his alma mater, Dartmouth College, titled "Progress." The address discussed Thomas Cole's series of five landscape paintings, The Course of Empire. Woodbury believed that unlike Cole's depiction of a cycle of rise and decline, there would be only a rise in the United States.

On September 20, 1845, Polk gave Woodbury a recess appointment as an associate justice of the United States Supreme Court, to a seat vacated by Joseph Story. He was sworn into office three days later. Formally nominated to the seat on December 23, 1845, Woodbury was confirmed by the United States Senate on January 3, 1846.

News of Woodbury's appointment was well received by the public and he was praised as a protector of constitutional rights. During his tenure, he wrote major opinions for the Court regarding the Contract Clause, slavery, the political question doctrine, and the Commerce Clause.

He was promoted as a candidate for president at the 1848 Democratic National Convention, his support was largely centered in New England. He remained on the Court until his death at age 61 in 1851, in Portsmouth, New Hampshire.

==== Personal writings ====
Woodbury's writings shed light on his rulings as a justice, which reflect his strict constructionist views. He was one of the few justices on the court at the time to write outside of his rulings, along with McLean and Taney. Woodbury was concerned with individual rights before those rights were the focus of the court, and also thought slavery was wrong. He wrote of the judicial powers:

In due time, by stopping the fountain-head of slavery, through the power expressly granted to Congress to prohibit further additions to it from abroad ... the country will be enabled gradually to purify the corrupt waters that have flowed from this fountain ... if all this should be accomplished without violating the sacred compromises of the constitution.

Woodbury ruled based on the powers that exist in the US Constitution. He believed that slavery had been written into the Constitution but could be scaled down by Congress. In his rulings as a justice, he abided by the Fugitive Slave Clause in Article IV, Section 2.

==== Jones v. Van Zandt ====
Although Woodbury had already died when the Court decided Dred Scott v. Sandford (1857), he set a precedent when he wrote for the majority in Jones v. Van Zandt (1847).

Van Zandt was an abolitionist in Ohio who harbored fugitive slaves and was sued for $500 (~$12,036 in 2025) for violating the Fugitive Slave Act of 1793. The primary issue was whether the Fugitive Slave Act was constitutional. Woodbury ruled in favor of the rights of slaveholders by arguing that the compromises in the US Constitution, such as the Fugitive Slave Clause, bound the states to enforce the act. As a strict constructionist, he defended the rights of slaveholders as protected in the Constitution regardless of his personal stance on slavery. Woodbury viewed slavery as a political question that should be settled by each state: "this Court has no alternative, while they exist, but to stand by the Constitution and laws with fidelity to their duties and their oaths... to go where that Constitution and the laws lead, and not to break both."

The decision helped reinforce the ideas that slavery was written into the Constitution and that slaveholders' rights were protected. It also furthered the precedent established in Prigg v. Pennsylvania that the Fugitive Slave Act was constitutional and paved the way for the Dred Scott decision.

==== Contract Clause cases ====
Aside from his contribution to the precedent for slavery cases, Woodbury shaped the Court's interpretation of the Contract Clause by reinforcing the obligation of contracts. His tenure on the Court came during a confused and sectionally-divided era in Supreme Court history.

In Planters' Bank v. Sharp (1848), Mississippi passed a statute forbidding a state bank from transferring notes to other banks because of the instability of the banking system after the Bank War. The issue the Court had to decide was "whether an act of the legislature of Mississippi... impaired the obligation of any contract which the state or others had previously entered into with Planters' Bank." Woodbury ruled in favor of the bank and found that the Mississippi statute violated the Contract Clause in Article 1, Section 10, of the US Constitution. He explained the contracts that were violated under the statute: "First, in the obligation of the contract in the charter with the state; and secondly, in the obligation of the contract made by the signers of the note declared on with the bank."

The contracts were valid because a bank had the power to make them when they related to the bank's business purposes and monetary dealings and a right to sell anything that it owned. Justices Taney and Peter V. Daniel dissented and favored more state control. Woodbury's leadership in dealing with the Commerce Clause helped reinforce the Contract Clause, but Taney would have taken the court in a direction to place state power over contracts.

==== Commerce Clause cases ====
Woodbury also formed the basis for the interpretation of the Commerce Clause in the License Cases in which he developed a case-by-case method for determining the extent of state regulatory power. His reasoning was the basis for the Cooley Doctrine, a later development by his successor, Justice Benjamin R. Curtis.

In the License Cases, the Court dealt with state liquor-censoring statutes. Lacking a clear precedent for how much power the states had under the Constitution to regulate commerce, the justices were not unified enough to write a majority opinion. Woodbury's opinion focused on the context on a case-by-case basis instead of deciding based on an abstract principle of commerce power. He stated that the "subject of buying and selling within a state is one as exclusively belonging to the power of the state over its internal trade as that to regulate foreign commerce is with the general government under the broadest construction of that power." He distinguished between a prohibition on selling liquor on a certain day and a prohibition on imports, which would reach into the federal government's jurisdiction of commerce. Woodbury studied the particulars of the case instead of examining only the source of power in the Commerce Clause. The Court later followed Woodbury's reasoning in Cooley v. Board of Wardens that it would decide on a case-by-case basis depending on whether the subject of regulation was local in nature or required national legislation. Woodbury's opinion had helped bring about that shift.

Woodbury's contributions to the interpretation of the Commerce Clause extended to a defense of states' rights in Waring v. Clarke. He dissented from the majority's attempts to expand federal admiralty jurisdiction. A ship accident had occurred near New Orleans on the Mississippi River, and the Court was to decide whether the federal government or the Louisiana government had jurisdiction over it. Woodbury disagreed with the assertion that the federal government had jurisdiction over every river that was controlled by the ocean's tide because citizens who had gotten into accidents on the water would have to travel greater distances if the federal government was involved than if they settled the dispute near where it had happened.

He urged the federal government to resist interfering with state power that is written into the Constitution and went so far as to say that the extension of federal power could be troublesome when it was applied to issues such as slavery. Woodbury warned that overextending federal powers would lead to "a struggle for jurisdiction between courts of the states and courts of the United States, always delicate, and frequently endangering the harmony of our political system." He advocated states' rights and indicated how he would rule in future slavery cases in what is now called a strict constructionist.

== Presidential candidacy and death ==
Woodbury received significant support for the presidential nomination at the 1848 Democratic National Convention, particularly among New England delegates, but the nomination went to Lewis Cass of Michigan. Hoping to be nominated in 1852, Woodbury encouraged his friends in the Democratic Party to promote his candidacy and was positioned to be a compromise candidate at the 1852 Democratic National Convention before his failing health deprived him of his chance. Woodbury died in Portsmouth on September 4 of an inflammatory tumor in the stomach.

== Legacy ==
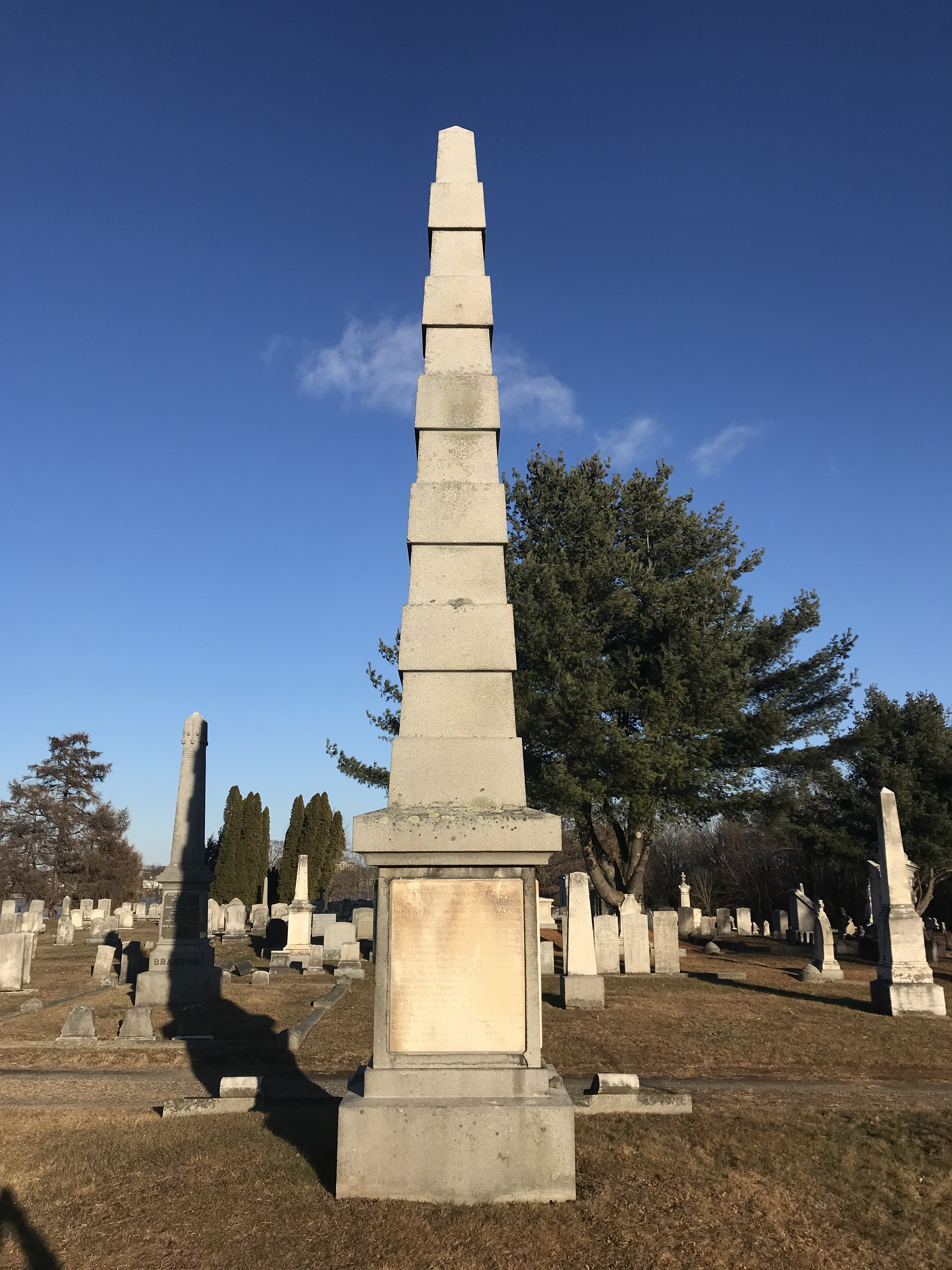
Woodbury's gravesite

Woodbury is one of the few individuals to have held a constitutional office in all three branches of the U.S. government and one of seven people to have held a constitutional office in all three branches and also having served as a U.S. governor. Named in his honor are Woodbury County, Iowa; Woodbury, Minnesota; Woodbury, Tennessee; Woodbury Avenue in Portsmouth, New Hampshire; Woodbury School in Salem, New Hampshire; and several ships called the USS Woodbury. He is featured on a New Hampshire historical marker (number 43) along New Hampshire Route 136 in Francestown. His daughter Mary married Montgomery Blair, Abraham Lincoln's Postmaster General. His son Charles L. Woodbury was a lawyer who served as United States Attorney for the District of Massachusetts and served on the New Hampshire House of Representatives and the Massachusetts General Court.

== Works ==
- Political, Judicial, and Literary Writings (edited by N. Capen, Boston, 1852)

== See also ==
- Harrison Gray Dyar
- Levi Woodbury Homestead
- List of justices of the Supreme Court of the United States

== Notes ==
Party political offices
Preceded by Samuel Dinsmoor	Democratic-Republican nominee for Governor of New Hampshire; 1824	Succeeded by None
Political offices
Preceded by Samuel Bell	Governor of New Hampshire; 1823–1824	Succeeded by David Morril
Preceded by Edmund Parker	Speaker of the New Hampshire House of Representatives; 1825	Succeeded by Henry Hubbard
Preceded by John Branch	United States Secretary of the Navy; 1831–1834	Succeeded by Mahlon Dickerson
Preceded by Roger Taney	United States Secretary of the Treasury; 1834–1841	Succeeded by Thomas Ewing
U.S. Senate
Preceded by John Parrott	U.S. senator (Class 3) from New Hampshire; 1825–1831; Served alongside: Samuel Bell	Succeeded by Isaac Hill
Preceded by Josiah S. Johnston	Chair of the Senate Commerce Committee; 1827–1831	Succeeded by John Forsyth
Preceded by Henry Hubbard	U.S. senator (Class 2) from New Hampshire; 1841–1845; Served alongside: Franklin Pierce, Leonard Wilcox, Charles Atherton	Succeeded by Benning Jenness
Preceded by George Evans	Chair of the Senate Finance Committee; 1845	Succeeded by John Calhoun
Legal offices
Preceded by Joseph Story	Associate Justice of the Supreme Court of the United States; 1845–1851	Succeeded by Benjamin Curtis
