= Aaron Draper Shattuck =

American painter

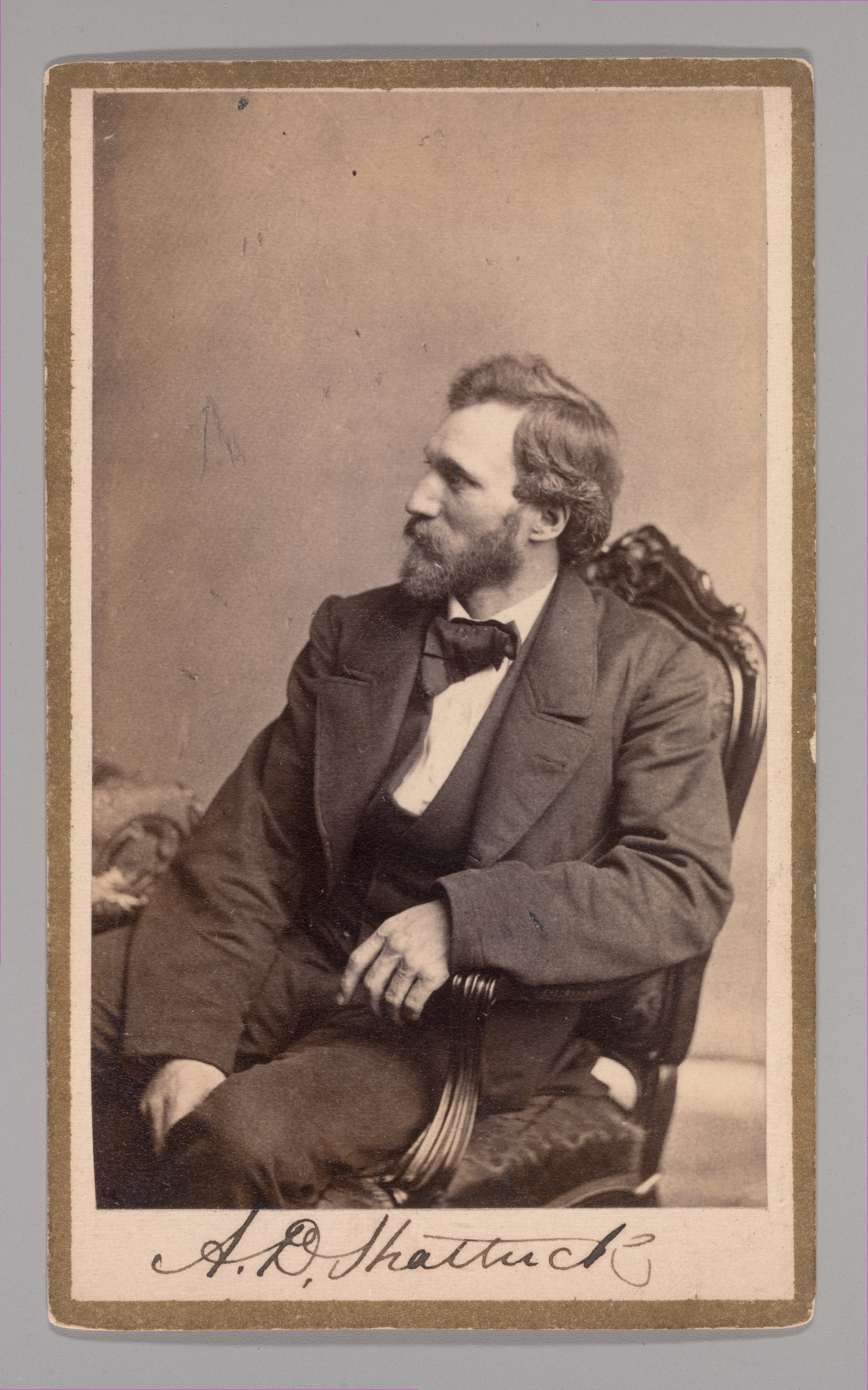
- Born: March 9, 1832; Francestown, New Hampshire, US
- Died: July 30, 1928 (aged 96); Granby, Connecticut, US
- Education: White Mountain School; National Academy of Design
- Spouse: Marian Colman

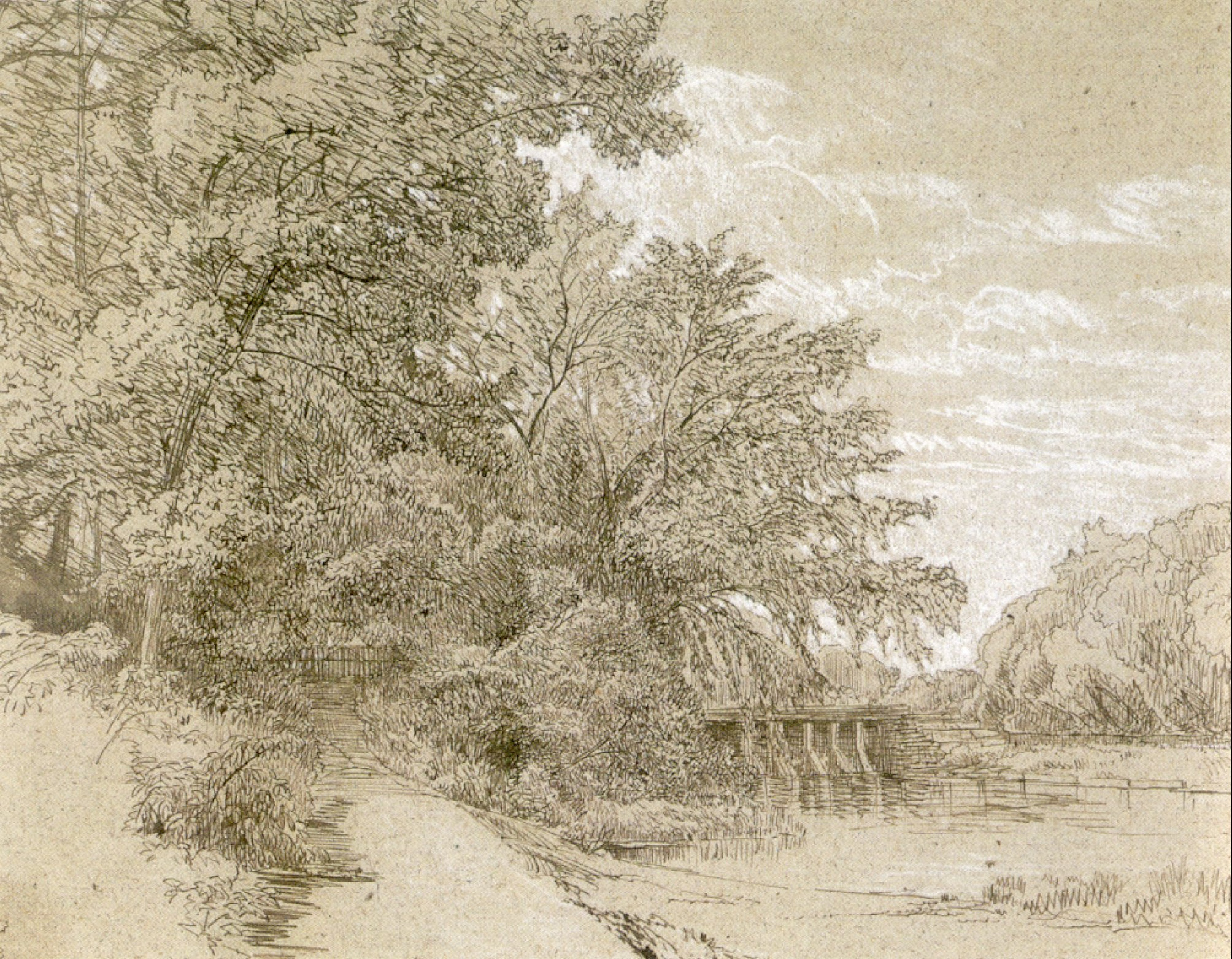
Tariffville, Connecticut, Farmington River, ink with white heightening by Aaron Draper Shattuck, 1867, Honolulu Museum of Art

Aaron Draper Shattuck (March 9, 1832 – July 30, 1928) was an American painter of the White Mountain School. He was born in Francestown, New Hampshire. Growing up during the civil war. He and his brothers/colleagues, helped the effort of the North with their considerable creativity and imagination, by creating propaganda. A second-generation artist affiliated with the Hudson River School, Shattuck differed from most of his contemporaries in that he never studied abroad, and appears to have spent his entire life in New England.

Shattuck studied portrait painting with Alexander Ransom in Boston in 1851, and in 1852 was a student at the National Academy of Design in New York City. In 1854 he first painted in the White Mountains of New Hampshire. The following year he exhibited for the first time at both the National Academy and the Boston Athenaeum. In 1856 he was elected an associate of the National Academy, and was made a full Academician in 1861.

From 1856 to 1870 Shattuck worked at the Tenth Street Studio Building in New York City. In 1860 he married Marian Colman, sister of Samuel Colman. In 1879 he moved to West Granby, Connecticut, where his paintings focused on his farm and its animals. In 1883 he invented a canvas stretcher bar key which was used by artists of the era, and which contributed to Shattuck's considerable wealth.

In 1888 Shattuck suffered the effects of a serious illness, after which he ceased to paint. After recovering he followed other agrarian and creative pursuits, raising sheep, experimenting with apple tree grafts, and making violins. Prior to his death in 1928 at the age of 96 he was the oldest living member of the National Academy of Design.
