= Bennington, New Hampshire =

- Town
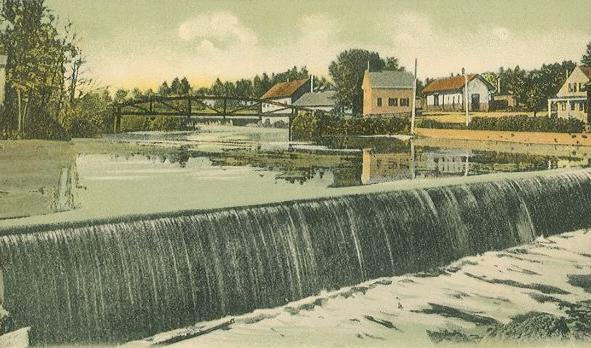
- Great Falls, Contoocook River, c. 1905

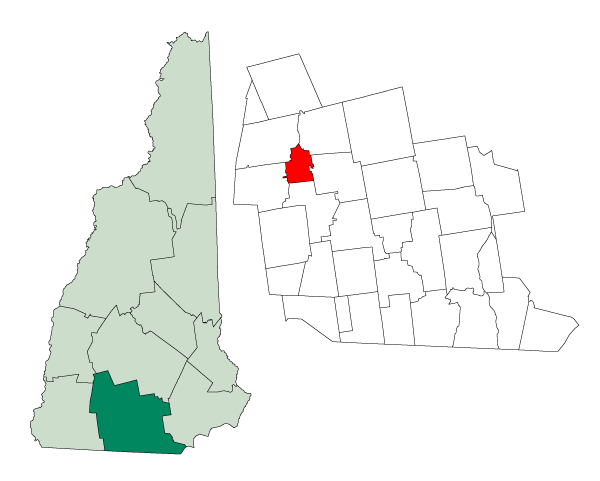
- Location in Hillsborough County, New Hampshire
- Coordinates: 43°00′15″N 71°53′28″W
- Country: United States
- State: New Hampshire
- County: Hillsborough
- Incorporated: 1842

Area
  - Total: 11.6 sq mi (30.0 km^{2})
  - Land: 11.4 sq mi (29.4 km^{2})
  - Water: 0.23 sq mi (0.6 km^{2}) 1.94%
- Elevation: 876 ft (267 m)

Population (2020)
  - Total: 1,501
  - Density: 130/sq mi (51/km^{2})
- Time zone: UTC-5 (Eastern)
  - Summer (DST): UTC-4 (Eastern)
- ZIP code: 03442
- Area code: 603
- FIPS code: 33-04900
- GNIS feature ID: 873543
- Website: www.townofbennington.com

Bennington is a town in Hillsborough County, New Hampshire, United States. The population was 1,501 at the 2020 census.

The main village of the town, where 338 people resided at the 2020 census, is defined as the Bennington census-designated place (CDP) and is located on the Contoocook River at the intersection of New Hampshire routes 31 and 47.

== History ==
Situated in an area once called "Society Land", the town was formed from parts of Deering, Francestown, Greenfield and Hancock. It was named to commemorate the 1777 Battle of Bennington, an American Revolutionary War battle fought in New York near Bennington, Vermont. The Vermont town in turn derived its name from New Hampshire governor Benning Wentworth. The town was incorporated in 1842. The first census, taken in 1850, recorded 541 residents.

Located at the Great Falls of the Contoocook River, which drop 70 feet (21 m) over 1.2 miles (1.9 km), Bennington provided water power for mills. The first gristmill was built in 1782, with a cotton mill in 1810. A tannery and tool manufacturing industry would follow. A factory with paper-making machinery was established in 1835, located at or near the site of the present-day Monadnock Paper Mill. In 1858, the town's industries included a cutlery manufacturer, a gristmill, two paper mills, and a sawmill. Bennington also had quite a number of farms.

In 1874, plans were underway to build the Peterborough and Hillsborough railroad through Bennington.

== Geography ==
According to the United States Census Bureau, the town has a total area of 11.6 square miles (30.0 km^{2}), of which 11.4 square miles (29.4 km^{2}) are land and 0.2 square miles (0.6 km^{2}) are water, comprising 1.94% of the town. Bennington is drained by the north-flowing Contoocook River, which forms Powder Mill Pond on the southern boundary. The highest point in Bennington is 2,020 feet (620 m) above sea level on Crotched Mountain, whose 2,066-foot (630 m) summit lies just east in Francestown. Bennington lies fully within the Merrimack River watershed.

=== Transportation ===
The town is crossed by U. S. Route 202 and state routes 31 and 47. It is bordered by the towns of Deering to the northeast, Francestown to the east, Greenfield to the south, Hancock to the southwest, and Antrim to the west and north.

=== Adjacent municipalities ===
- Antrim (north)
- Deering (northeast)
- Francestown (east)
- Greenfield (south)
- Hancock (west)

== Demographics ==
Historical population
Census	Pop.	Note	%±
1850	541		—
1860	450		−16.8%
1870	401		−10.9%
1880	443		10.5%
1890	542		22.3%
1900	667		23.1%
1910	690		3.4%
1920	568		−17.7%
1930	552		−2.8%
1940	655		18.7%
1950	593		−9.5%
1960	591		−0.3%
1970	639		8.1%
1980	890		39.3%
1990	1,236		38.9%
2000	1,401		13.3%
2010	1,476		5.4%
2020	1,501		1.7%
2024 (est.)	1,507		0.4%
U.S. Decennial Census

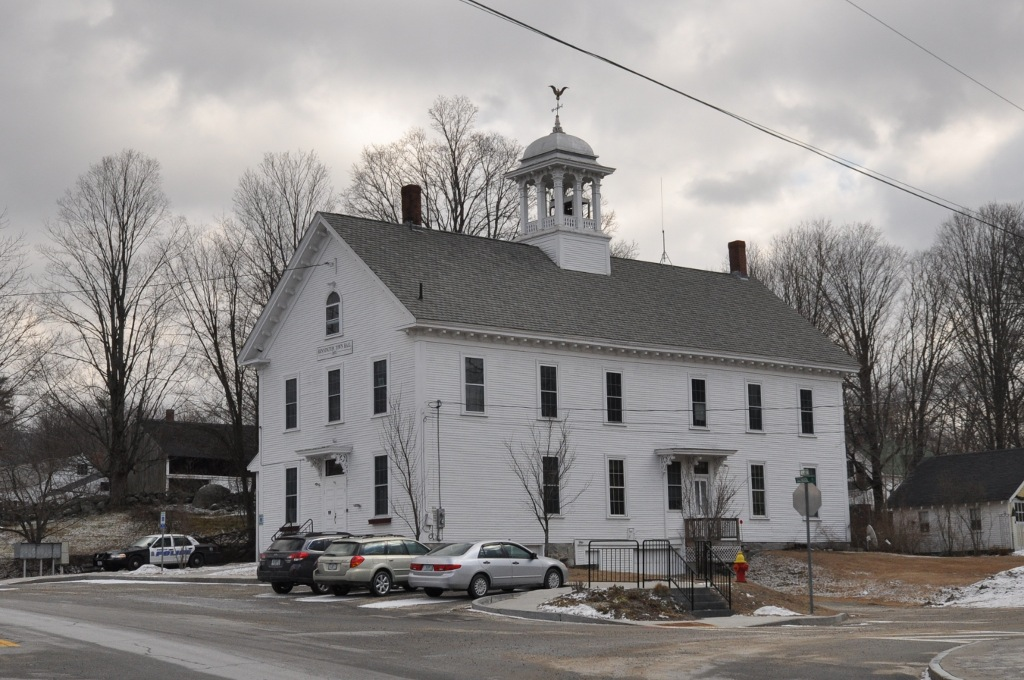
Town Hall

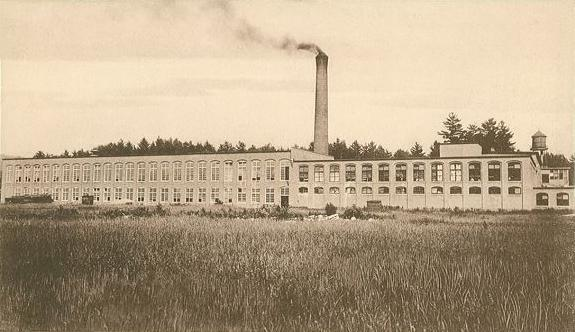
Monadnock Paper Mill c. 1910

As of the census of 2010, there were 1,476 people, 564 households, and 386 families residing in the town. There were 666 housing units, of which 102, or 15.3%, were vacant. 43 of the vacant units were for seasonal or recreational use. The racial makeup of the town was 97.4% white, 0.4% African American, 0.1% Native American, 0.6% Asian, 0.0% Native Hawaiian or Pacific Islander, 0.4% some other race, and 1.1% from two or more races. 0.9% of the population were Hispanic or Latino of any race.

Of the 564 households, 35.8% had children under the age of 18 living with them, 49.6% were headed by married couples living together, 13.5% had a female householder with no husband present, and 31.6% were non-families. 24.3% of all households were made up of individuals, and 5.8% were someone living alone who was 65 years of age or older. The average household size was 2.62, and the average family size was 3.08.

In the town, 25.7% of the population were under the age of 18, 9.6% were from 18 to 24, 26.3% from 25 to 44, 29.6% from 45 to 64, and 8.9% were 65 years of age or older. The median age was 38.3 years. For every 100 females, there were 107.3 males. For every 100 females age 18 and over, there were 107.0 males.

For the period 2011–2015, the estimated median annual income for a household was $65,481, and the median income for a family was $75,278. Male full-time workers had a median income of $47,000 versus $39,659 for females. The per capita income for the town was $28,071. 4.5% of the population and 4.5% of families were below the poverty line. 2.0% of the population under the age of 18 and 2.4% of those 65 or older were living in poverty.

== Economy ==
Bennington is the home of the Monadnock Paper Mills as well as Crotched Mountain Ski & Ride, a medium-sized ski resort on the Francestown line.

== Education ==
Bennington is part of SAU (School Administrative Unit) #1, which is a school district that includes 9 towns, better known as the Contoocook Valley Regional School District. Students from Bennington attend the following schools:

- Elementary: Pierce School, located in Bennington
- Middle: Great Brook School, located in Antrim
- High: ConVal Regional High School, located in Peterborough
