= Francestown, New Hampshire =

- Town
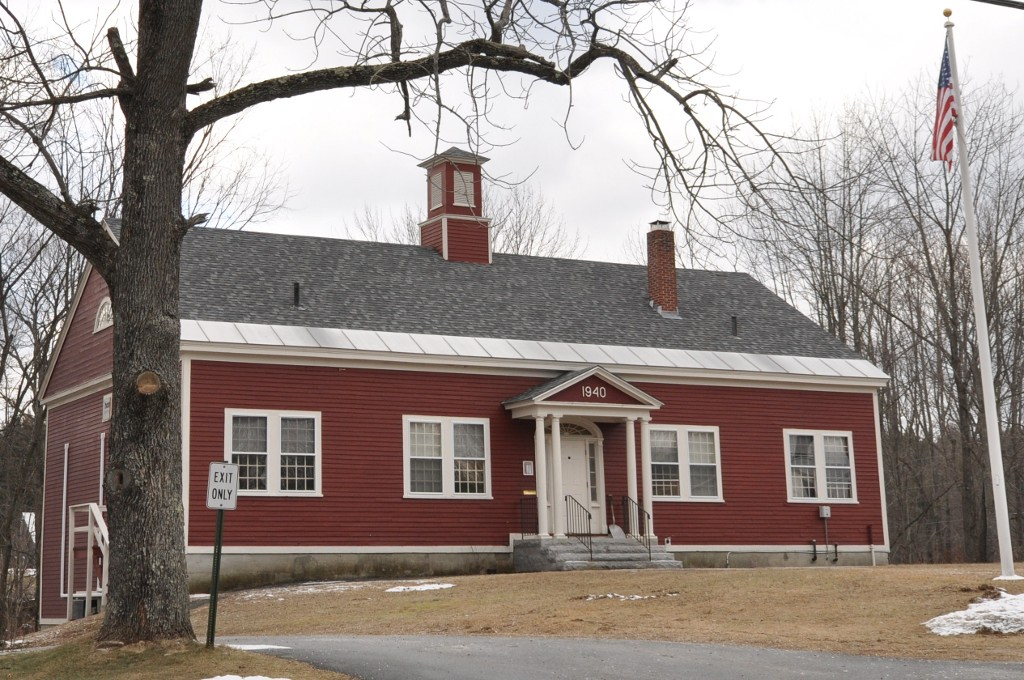
- Town hall

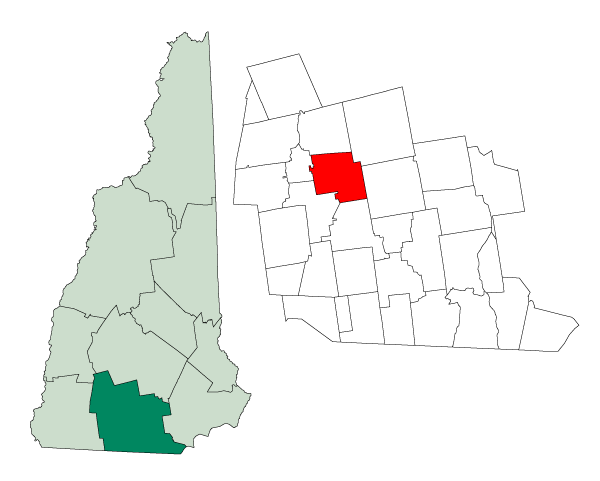
- Location in Hillsborough County, New Hampshire
- Coordinates: 42°59′45″N 71°49′25″W
- Country: United States
- State: New Hampshire
- County: Hillsborough
- Incorporated: 1772

Area
  - Total: 30.4 sq mi (78.7 km^{2})
  - Land: 29.8 sq mi (77.2 km^{2})
  - Water: 0.58 sq mi (1.5 km^{2}) 1.85%
- Elevation: 912 ft (278 m)

Population (2020)
  - Total: 1,610
  - Density: 54/sq mi (20.9/km^{2})
- Time zone: UTC-5 (Eastern)
  - Summer (DST): UTC-4 (Eastern)
- ZIP code: 03043
- Area code: 603
- FIPS code: 33-27140
- GNIS feature ID: 873598
- Website: www.francestownnh.org

Francestown is a town in Hillsborough County, New Hampshire, United States. The population was 1,610 at the 2020 census. The village of Francestown, population 201 in 2020, is in the center of the town.

== History ==
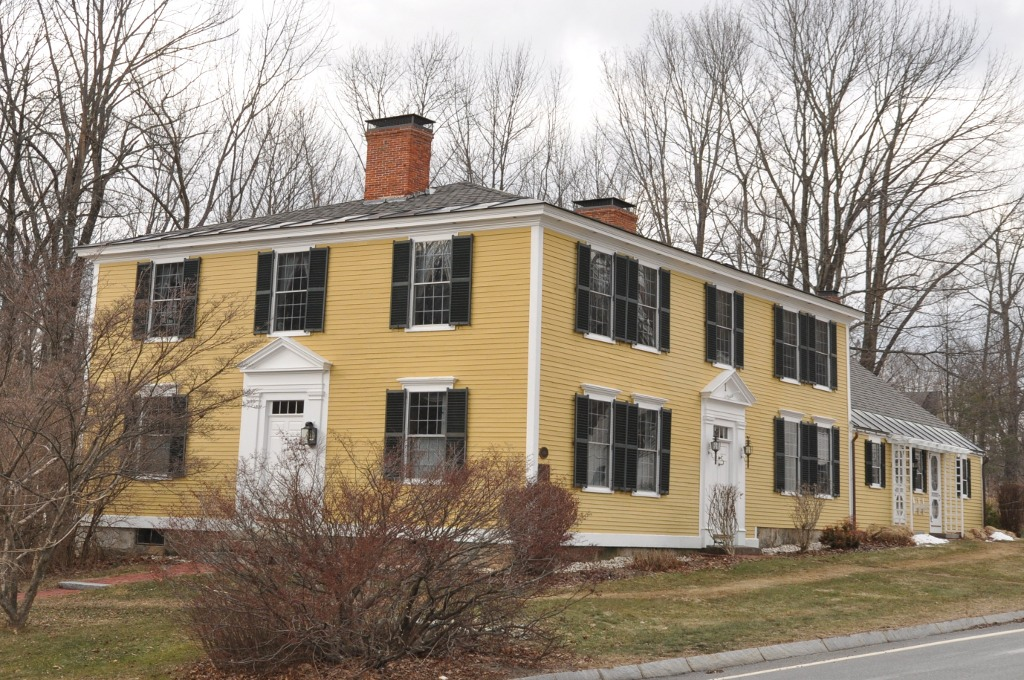
Levi Woodbury Homestead

Incorporated in 1772, Francestown takes its name from Frances Deering Wentworth, the wife of colonial governor John Wentworth. There were 928 residents when the first census was taken in 1790. For some time the town used its location on the Second New Hampshire Turnpike, the only route between Boston and Vermont, to collect a toll of one cent per mile from coaches and wagons. High-quality soapstone was mined in Francestown from 1792 to 1912.

== Geography ==
According to the United States Census Bureau, the town has a total area of 30.4 square miles (78.7 km^{2}), of which 29.8 square miles (77.2 km^{2}) are land and 0.58 square miles (1.5 km^{2}) are water, making up 1.85% of the town. The highest point in Francestown is the summit of Crotched Mountain, at 2,066 feet (630 m) above sea level, on the town's western border. Francestown lies fully within the Merrimack River watershed, entirely via tributaries of the Piscataquog River. The town is crossed by state routes 47 and 136.

== Demographics ==
Historical population
Census	Pop.	Note	%±
1790	982		—
1800	1,355		38.0%
1810	1,451		7.1%
1820	1,479		1.9%
1830	1,540		4.1%
1840	1,308		−15.1%
1850	1,114		−14.8%
1860	1,082		−2.9%
1870	932		−13.9%
1880	937		0.5%
1890	837		−10.7%
1900	693		−17.2%
1910	602		−13.1%
1920	385		−36.0%
1930	363		−5.7%
1940	342		−5.8%
1950	405		18.4%
1960	495		22.2%
1970	525		6.1%
1980	830		58.1%
1990	1,217		46.6%
2000	1,480		21.6%
2010	1,562		5.5%
2020	1,610		3.1%
2024 (est.)	1,645		2.2%
U.S. Decennial Census

=== 2000 ===
As of the census of 2000, there were 1,480 people, 552 households, and 418 families residing in the town. The population density was 49.1 inhabitants per square mile (19.0/km^{2}). There were 656 housing units at an average density of 21.7 per square mile (8.4/km^{2}). The racial makeup of the town was 97.30% White, 0.07% African American, 0.34% Native American, 0.27% Asian, 0.47% from other races, and 1.55% from two or more races. Hispanic or Latino of any race were 0.54% of the population.

There were 552 households, out of which 34.6% had children under the age of 18 living with them, 66.8% were married couples living together, 6.0% had a female householder with no husband present, and 24.1% were non-families. 17.0% of all households were made up of individuals, and 6.3% had someone living alone who was 65 years of age or older. The average household size was 2.68 and the average family size was 3.04.

In the town, the population was spread out, with 27.4% under the age of 18, 4.1% from 18 to 24, 28.7% from 25 to 44, 28.0% from 45 to 64, and 11.9% who were 65 years of age or older. The median age was 40 years. For every 100 females, there were 103.9 males. For every 100 females age 18 and over, there were 99.8 males.

The median income for a household in the town was $64,259, and the median income for a family was $71,471. Males had a median income of $50,521 versus $32,778 for females. The per capita income for the town was $28,942. About 1.2% of families and 3.0% of the population were below the poverty line, including 2.5% of those under age 18 and 3.5% of those age 65 or over.

=== 2020 ===
Between the 2010 and 2020 census, the population of Francestown increased from 1,562 to 1,610 residents. There were 624 households and 740 total housing units, with 93 vacant housing units. Of the 1,610 residents, the median household income was $102,721, compared with $83,626 for Hillsborough County. The poverty level was 2.8%, and exclusively effected residents over the age of 18. Of the 66% employment rate, 60.9% of workers were employed at private companies, 20.2% were self employed, 6.9% were employed as private non-profits, and 12% were employed by local, state, and federal government entities.

== Notable people ==
- Samuel Bell (1770–1850), 14th governor of New Hampshire
- James Wallace Black (1825–1896), photographer
- Titus Brown (1786–1849), US congressman
- Benjamin Pierce Cheney (1815–1895), businessman
- Ellen Cheney Johnson (1829–1899), prison reformer
- Sylvester H. Roper (1823–1896), inventor of the shotgun choke
- Aaron Draper Shattuck (1832–1928), White Mountain School painter
- Wallace Tripp (1940–2018), illustrator
- Eri D. Woodbury (1837–1928), awarded the Medal of Honor for his actions during the Civil War
- Levi Woodbury (1789–1851), associate justice of the Supreme Court of the United States; 15th governor of New Hampshire

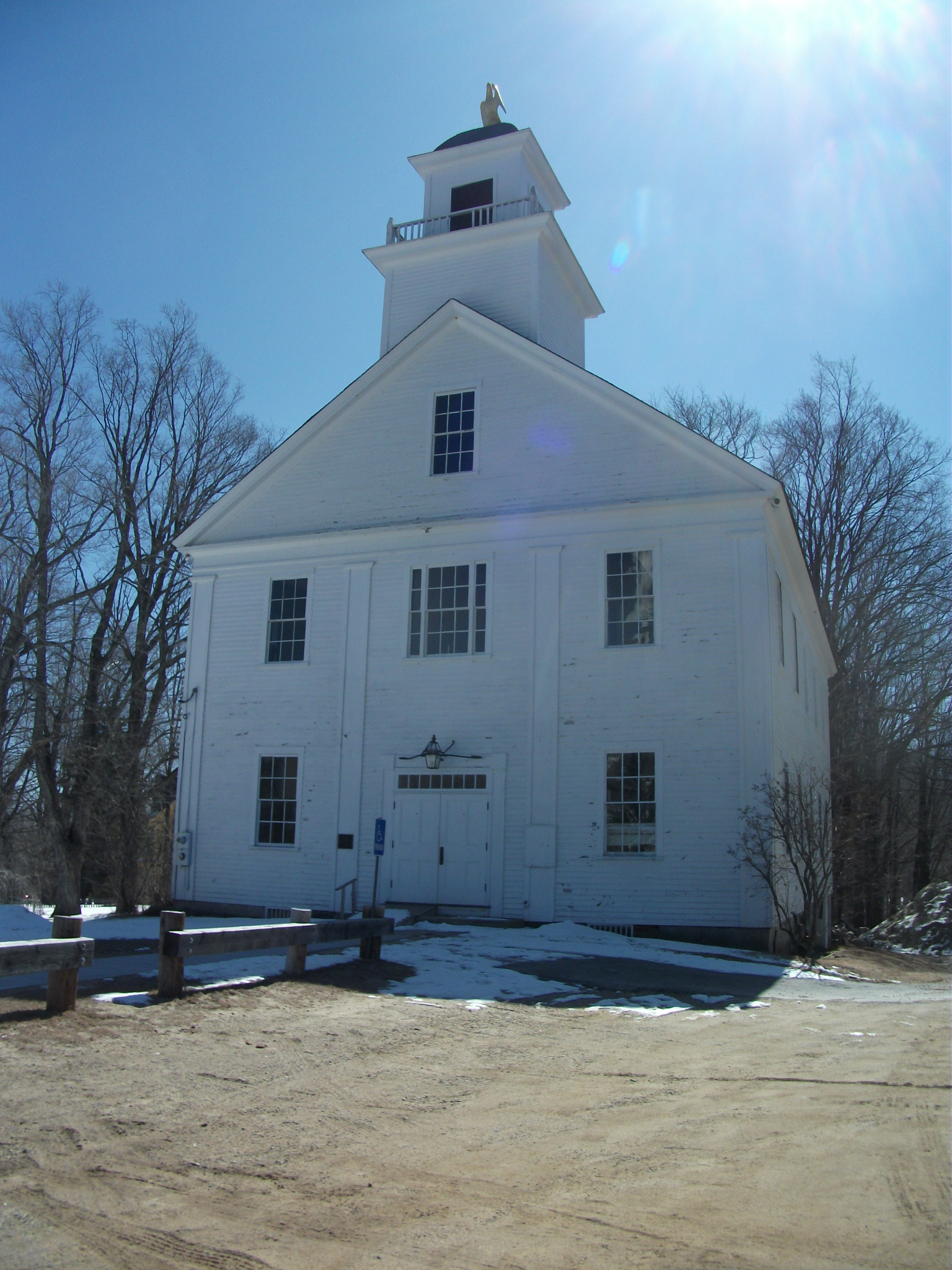
Old Francestown Town Hall and Historic District

== Notable buildings ==
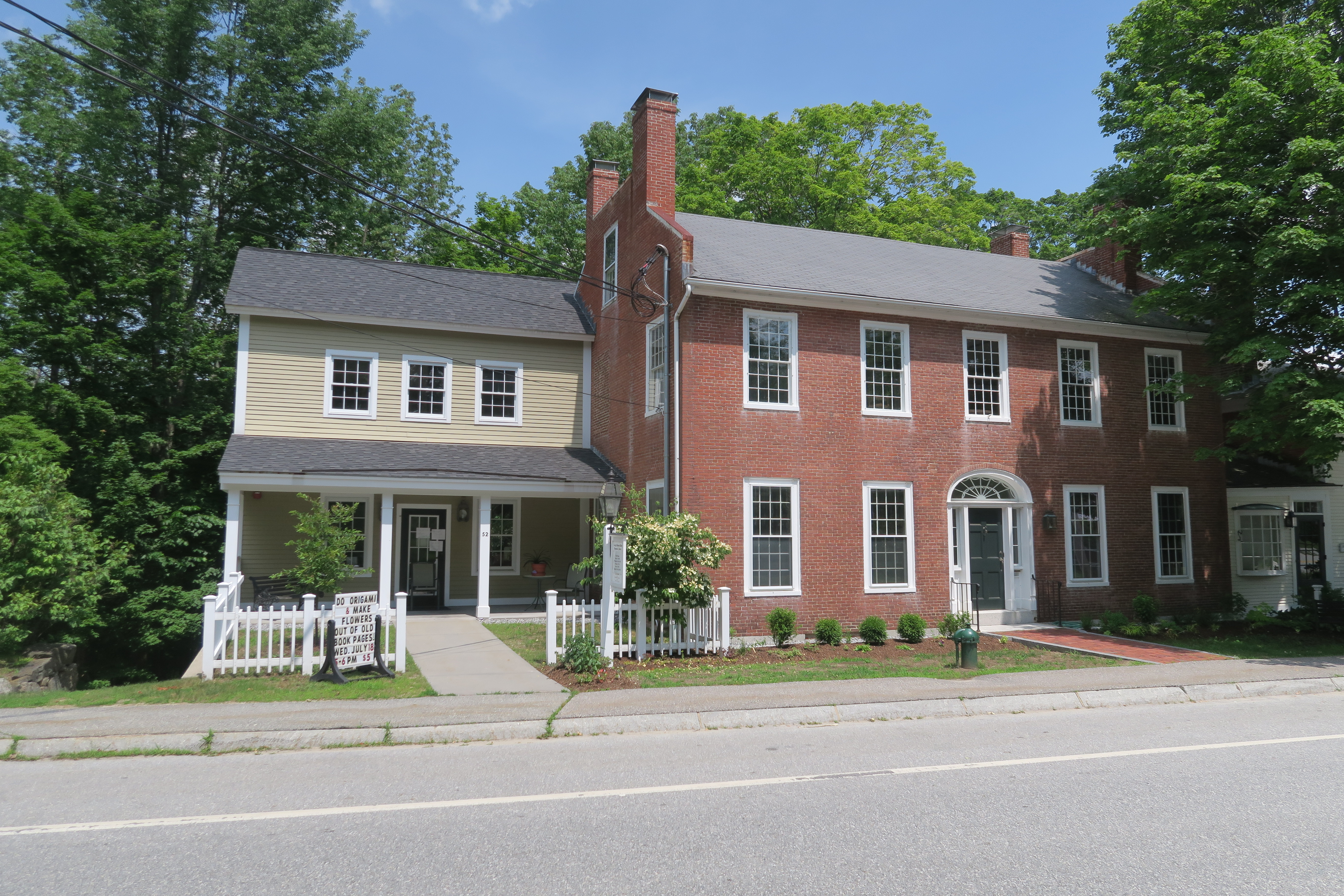
George Holmes Bixby Memorial Library. Located at 52 Main St, Francestown, NH.

- Francestown Meetinghouse
- Francestown Town Hall and Academy and Town Common Historic District
- Levi Woodbury Homestead
- George Holmes Bixby Memorial Library
