= New Hampshire Route 47 =

State highway in Hillsborough County, New Hampshire, US

New Hampshire Route 47
- Map of Hillsborough County in southern New Hampshire with NH 47 highlighted in red

Route information
- Maintained by NHDOT
- Length: 7.148 mi (11.504 km)

Major junctions
- South end: NH 136 in Francestown
- North end: NH 31 in Bennington

Location
- Country: United States
- State: New Hampshire
- Counties: Hillsborough

Highway system
- New Hampshire Highway System; Interstate; US; State; Turnpikes
| ← NH 45 | → NH 49 |

New Hampshire Route 47 (abbreviated NH 47) is a 7.148-mile-long (11.504 km) state highway in southern New Hampshire, United States. It runs from Francestown to Bennington. It is signed as a north–south route, but follows more of an east–west routing. In fact, during its "northernmost" (westernmost) 2.4 miles, it proceeds southwest while signed north (and vice versa).

NH 47 essentially functions as a northern bypass of New Hampshire Route 31 and New Hampshire Route 136, which pass through (and intersect in) Greenfield. Between this intersection and NH 47's endpoints, the three routes form a complete loop.

== Route description ==
NH 47 begins at an intersection with NH 136 in Francestown. It proceeds generally northwest out of town and crosses into Bennington. The route reaches its northernmost point about two miles east of town, before turning southwest (while still signed northbound) for the remainder of its route. NH 47 ends at the intersection with NH 31 in the center of town.

== Junction list ==
The entire route is in Hillsborough County.

| Location | mi | km | Destinations | Notes |
|---|---|---|---|---|
| Francestown | 0.000 | 0.000 | NH 136 (Greenfield Road/New Boston Road) – Greenfield, New Boston | Southern terminus |
| Bennington | 7.148 | 11.504 | NH 31 (Main Street) – Greenfield, Antrim, Peterborough | Northern terminus |
1.000 mi = 1.609 km; 1.000 km = 0.621 mi: Concurrency terminus

== Road names ==
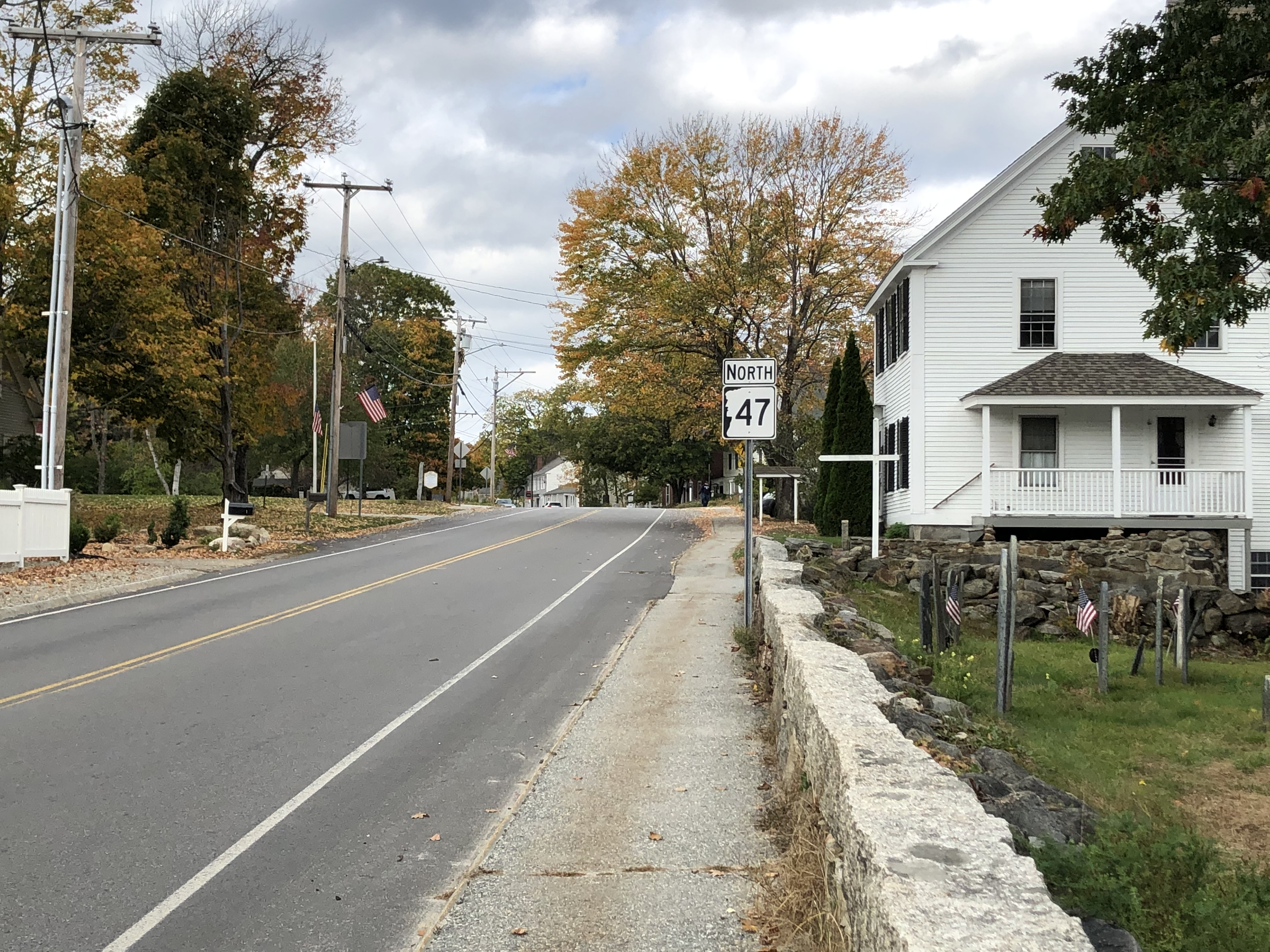
NH 47 at its start in Francestown

Route 47 uses the following local road names:

Bennington

- Pierce Road
- School Street
- Francestown Road

Francestown

- Bennington Road
- Second New Hampshire Turnpike
- Main Street
