= Francestown Meetinghouse =

Historic church in New Hampshire, United States

- U.S. National Register of Historic Places
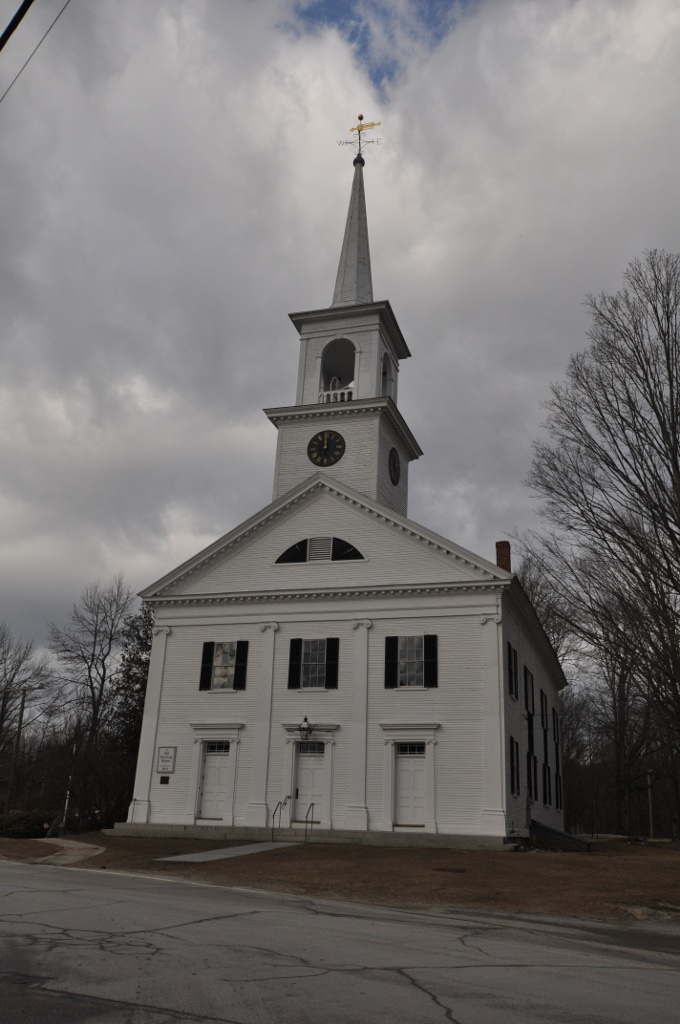

- Location within New Hampshire Location within the United States
- Location: NH 136, Francestown, New Hampshire
- Coordinates: 42°59′14″N 71°48′46″W
- Area: 0.5 acres (0.20 ha)
- Built: 1803; 1837
- Architect: Patch, Isaac; Patch, William
- Architectural style: Greek Revival
- NRHP reference No.: 99000667
- Added to NRHP: June 14, 1999

The Francestown Meetinghouse is a historic meeting house on Route 136 in the center of Francestown, New Hampshire. The white clapboarded building was built c. 1801–03, and rebuilt in 1837, at which time it received its Greek Revival styling. It was used as a church until 1987, and for town meetings until 1833. The building was listed on the National Register of Historic Places in 1999. It is now managed by a nonprofit as a community resource.

== Description and history ==
The Francestown Meetinghouse is prominently set in the village center of Francestown, on the east side of the triangular junction of Main Street with New Boston and Greenfield roads. It is a two-story wood-frame structure, with a gabled roof and clapboarded exterior. Its main facade resembles a Greek temple front, with four Doric pilasters rising two stories to an entablature and triangular pediment with semi-elliptical fan in the tympanum. Its tower has two square stages topped by a steeple, with a town-owned clock in the first stage, and an open belfry in the second, with round-arch openings.

Francestown's first meetinghouse stood near this site, and was built between 1801 and 1803, due to the cost involved to the relatively poor community. It served both Congregationalist and Presbyterian congregations (who shared the publicly funded minister) until 1825, when a new Calvinist congregation objected to a tax-funded minister. The town auctioned off its share of the building in 1833, and its ownership came to the Congregationalists. A schism in the congregation led to court action in 1877, the result of which was the eviction of the congregation by the society that was judged to own the building. The building continued to be used predominantly for religious services until 1987, when it was sold to a local non-profit as a community center.

== See also ==
- National Register of Historic Places listings in Hillsborough County, New Hampshire
