= Antrim (CDP), New Hampshire =

Census-designated place in New Hampshire, United States

Antrim, New Hampshire
- Census-designated place
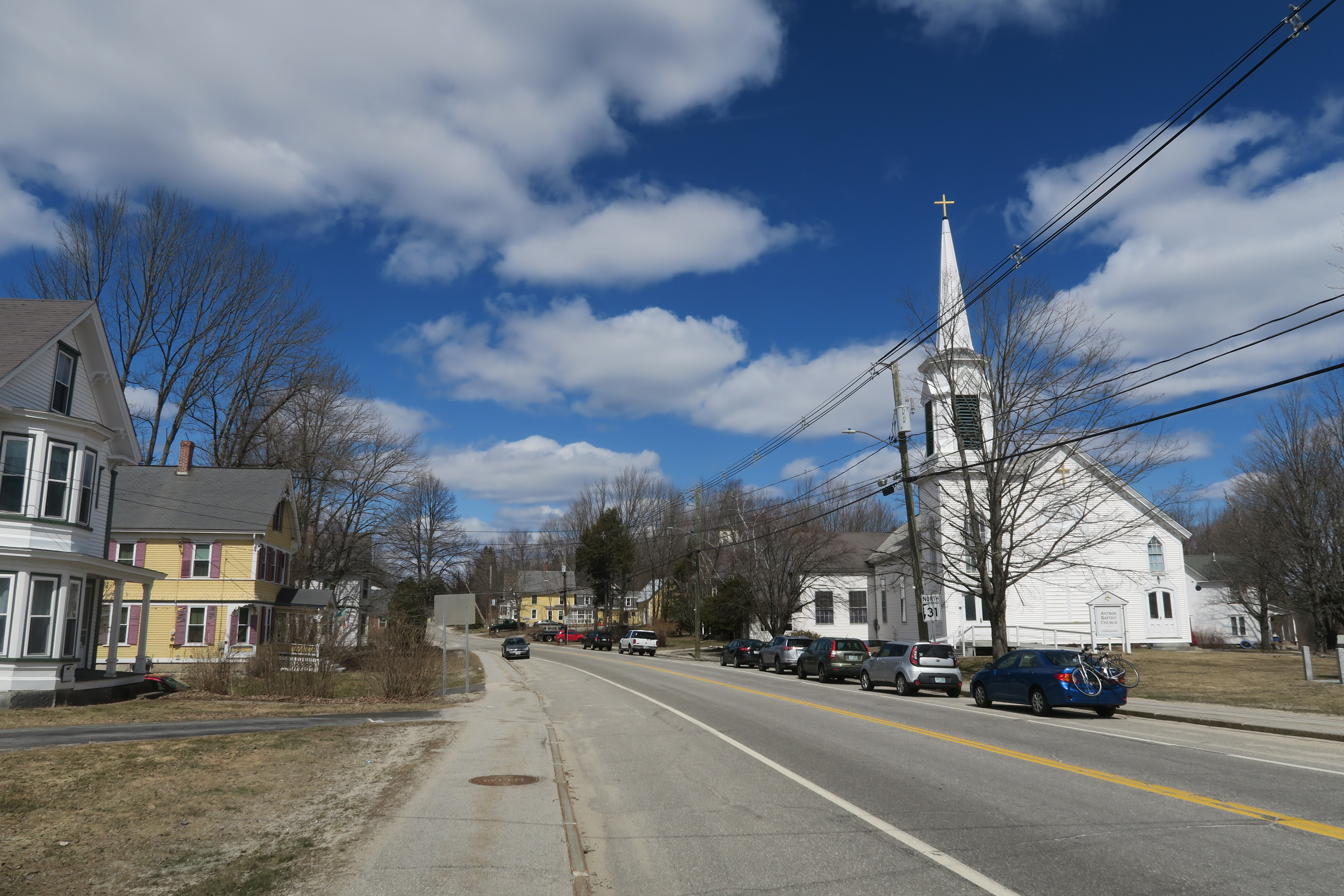
- NH Route 31 northbound in Antrim

- Location within New Hampshire Location within the United States
- Coordinates: 43°1′44″N 71°56′17″W
- Country: United States
- State: New Hampshire
- County: Hillsborough
- Town: Antrim

Area
  - Total: 4.55 sq mi (11.79 km^{2})
  - Land: 4.54 sq mi (11.77 km^{2})
  - Water: 0.0077 sq mi (0.02 km^{2})
- Elevation: 709 ft (216 m)

Population (2020)
  - Total: 1,395
  - Density: 307/sq mi (118.5/km^{2})
- Time zone: UTC-5 (Eastern (EST))
  - Summer (DST): UTC-4 (EDT)
- ZIP code: 03440
- Area code: 603
- FIPS code: 33-01620
- GNIS feature ID: 2378053

Antrim is a census-designated place (CDP) and the main village in the town of Antrim, New Hampshire, United States. The population of the CDP was 1,395 at the 2020 census, out of 2,651 in the entire town.

== Geography ==
The CDP is in the southeastern corner of the town of Antrim, bordered to the east by the Contoocook River, which forms the Bennington town line, and to the south by the towns of Bennington and Hancock. The CDP is bordered to the west by Old Hancock Road and New Hampshire Route 31 (Clinton Road), and to the north by Miltmore Road, Smith Road, and Cochran Brook. Antrim village is in the southern part of the CDP, and the western part includes portions of the villages of Antrim Center and Clinton Village.

U.S. Route 202 is the main road through the community, leading north 7 miles (11 km) to Hillsborough and south 12 miles (19 km) to Peterborough. New Hampshire Route 31 leads northwest from Antrim village through Clinton Village and Antrim Center, and ultimately 26 miles (42 km) to its northern terminus, in Goshen.

According to the U.S. Census Bureau, the Antrim CDP has a total area of 4.6 square miles (11.8 km^{2}), of which 0.01 square miles (0.02 km^{2}), or 0.17%, are water.

== Demographics ==
Historical population
Census	Pop.	Note	%±
1980	1,142		—
1990	1,325		16.0%
2000	1,389		4.8%
2010	1,397		0.6%
2020	1,395		−0.1%
U.S. Decennial Census

As of the census of 2010, there were 1,397 people, 561 households, and 364 families residing in the CDP. There were 607 housing units, of which 46, or 7.6%, were vacant. The racial makeup of the CDP was 97.1% white, 0.3% African American, 0.4% Native American, 0.6% Asian, 0.0% Pacific Islander, 0.0% some other race, and 1.6% from two or more races. 1.4% of the population were Hispanic or Latino of any race.

Of the 561 households in the CDP, 35.5% had children under the age of 18 living with them, 48.0% were headed by married couples living together, 11.4% had a female householder with no husband present, and 35.1% were non-families. 28.2% of all households were made up of individuals, and 12.3% were someone living alone who was 65 years of age or older. The average household size was 2.46, and the average family size was 2.99.

24.1% of residents in the CDP were under the age of 18, 8.0% were from age 18 to 24, 24.1% were from 25 to 44, 29.9% were from 45 to 64, and 13.8% were 65 years of age or older. The median age was 41.4 years. For every 100 females, there were 92.2 males. For every 100 females aged 18 and over, there were 90.0 males.

For the period 2011–15, the estimated median annual income for a household was $55,703, and the median income for a family was $78,906. The per capita income for the CDP was $25,266. 9.1% of the population and 3.3% of families were below the poverty line, along with 10.6% of people under the age of 18 and 3.4% of people 65 or older.
