= Powder Mill Pond =

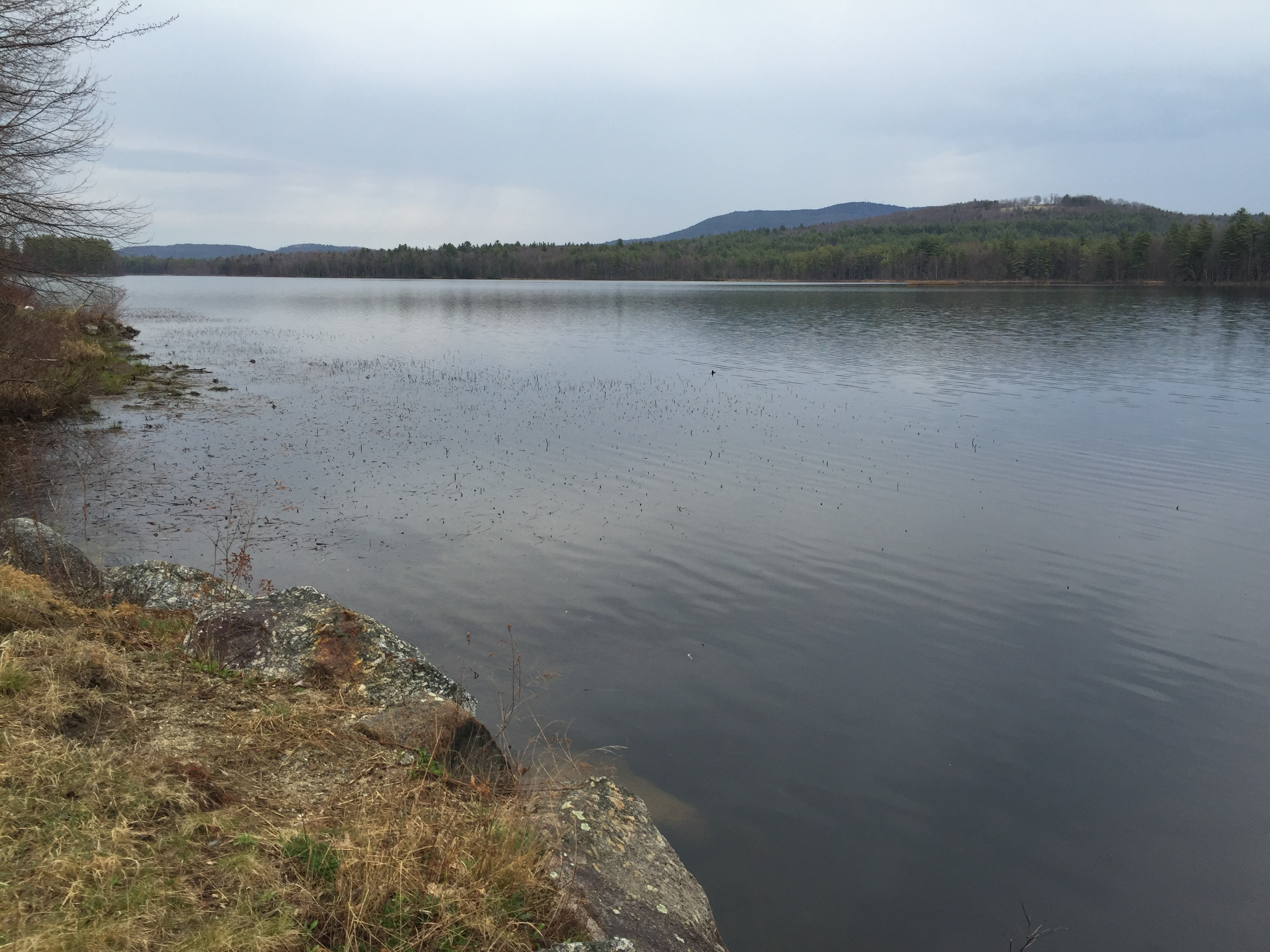
- Looking east across the southern part of the pond; view from S. Elmwood Rd. in Hancock, NH

- Location within New Hampshire Location within the United States
- Location: Hillsborough County, New Hampshire
- Coordinates: 42°58′10″N 71°55′57″W
- Type: Reservoir
- Primary inflows: Contoocook River
- Primary outflows: Contoocook River
- Basin countries: United States
- Max. length: 2.6 mi (4.2 km)
- Max. width: 0.5 mi (0.80 km)
- Surface area: 419 acres (1.70 km^{2})
- Average depth: 3 ft (0.91 m)
- Max. depth: 17 ft (5.2 m)
- Surface elevation: 677 ft (206 m)
- Settlements: Bennington; Hancock; Greenfield

Powder Mill Pond is a 419-acre (1.70 km^{2}) impoundment on the Contoocook River in Hillsborough County in southern New Hampshire, United States. The pond's dam is located in the town of Bennington, with water impounded into the towns of Hancock and Greenfield.

The lake is classified as a warmwater fishery, with observed species including smallmouth and largemouth bass, chain pickerel, horned pout, black crappie, and bluegill.

== See also ==
- List of lakes in New Hampshire
