= Farwell School =

- U.S. National Register of Historic Places
- U.S. Historic district – Contributing property
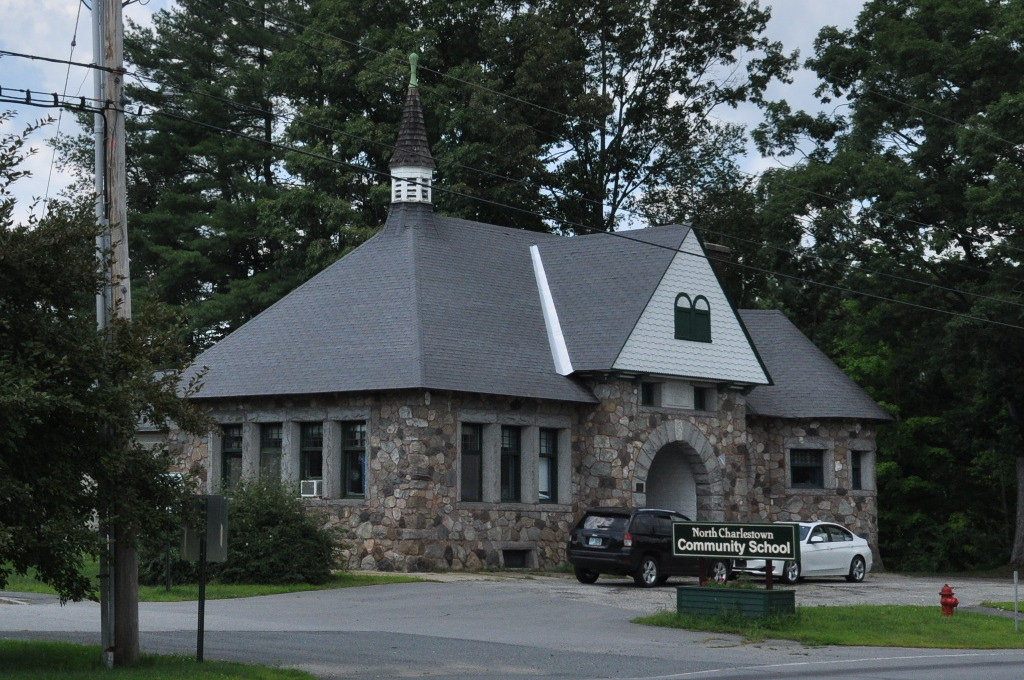

- Location within New Hampshire Location within the United States
- Location: 509 River Rd. (NH 12A), Charlestown, New Hampshire
- Coordinates: 43°18′35″N 72°23′17″W
- Area: less than one acre
- Built: 1889
- Built by: Beckwith, Hira
- Architect: Ward & McFarland
- Architectural style: Romanesque
- Part of: North Charlestown Historic District (ID05000768)
- NRHP reference No.: 90001847

Significant dates
- Added to NRHP: December 6, 1990
- Designated CP: June 9, 2005

The Farwell School is a historic school building at 509 River Road (New Hampshire Route 12A) in the North Charlestown village of Charlestown, New Hampshire. Built in 1890, it is one of two Romanesque Revival buildings in the town, and the only one executed in stone. The building was listed on the National Register of Historic Places in 1990. It is now part of the North Charlestown Community School.

== Description and history ==
The Farwell School stands in the village of North Charlestown, on the west side of River Road (NH 12A) south of its junction with Ox Brook Road. It is a single-story stone structure, built out of rusticated granite and covered by a hip roof. The right side has a rounded single-story turret, and the peak of the ridge has a small belfry at its left end. A gabled pavilion projects slightly from the center of the front facade, with the entry recessed under a rounded archway, and a clapboarded gable finish above. A band of three casement windows extends to the left of the entrance, with a similar group of four on the left side. The building has been extended to its rear with more modern facilities.

The school was designed by the Detroit, Michigan firm of Ward & McFarland and built in 1890. It is one of two Romanesque Revival buildings in the town, and the only one executed in stone. The school was paid for by Jesse Farwell, a Detroit businessman born in Charlestown, who also contributed to the cost of land acquisition. The building was maintained for many years by a community trust established by the Farwells.

== See also ==
- National Register of Historic Places listings in Sullivan County, New Hampshire
