= North Charlestown Historic District =

Historic district in New Hampshire, United States

- U.S. National Register of Historic Places
- U.S. Historic district
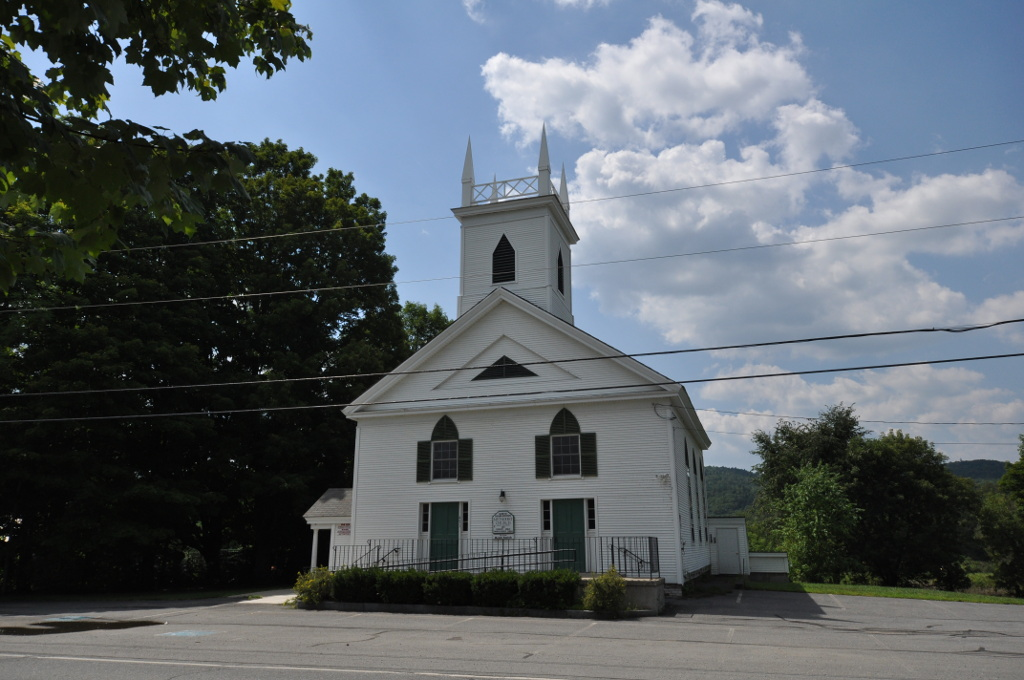

- Location within New Hampshire Location within the United States
- Location: River Rd., Charlestown, New Hampshire
- Coordinates: 43°18′39.0″N 72°23′16.4″W
- Area: 50 acres (20 ha)
- Architectural style: Colonial, Mid 19th Century Revival
- NRHP reference No.: 05000568
- Added to NRHP: June 9, 2005

The North Charlestown Historic District encompasses a 19th-century rural village in Charlestown, New Hampshire. Located about 5 miles (8 km) north of the town's center, the district includes a small cluster of buildings along New Hampshire Route 12A (River Road) that is a remnant portion of a larger agricultural village. First settled in the 1750s, the oldest buildings in the district date to the 1790s, and most of the major buildings were built in the 19th century. Its economy was based on lumber (supported by a mill on the Little Sugar River) and farming. The village was once considered a much larger, dispersed settlement, but construction of New Hampshire Route 11 in the 1960s separated some of the more remote parts of the village from its nucleus, which was bypassed by that construction.

The district was listed on the National Register of Historic Places in 2005. It extends along NH 12A from its junction with Ox Brook Rooad south to the Little Sugar River, just north of its junction with Depot Hill Road. Notable buildings include the 1841 Greek Revival Methodist Church, the Union Hall/Grange Hall built in 1888, and the Farwell School, a stone building erected in 1889. Most of the district's buildings are wood-frame houses, although there are two of brick. Stylistically, they are typically vernacular expressions of Federal and Greek Revival architecture, although examples of Italianate and Second Empire architecture are also to be seen. The district also includes ruinous mill remnants on the Little Sugar River.

== See also ==
- National Register of Historic Places listings in Sullivan County, New Hampshire
