= Walpole (CDP), New Hampshire =

Census-designated place in New Hampshire, United States

Walpole, New Hampshire
- Census-designated place
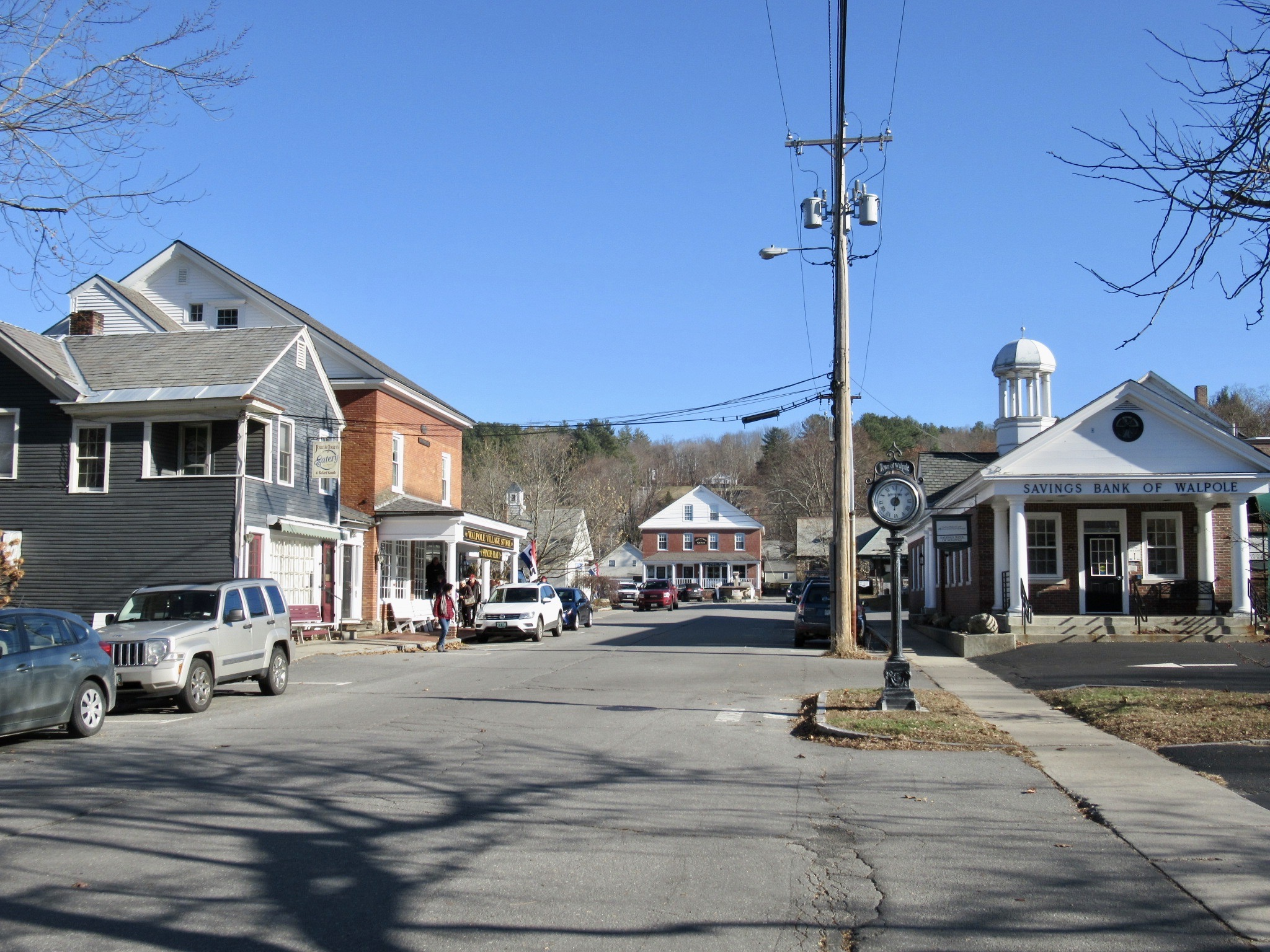
- Westminster Street in the center of Walpole

- Location within New Hampshire Location within the United States
- Coordinates: 43°04′45″N 72°25′25″W
- Country: United States
- State: New Hampshire
- County: Cheshire
- Town: Walpole

Area
  - Total: 1.23 sq mi (3.18 km^{2})
  - Land: 1.22 sq mi (3.15 km^{2})
  - Water: 0.012 sq mi (0.03 km^{2})
- Elevation: 417 ft (127 m)

Population (2020)
  - Total: 573
  - Density: 470.8/sq mi (181.77/km^{2})
- Time zone: UTC-5 (Eastern (EST))
  - Summer (DST): UTC-4 (EDT)
- ZIP code: 03608
- Area code: 603
- FIPS code: 33-78340
- GNIS feature ID: 2629744

Walpole is a census-designated place (CDP) and the central village in the town of Walpole, New Hampshire, United States. The population of the CDP was 573 at the 2020 census, compared to 3,633 in the entire town.

== Geography ==
The CDP is in the west-center part of the town of Walpole, on the east side of the valley of the Connecticut River. The western edge of the CDP follows New Hampshire Route 12, from the outlet of Mill Pond in the north to an unnamed brook south of South Street in the south. The CDP extends southeast to Prospect Hill Road as far as Watkins Hill Road and Maple Grove Road, while the eastern border of the CDP follows North Road and an unnamed brook back to Mill Pond.

Route 12 leads north 4.5 miles (7.2 km) to North Walpole, across the Connecticut River from Bellows Falls, Vermont, and 11 miles (18 km) to Charlestown, while to the south it leads 17 miles (27 km) to Keene. New Hampshire Route 123 leaves Route 12 just west of the town center and leads west across the Connecticut to Westminster, Vermont.

According to the U.S. Census Bureau, the Walpole CDP has a total area of 1.2 square miles (3.2 km^{2}), of which 0.01 square miles (0.03 km^{2}), or 0.86%, are water.

== Demographics ==
Historical population
Census	Pop.	Note	%±
2010	605		—
2020	573		−5.3%
U.S. Decennial Census

As of the census of 2010, there were 605 people, 315 households, and 163 families residing in the CDP. There were 346 housing units, of which 31, or 9.0%, were vacant. The racial makeup of the town was 97.2% White, 0.3% African American, 0.0% Native American, 0.8% Asian, 0.0% Pacific Islander, 0.0% some other race, and 1.7% from two or more races. 1.3% of the population were Hispanic or Latino of any race.

Of the 315 households in the CDP, 15.6% had children under the age of 18 living with them, 42.9% were headed by married couples living together, 7.0% had a female householder with no husband present, and 48.3% were non-families. 39.4% of all households were made up of individuals, and 18.4% were someone living alone who was 65 years of age or older. The average household size was 1.92, and the average family size was 2.54.

13.1% of people in the CDP were under the age of 18, 6.3% were from 18 to 24, 18.1% were from 25 to 44, 35.6% were from 45 to 64, and 26.9% were 65 years of age or older. The median age was 53.0 years. For every 100 females, there were 79.5 males. For every 100 females age 18 and over, there were 80.1 males.

For the period 2011–15, the estimated median annual income for a household was $46,061, and the median income for a family was $85,278. The per capita income for the CDP was $35,659.
