= NH 12 =

NH 12 may refer to:

- National Highway 12 (India)
- New Hampshire Route 12, United States
