= Drewsville Mansion =

Historic house in New Hampshire, United States

- U.S. National Register of Historic Places
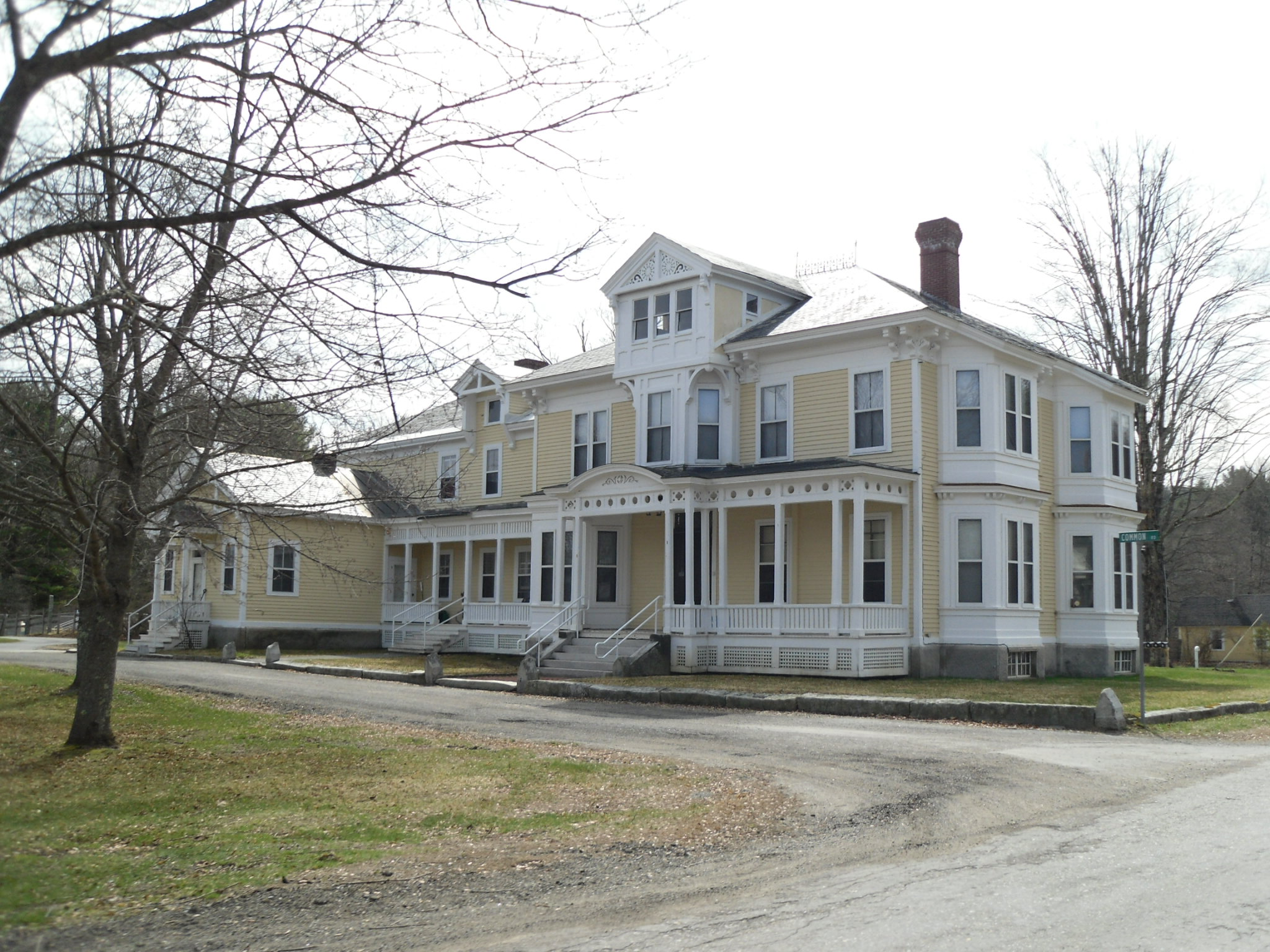

- Location within New Hampshire Location within the United States
- Location: Old Cheshire Trnpke., S end of Drewsville Village common, Walpole, New Hampshire
- Coordinates: 43°7′36″N 72°23′34″W
- Area: 3 acres (1.2 ha)
- Built: 1880
- Architect: William P. Wentworth
- Architectural style: Stick/eastlake
- NRHP reference No.: 96000953
- Added to NRHP: September 13, 1996

The Drewsville Mansion is a historic house on Old Cheshire Turnpike in the Drewsville village of Walpole, New Hampshire, United States. Built in 1880, it is a regionally rare example of vernacular Stick/Eastlake style architecture, located in an area that has predominantly even older buildings. The building was listed on the National Register of Historic Places in 1996.

== Description and history ==
The Drewsville Mansion is sited prominently at the southern end of the Drewsville village green, on the east side of Old Cheshire Turnpike. It is a rambling 2 1/2-story wood-frame structure with a clapboarded exterior and hip roof. The main facade is sheltered by a single-story porch with a jigsaw-cut decorative frieze, and a second-story bay projects over the porch above the main entrance. This bay has decorative stickwork and curving brackets. The interior of the house has retained much of its original finish, despite being subdivided into apartments and suffering fire damage in one wing.

The mansion was built in 1880 for Bolivar and Sarah Lathrop Lovell. It was probably designed by William P. Wentworth of Boston, Massachusetts, who is credited with a small number of similar Stick-style buildings in Walpole which were built about the same time. Sarah Lathrop Lovell's father was a local sheriff, postmaster, and hotel operator, and was one of Drewsville's wealthiest residents. Bolivar Lovell's father was a prominent lawyer and businessman from Alstead, New Hampshire. The property was sold out of the family by their daughter in 1910, and was subdivided into apartments through the mid-20th century.

== See also ==
- National Register of Historic Places listings in Cheshire County, New Hampshire
