= Unity, New Hampshire =

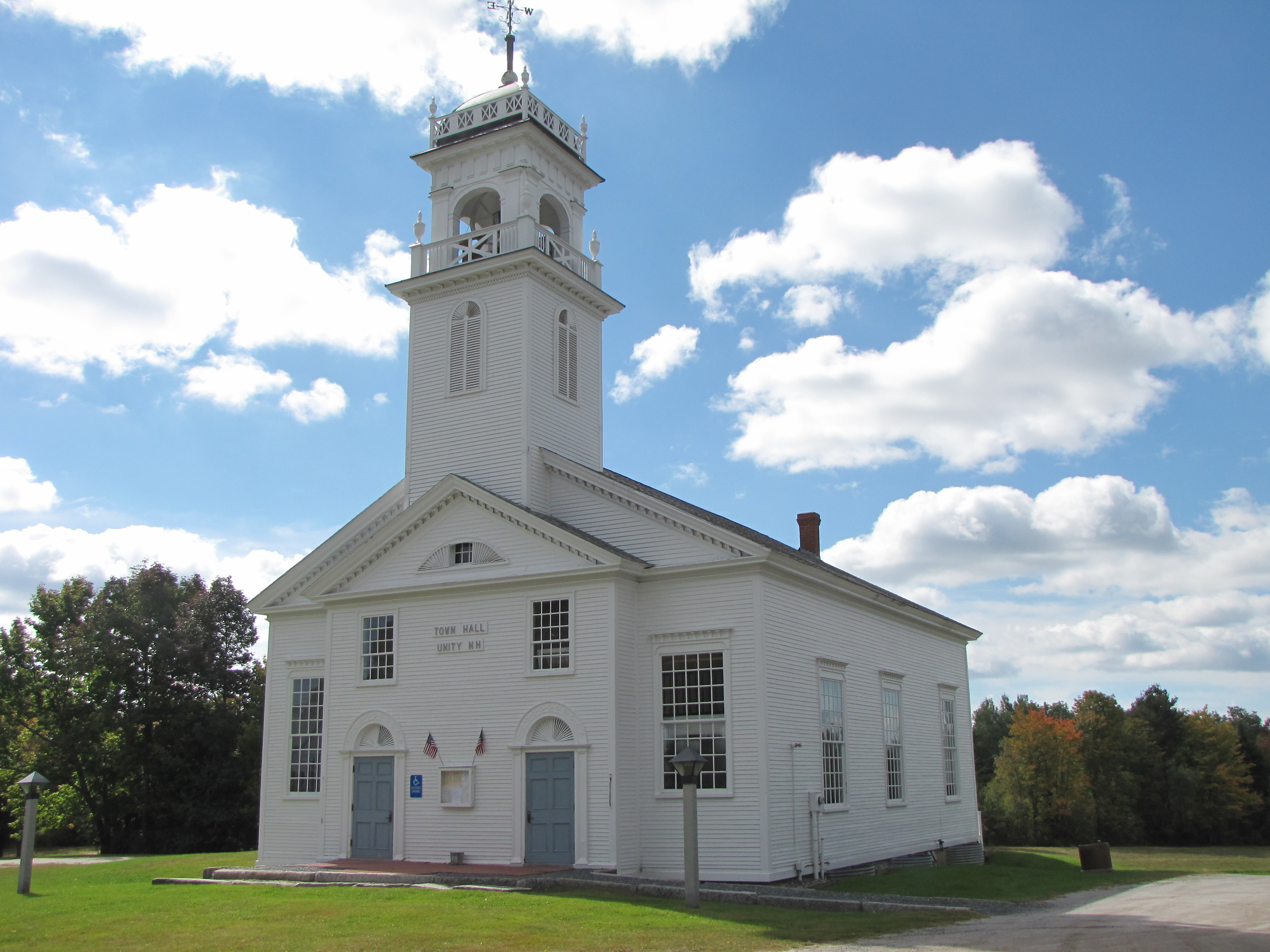
- Unity Town Hall

- Location in Sullivan County and the state of New Hampshire.
- Coordinates: 43°17′51″N 72°16′15″W
- Country: United States
- State: New Hampshire
- County: Sullivan
- Incorporated: 1764
- Villages: Unity; East Unity; Quaker City; West Unity

Area
  - Total: 37.20 sq mi (96.34 km^{2})
  - Land: 36.98 sq mi (95.78 km^{2})
  - Water: 0.22 sq mi (0.56 km^{2}) 0.58%
- Elevation: 1,522 ft (464 m)

Population (2020)
  - Total: 1,518
  - Density: 41/sq mi (15.8/km^{2})
- Time zone: UTC-5 (Eastern)
  - Summer (DST): UTC-4 (Eastern)
- ZIP Codes: 03603 (Charlestown); 03743 (Claremont); 03773 (Newport)
- Area code: 603
- FIPS code: 33-77940
- GNIS feature ID: 873742
- Website: www.townofunitynh.org

Unity is a town in Sullivan County, New Hampshire, United States. The population was 1,518 at the 2020 census, down from 1,671 at the 2010 census. The town includes the villages of Unity, East Unity, Quaker City, and West Unity.

== History ==
Prior to British colonization, the Connecticut River valley was populated by bands of the Western Abenaki, who lived in sometimes-large villages of longhouses. Depending on the season, they would either remain near their villages to fish, gather plants, engage in sugaring, and trade or fight with their neighbors, or head to nearby fowling and hunting grounds. Later, they also farmed tobacco and the "three sisters": corn, beans, and squash.

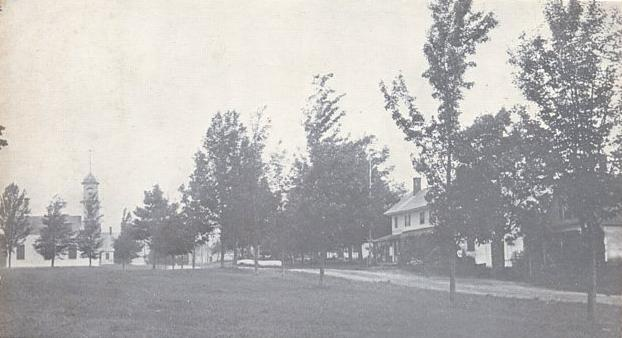
The Common c. 1904

Colonization eventually resulted in the establishment of the Province of New Hampshire. Within that province, the area that is now Unity was part of a territory chartered in 1753 and named "Buckingham" after John Hobart, 1st Earl of Buckinghamshire. Grants in the area were given by both the early Massachusetts government and by Governor Benning Wentworth, which led to disputes. The town was incorporated as "Unity" in 1764 after amicable resolutions of the disputes were reached.

In the 1790 census, the town had 538 residents. Unity was on the Second New Hampshire Turnpike, an important trade route chartered in 1799 that connected Amherst, New Hampshire, to Claremont. By 1810, the town had 1,044 inhabitants, with two grain mills, five sawmills, a clothing mill and a distillery. Sheep farming was a principal business.

=== 2008 presidential politics ===
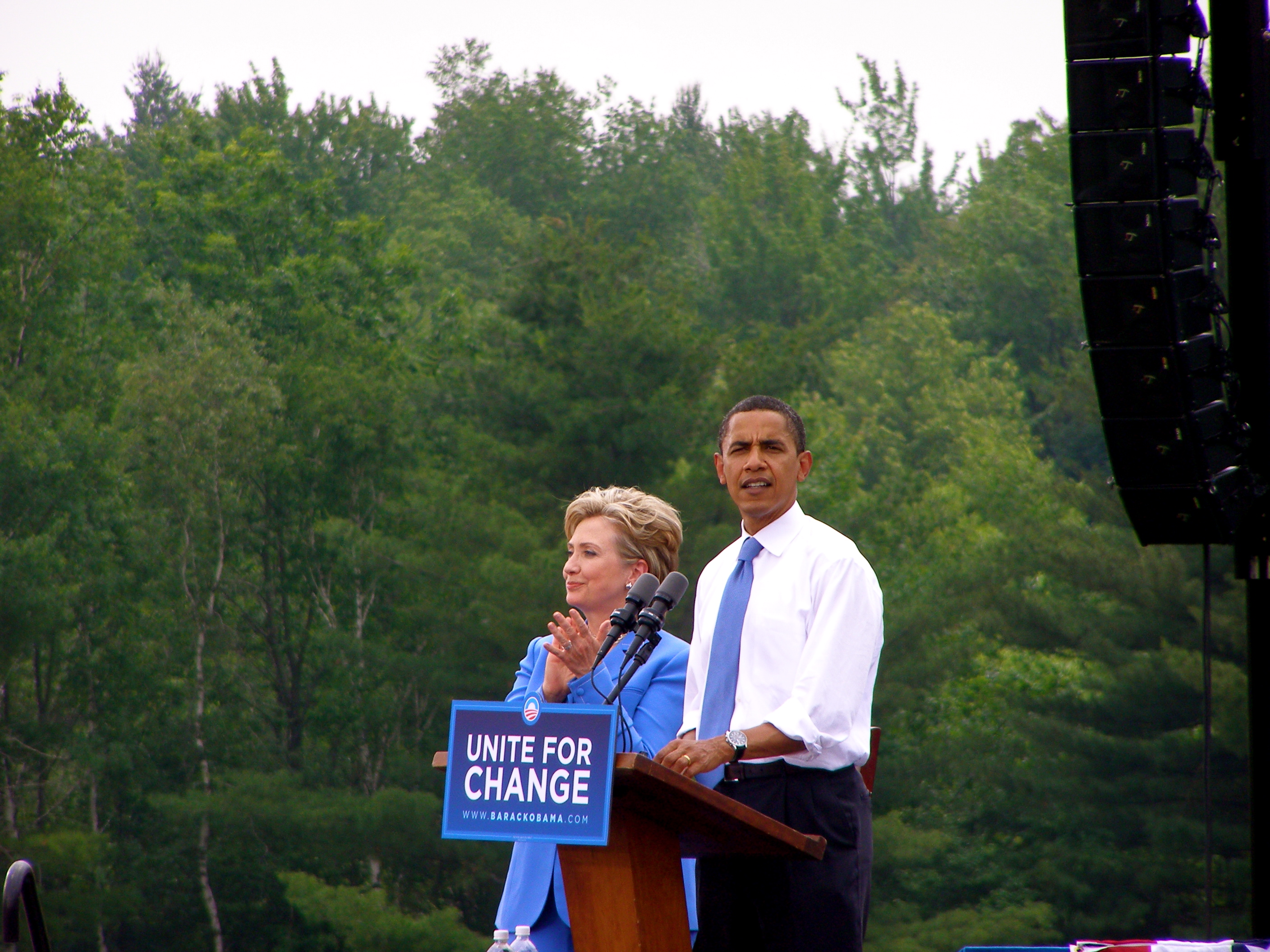
"Unite for Change" Rally

On June 27, 2008, presidential candidate Barack Obama and former rival Hillary Clinton appeared together in Unity at their first public event since Clinton pulled out of the race to be the Democratic presidential candidate. Unity was reportedly chosen because of the town's name and because, in the 2008 primary, Obama and Clinton each received 107 votes from Unity citizens.

== Geography ==
According to the U.S. Census Bureau, the town has a total area of 37.2 square miles (96.3 km^{2}), of which 37.0 square miles (95.8 km^{2}) are land and 0.2 square miles (0.6 km^{2}) are water, comprising 0.58% of the town. Unity is entirely within the Connecticut River watershed. The western and central part of town is drained by the Little Sugar River, leading to the Connecticut at North Charlestown, while the northwestern corner and eastern end of the town are drained by tributaries of the Sugar River, which flows to the Connecticut in Claremont. Crescent Lake, lying along the town's southern border, is the source of the Cold River, which reaches the Connecticut River at North Walpole.

The highest point in Unity is an unnamed summit along the town's northern boundary, with an elevation of 2,011 feet (613 m) above sea level.

=== Adjacent municipalities ===
- Newport (northeast)
- Goshen (east)
- Lempster (southeast)
- Acworth (southwest)
- Charlestown (west)
- Claremont (northwest)

== Demographics ==
Historical population
Census	Pop.	Note	%±
1790	538		—
1800	902		67.7%
1810	1,044		15.7%
1820	1,277		22.3%
1830	1,258		−1.5%
1840	1,218		−3.2%
1850	961		−21.1%
1860	887		−7.7%
1870	844		−4.8%
1880	814		−3.6%
1890	653		−19.8%
1900	572		−12.4%
1910	504		−11.9%
1920	522		3.6%
1930	501		−4.0%
1940	669		33.5%
1950	653		−2.4%
1960	708		8.4%
1970	709		0.1%
1980	1,092		54.0%
1990	1,341		22.8%
2000	1,530		14.1%
2010	1,671		9.2%
2020	1,518		−9.2%
U.S. Decennial Census

As of the census of 2000, there were 1,530 people, 504 households, and 385 families residing in the town. The population density was 41.4 inhabitants per square mile (16.0/km^{2}). There were 594 housing units at an average density of 16.1 per square mile (6.2/km^{2}). The racial makeup of the town was 99.35% White, 0.07% African American, 0.13% Asian, and 0.46% from two or more races. Hispanic or Latino of any race were 0.72% of the population.

There were 504 households, out of which 30.4% had children under the age of 18 living with them. 66.5% were married couples living together, 4.2% had a female householder with no husband present, and 23.6% were non-families. 17.1% of all households were made up of individuals, and 4.4% had someone living alone who was 65 years of age or older. The average household size was 2.59, and the average family size was 2.89.

In the town, the population was spread out, with 20.0% under the age of 18, 5.9% from 18 to 24, 27.5% from 25 to 44, 26.1% from 45 to 64, and 20.6% who were 65 years of age or older. The median age was 43 years. For every 100 females, there were 101.8 males. For every 100 females age 18 and over, there were 97.7 males.

The median income for a household in the town was $41,594, and the median income for a family was $47,045. Males had a median income of $31,199 versus $24,833 for females. The per capita income for the town was $17,908. About 6.8% of families and 8.1% of the population were below the poverty line, including 15.4% of those under age 18 and 1.4% of those age 65 or over.
