= Walpole Academy =

- U.S. National Register of Historic Places
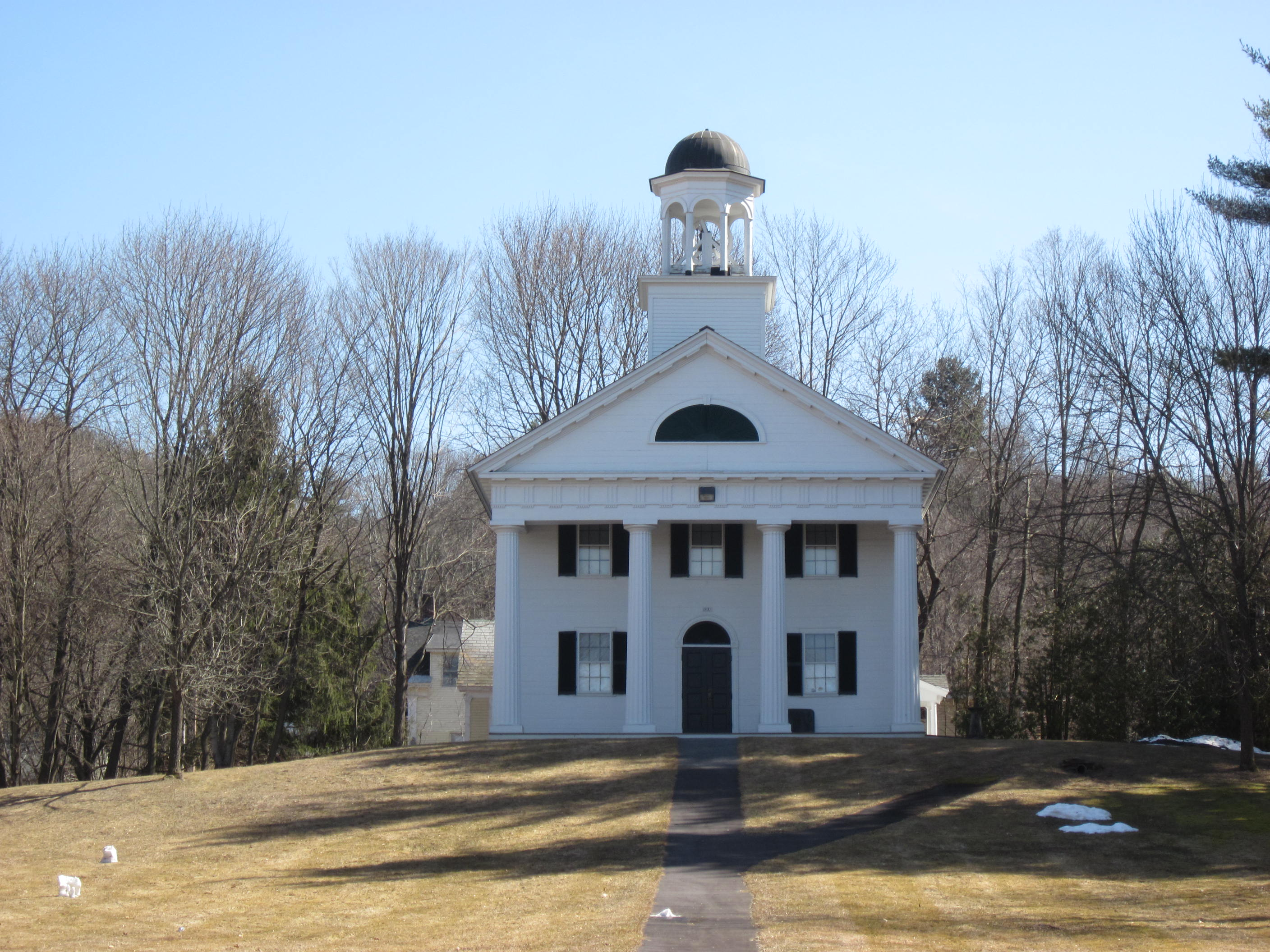

- Location within New Hampshire Location within the United States
- Location: Main St., Walpole, New Hampshire
- Coordinates: 43.07890°N 72.42556°W
- Area: 1.5 acres (0.61 ha)
- Built: 1831
- Architect: Howland, Aaron Prentiss
- Architectural style: Greek Revival
- NRHP reference No.: 75000230
- Added to NRHP: May 21, 1975

The Walpole Academy is a historic former school building on Main Street in Walpole, New Hampshire. It is now owned by the Walpole Historical Society and operated as a local history museum. Built in 1831, it is a fine rural example of a 19th-century Greek Revival academy building, which served the surrounding area as a private academy until 1853, and as Walpole's public high school until 1950. The building was listed on the National Register of Historic Places in 1975.

== Description and history ==
The former Walpole Academy building stands on the south side of Walpole's village center, set well back on the east side of Main Street. It is a 2 1/2-story wood-frame structure, covered with gabled roof and wooden clapboards. The building has a classic Greek temple appearance, with Doric columns supporting an entablature and a triangular pediment with a fanlight detail. The building is topped by an octagonal, arcaded cupola.

Walpole Academy was established as a private secondary school in 1825. The present building was erected in 1831, probably by Aaron Prentiss Howland, a local builder known for many local high quality Greek Revival designs. The academy remained private until 1853, when the town acquired it for use as its high school. It was purchased from the town by the historical society in 1950. The museum now houses items of local interest, including town records and historical artifacts.

== See also ==
- National Register of Historic Places listings in Cheshire County, New Hampshire
