= Peck-Porter House =

Historic house in New Hampshire, United States

- U.S. National Register of Historic Places
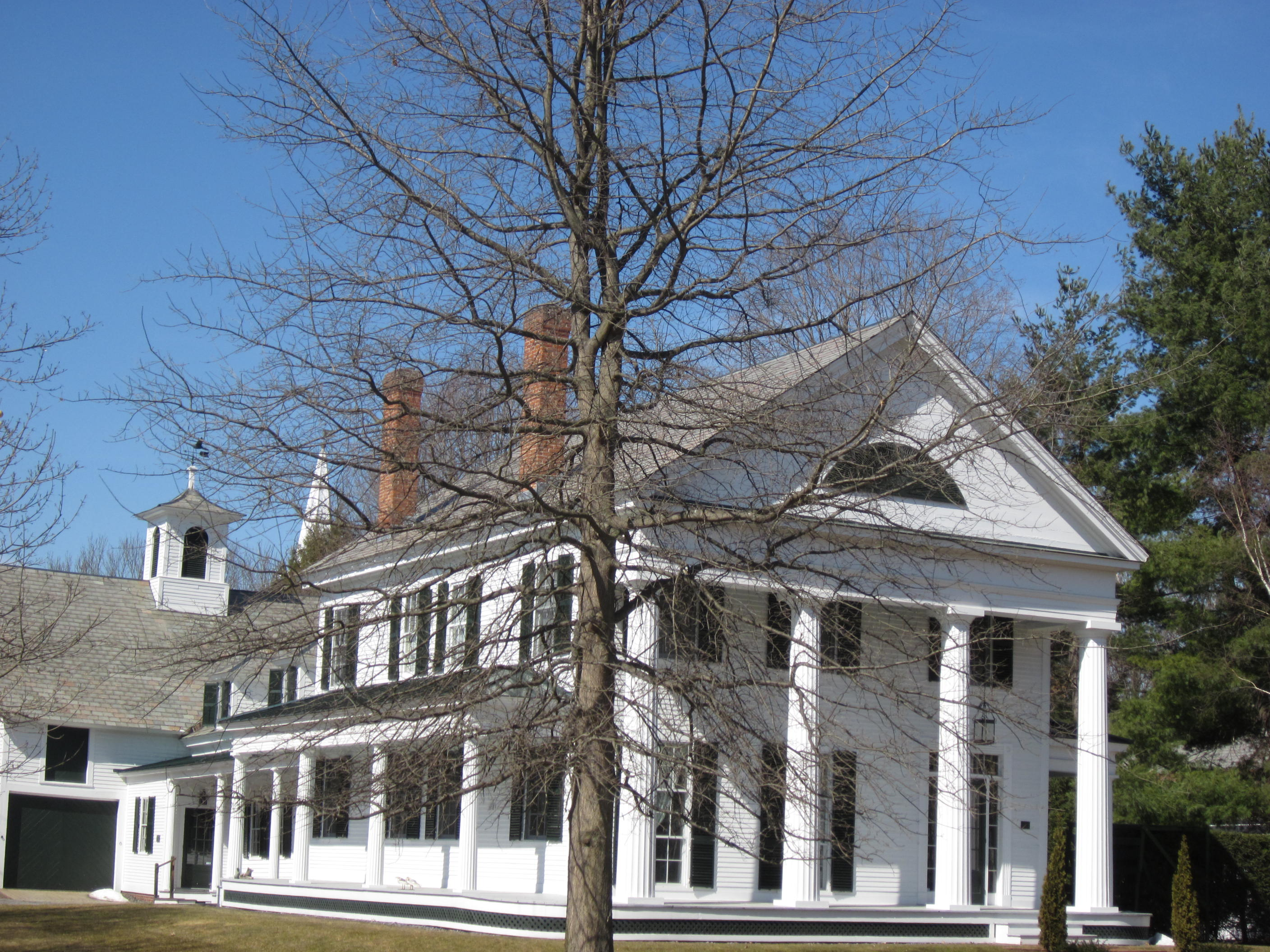

- Location within New Hampshire Location within the United States
- Location: Main St., jct. with Middle St., Walpole, New Hampshire
- Coordinates: 43°4′41″N 72°25′37″W
- Area: 0.6 acres (0.24 ha)
- Built: 1839
- Architectural style: Greek Revival
- NRHP reference No.: 00001037
- Added to NRHP: August 31, 2000

The Peck-Porter House is a historic house at the corner of Main and Middle Streets in Walpole, New Hampshire. Built in 1839, it is an unusually elaborate and sophisticated example of Greek Revival architecture, given its small-town setting. The house was listed on the National Register of Historic Places in 2000.

== Description and history ==
The Peck-Porter House stands just south of Walpole's small commercial district, on the west side of Main Street at its northwest corner with Middle Street. It is a 2 1/2-story wood-frame structure, with a gabled roof and clapboarded exterior. Its front facade is three bays wide, sheltered by a two-story portico supported by fluted Doric columns. The columns rise to an entablature and a fully pedimented gable with a rounded fan at its center. The side elevations have matching single story porches supported by fluted columns. The interior retains many original period features, including a particularly fine spiral staircase and six fireplace mantels. An ell extending to the rear of the house contains evidence of older construction, suggesting it may have been at least part of the original c. 1790s house on the property.

The main block of the house was built in 1839 for Philip Peck, owner of a local dry goods business. The house is an excellent example of high Greek Revival styling rarely found in rural parts of New Hampshire. Peck lost the house after going bankrupt in 1842; it was eventually acquired by Dr. Winslow Porter in 1875, in whose family it remained until 1963.

== See also ==
- National Register of Historic Places listings in Cheshire County, New Hampshire
