= Walpole, New Hampshire =

- Town
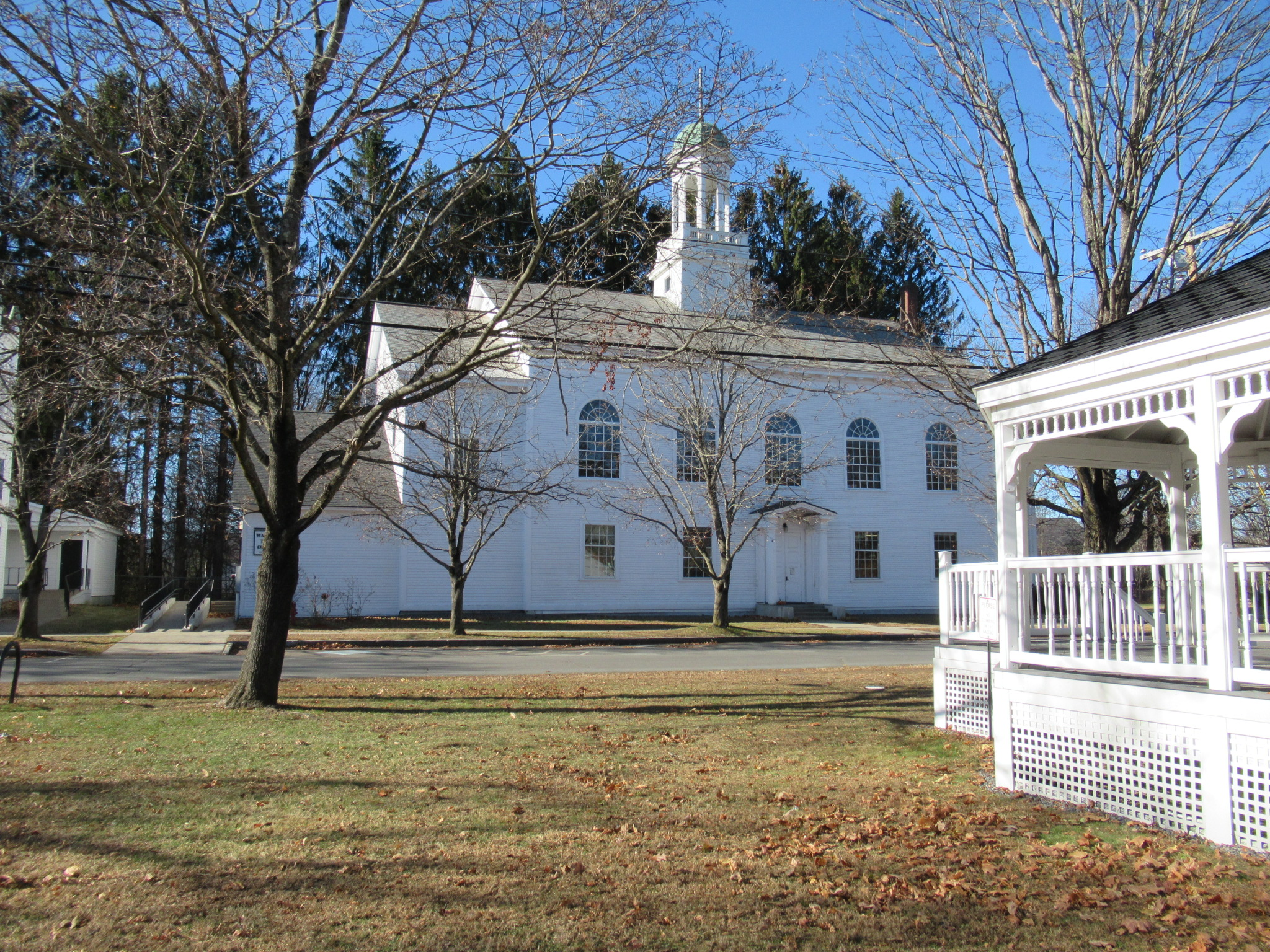
- Town Hall in 2019

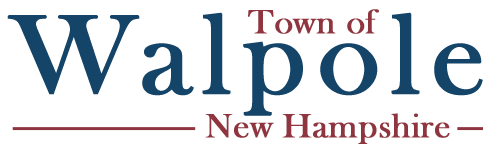
- Logo

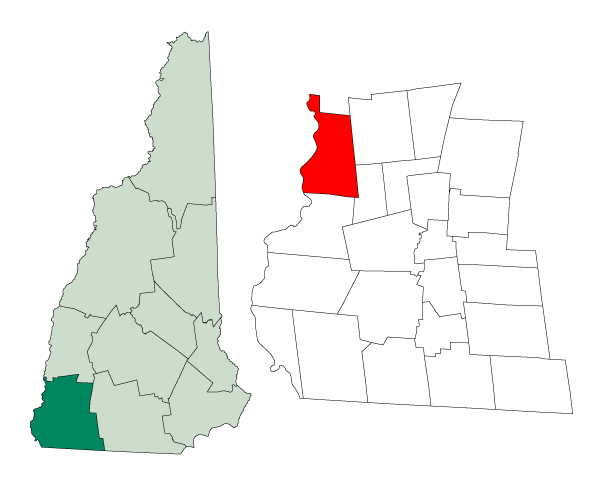
- Location in Cheshire County, New Hampshire
- Coordinates: 43°04′26″N 72°24′27″W
- Country: United States
- State: New Hampshire
- County: Cheshire
- Incorporated: 1756
- Named for: Robert Walpole
- Villages: Walpole; North Walpole; Drewsville

Area
  - Total: 36.7 sq mi (95.0 km^{2})
  - Land: 35.2 sq mi (91.2 km^{2})
  - Water: 1.4 sq mi (3.7 km^{2}) 3.94%
- Elevation: 846 ft (258 m)

Population (2020)
  - Total: 3,633
  - Density: 103/sq mi (39.8/km^{2})
- Time zone: UTC-5 (Eastern)
  - Summer (DST): UTC-4 (Eastern)
- ZIP codes: 03608 (Walpole); 03604 (Drewsville); 03609 (North Walpole)
- Area code: 603
- FIPS code: 33-78420
- GNIS feature ID: 873744
- Website: www.walpolenh.us

Walpole is a town in Cheshire County, New Hampshire, United States. The population was 3,633 at the 2020 census, and an estimated 3,706 in 2025.

The town's central village, where 573 people resided at the 2020 census, is defined as the Walpole census-designated place (CDP) and is east of New Hampshire Route 12. The town also includes the villages of North Walpole and Drewsville.

== History ==
The town was first granted in 1736 by colonial Governor Jonathan Belcher of Massachusetts as "Number 3", third in a line of Connecticut River fort towns. It was settled as early as 1736, and called "Great Falls" or "Lunenburg". Colonel Benjamin Bellows, for whom Bellows Falls, Vermont, is named, built a large fort here for defense against Native attack. After the border between Massachusetts and New Hampshire was fixed (with Number 3 on the New Hampshire side of the line), the town was regranted by Governor Benning Wentworth as "Bellowstown", after its founder. It was incorporated in 1756. The grant was renewed in 1761, when the town was renamed Walpole, in honor of Sir Robert Walpole, 1st Earl of Orford and first Prime Minister of Great Britain.

The first bridge across the Connecticut River, an engineering feat in its day, was built at Walpole in 1785, and is regarded as one of the most famous early spans in the United States. The town contains many architecturally significant old houses, including several associated with Colonel Bellows and members of his family. Walpole Academy, built in 1831 and attributed to master-builder Aaron Prentiss Howland, is listed on the National Register of Historic Places. The abundant lilacs in the town inspired Louisa May Alcott to write the 1878 book Under the Lilacs.

The Alcott family moved to Walpole temporarily beginning in the summer of 1855 after Benjamin Willis, brother-in-law of matriarch Abby May Alcott, offered the family rent-free use of his home. Louisa was the first to move there and called the town "a lovely place, high among the hills". Her father Amos Bronson Alcott was initially happy with his hardworking neighbors there and wrote, "'Tis refreshing to yoke one's idealism with this team of tug-along-the-rut of realism, and so get practical wisdom out of it, and sanity." Louisa eventually moved to Boston for the summer, and her sister Anna took a teaching job in Syracuse, New York. With his family split, Bronson came to dislike his experience in Walpole and found it difficult, as he wrote, "to make the most of myself and them in this little river town and its quiet population." Abby had been working with one of the town's poorest families, and from them the Alcotts contracted smallpox. In the fall of 1857, the family moved to Concord, Massachusetts, to live in the home they named Orchard House.

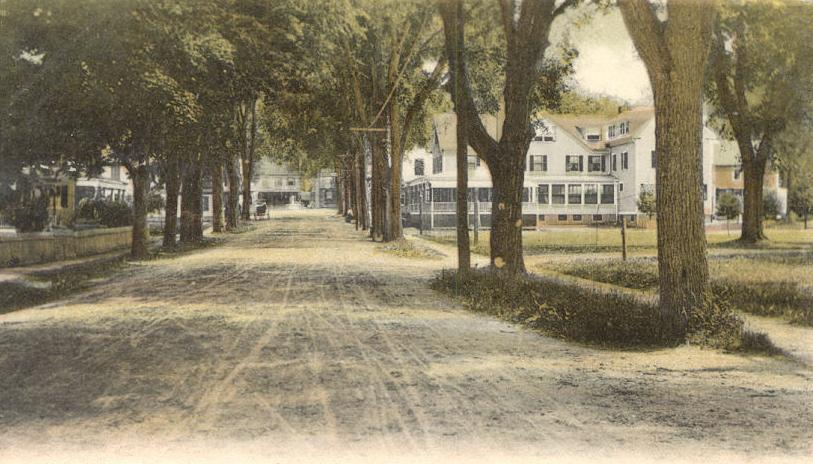
Westminster St. in 1906

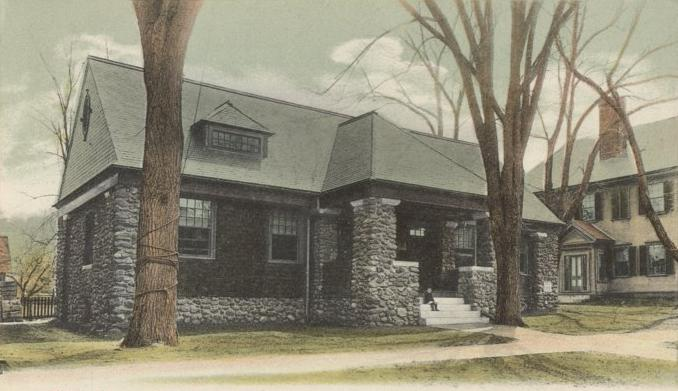
Town library in 1906

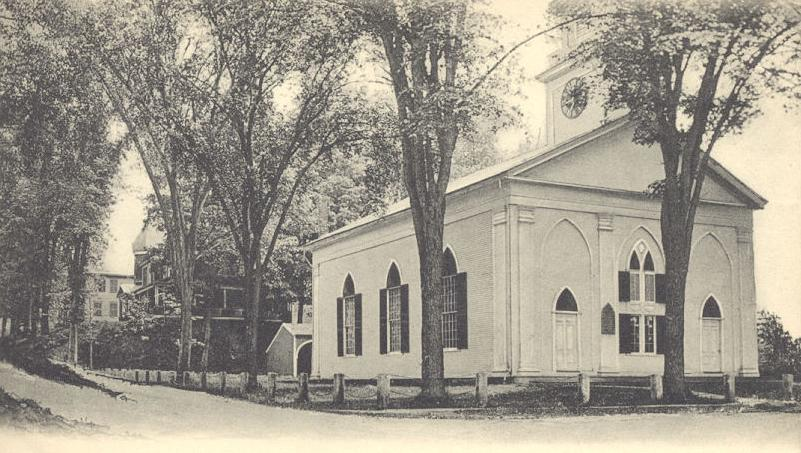
Old church c. 1905

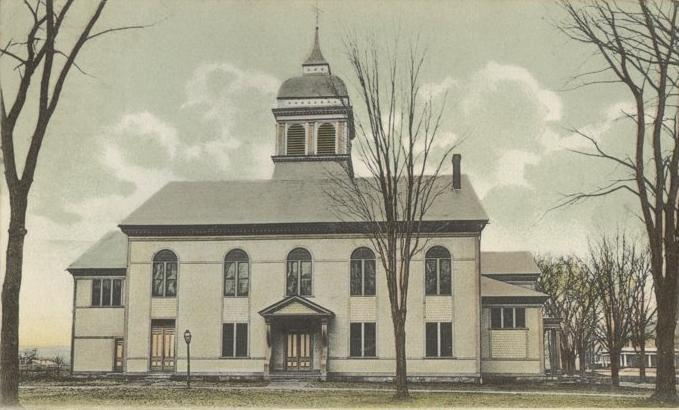
Town Hall in 1906

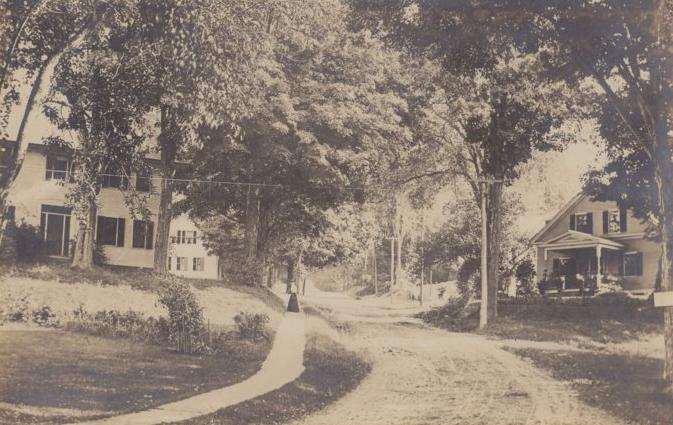
Street scene c. 1915

== Geography ==
According to the United States Census Bureau, the town has a total area of 36.7 square miles (95.0 km^{2}), of which 35.2 square miles (91.2 km^{2}) are land and 1.4 square miles (3.7 km^{2}) are water, comprising 3.94% of the town. The town is drained by the Connecticut River, which forms the western border of the town and is also the state border with Vermont. The northern part of Walpole is drained by the Cold River, a tributary of the Connecticut. The highest point in town is the summit of Derry Hill, at 1,663 feet (507 m) above sea level.

Walpole is served by state routes 12 and 123.

=== Adjacent municipalities ===
- Charlestown (north)
- Langdon (north)
- Alstead (east)
- Surry (southeast)
- Westmoreland (south)
- Westminster, Vermont (west)
- Rockingham, Vermont (northwest)

== Demographics ==
Historical population
Census	Pop.	Note	%±
1790	1,245		—
1800	1,743		40.0%
1810	1,894		8.7%
1820	2,020		6.7%
1830	1,974		−2.3%
1840	2,015		2.1%
1850	2,034		0.9%
1860	1,868		−8.2%
1870	1,830		−2.0%
1880	2,018		10.3%
1890	2,163		7.2%
1900	2,693		24.5%
1910	2,668		−0.9%
1920	2,553		−4.3%
1930	2,287		−10.4%
1940	2,400		4.9%
1950	2,536		5.7%
1960	2,825		11.4%
1970	2,966		5.0%
1980	3,188		7.5%
1990	3,210		0.7%
2000	3,594		12.0%
2010	3,734		3.9%
2020	3,633		−2.7%
2024 (est.)	3,717		2.3%
U.S. Decennial Census

As of the census of 2010, there were 3,734 people, 1,576 households, and 1,036 families residing in the town. There were 1,715 housing units, of which 139, or 8.1%, were vacant. The racial makeup of the town was 97.3% white, 0.3% African American, 0.2% Native American, 0.5% Asian, 0.0% Native Hawaiian or Pacific Islander, 0.2% some other race, and 1.5% from two or more races. 1.3% of the population were Hispanic or Latino of any race.

Of the 1,576 households, 29.3% had children under the age of 18 living with them, 52.8% were headed by married couples living together, 8.9% had a female householder with no husband present, and 34.3% were non-families. 26.2% of all households were made up of individuals, and 12.2% were someone living alone who was 65 years of age or older. The average household size was 2.37, and the average family size was 2.86.

In the town, 21.8% of the population were under the age of 18, 6.2% were from 18 to 24, 22.9% from 25 to 44, 31.7% from 45 to 64, and 17.3% were 65 years of age or older. The median age was 44.5 years. For every 100 females, there were 95.2 males. For every 100 females age 18 and over, there were 92.0 males.

For the period 2011–2015, the estimated median annual income for a household was $66,613, and the median income for a family was $77,802. Male full-time workers had a median income of $49,141 versus $33,566 for females. The per capita income for the town was $35,071. 5.8% of the population and 4.8% of families were below the poverty line. 8.0% of the population under the age of 18 and 3.4% of those 65 or older were living in poverty.

== Sites of interest ==
- Stephen Rowe Bradley House
- Drewsville Mansion
- Peck-Porter House
- Vilas Bridge
- Walpole Academy

== Notable people ==
- Abby May Alcott (1800–1877), social worker, activist
- Amos Bronson Alcott (1799–1888), writer, educator, philosopher
- Louisa May Alcott (1832–1888), writer
- Glover Morrill Allen (1879–1942), zoologist
- Ken Burns (born 1953), documentary filmmaker
- Davis Carpenter (1799–1878), US congressman
- Herman M. Chapin (1823–1879), mayor of Cleveland
- Dayton Duncan (born 1949), writer and documentary producer
- Franklin Hooper (1851–1914), professor, founder of the Brooklyn Museum
- Rev. Jonathan Leavitt (1731–1802), first minister, later dismissed by the town
- Charles Holland Mason (1822–1894), politician, lawyer
- Fanny Peabody Mason (1864–1948), heiress, philanthropist
- Eliza Ann Otis (1833–1904), poet, journalist, philanthropist
- Howard Petrie (1906–1968), actor
- Gary Smith, (1958 – 2023) record producer
- Tom Veitch (1941–2022), writer
- Roger Vose (1763–1841), US congressman
- Horace Wells (1815–1848), pioneered anesthesia in dentistry
