= Drewsville, New Hampshire =

Unincorporated community in New Hampshire, United States

- Unincorporated community
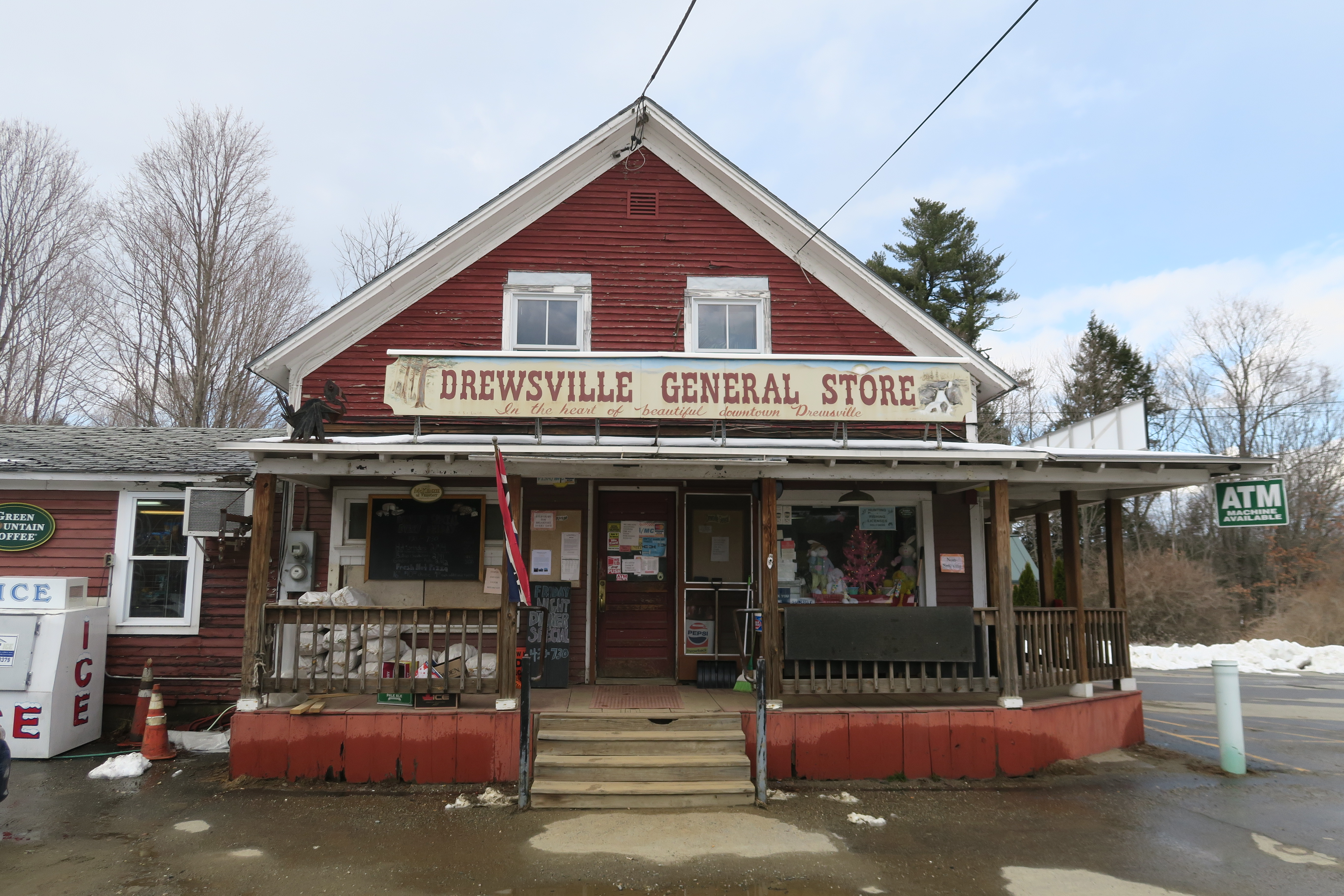
- Drewsville General Store

- Location within New Hampshire Location within the United States
- Coordinates: 43°07′40″N 72°23′32″W
- Country: United States
- State: New Hampshire
- County: Cheshire
- Town: Walpole
- Elevation: 479 ft (146 m)
- Time zone: UTC-5 (Eastern (EST))
  - Summer (DST): UTC-4 (EDT)
- ZIP code: 03604
- Area code: 603
- GNIS feature ID: 866636

Drewsville is an unincorporated community in the town of Walpole in Cheshire County, New Hampshire, United States.

The village is located in the northeastern corner of Walpole, just south of the valley of the Cold River. New Hampshire Route 123 passes through the village, connecting it with Alstead to the east and the rest of Walpole (including North Walpole) and Bellows Falls, Vermont to the west.

Drewsville has a separate ZIP code (03604) from other areas in the town of Walpole.
