= Unity Town Hall =

- U.S. National Register of Historic Places
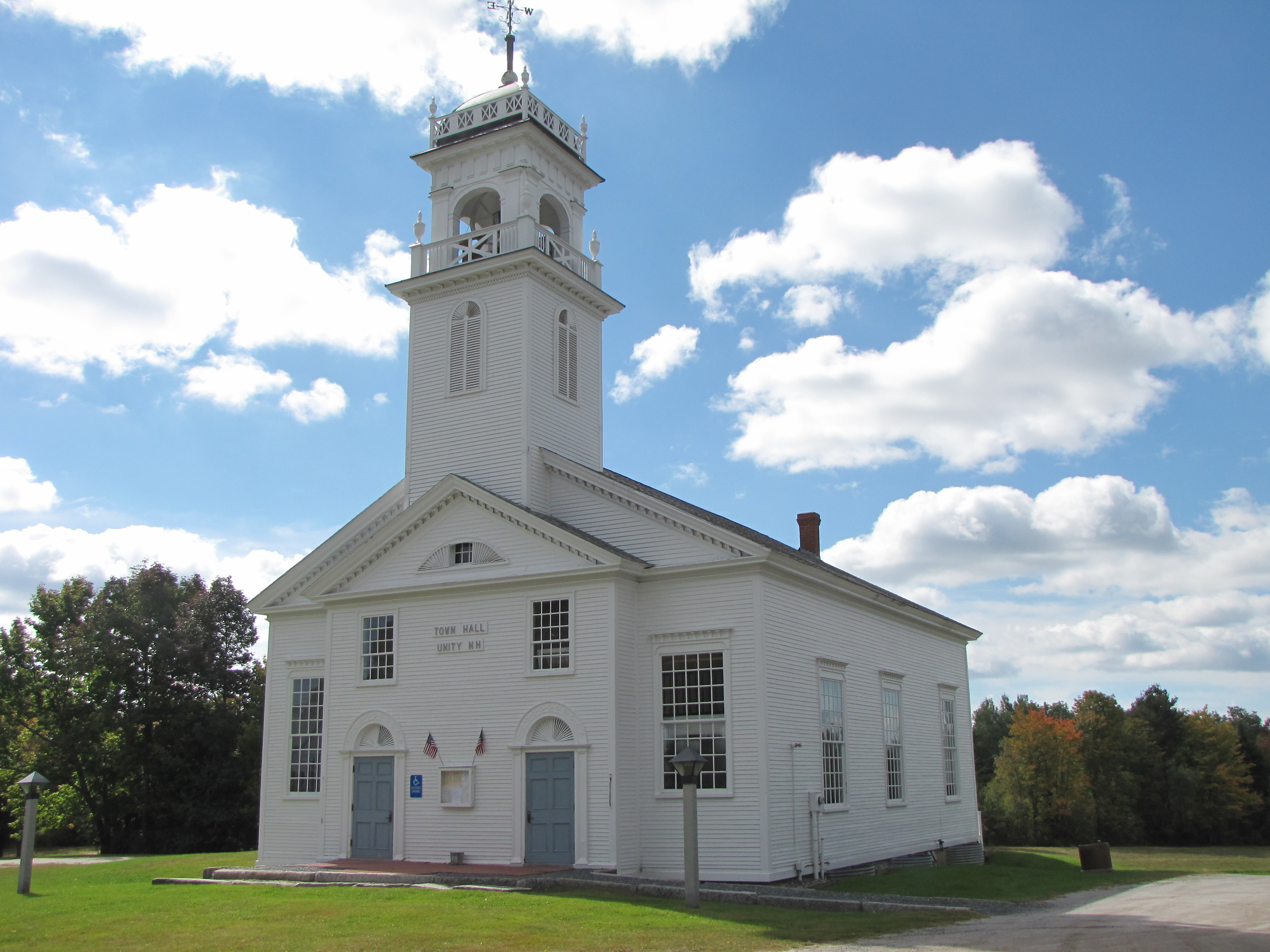

- Location within New Hampshire Location within the United States
- Location: Off Unity Rd. & Old NH Tnpk., Unity, New Hampshire
- Coordinates: 43°17′38″N 72°15′37″W
- Area: 0.7 acres (0.28 ha)
- Built: 1831
- Architectural style: Greek Revival, Federal
- NRHP reference No.: 85001199
- Added to NRHP: June 6, 1985

Unity Town Hall is the town hall of Unity, New Hampshire. It is located in the center of Unity, on the 2nd New Hampshire Turnpike just north of its junction with Center Road. Built in 1831 as a Baptist church, it is a well-preserved example of transitional Federal-Greek Revival styling. The building was listed on the National Register of Historic Places in 1985.

== Description and history ==
Unity's town hall is located in its rural village center, on the west side of the 2nd New Hampshire Turnpike just north of Center Road. It is a single-story wood-frame structure, with a gabled roof and clapboarded exterior. It has modest Greek Revival styling, with plain cornerboards and a cornice with decorative molding. An entry pavilion projects from the main block, echoing its decorative features, and there is a two-stage tower with an open belfry. The two entrances are topped by Federal-style fanlights, and there is a half-eye window in the pavilion's gable. The tower's first stage has louvered openings with half-round fanlight tops, and is itself crowned by a low balustrade with urned posts. The belfry, with arched openings, is crowned by a similar but smaller balustrade, which surround a cupola and weathervane.

The structure was built in 1831 as a church for the local Baptist congregation which was organized in 1794. Although its builder is unknown, the building's design is strongly influenced by the work of Elias Carter, a builder responsible for a number of period churches further south. The Baptists sold the church to the town in 1877.

== See also ==
- National Register of Historic Places listings in Sullivan County, New Hampshire
