= George Brintnall Dutton =

American businessman and politician

George Brintnall Dutton (October 7, 1818 – April 5, 1898) was an American businessman and politician.

Dutton was born in Charlestown, New Hampshire and was a contractor. He lived with his wife and family in St. Anthony, Minnesota Territory. Dutton served in the Minnesota Territorial House of Representatives in 1853, He died in Waco, Texas.
