= North Walpole, New Hampshire =

Census-designated place in New Hampshire, United States

- Census-designated place
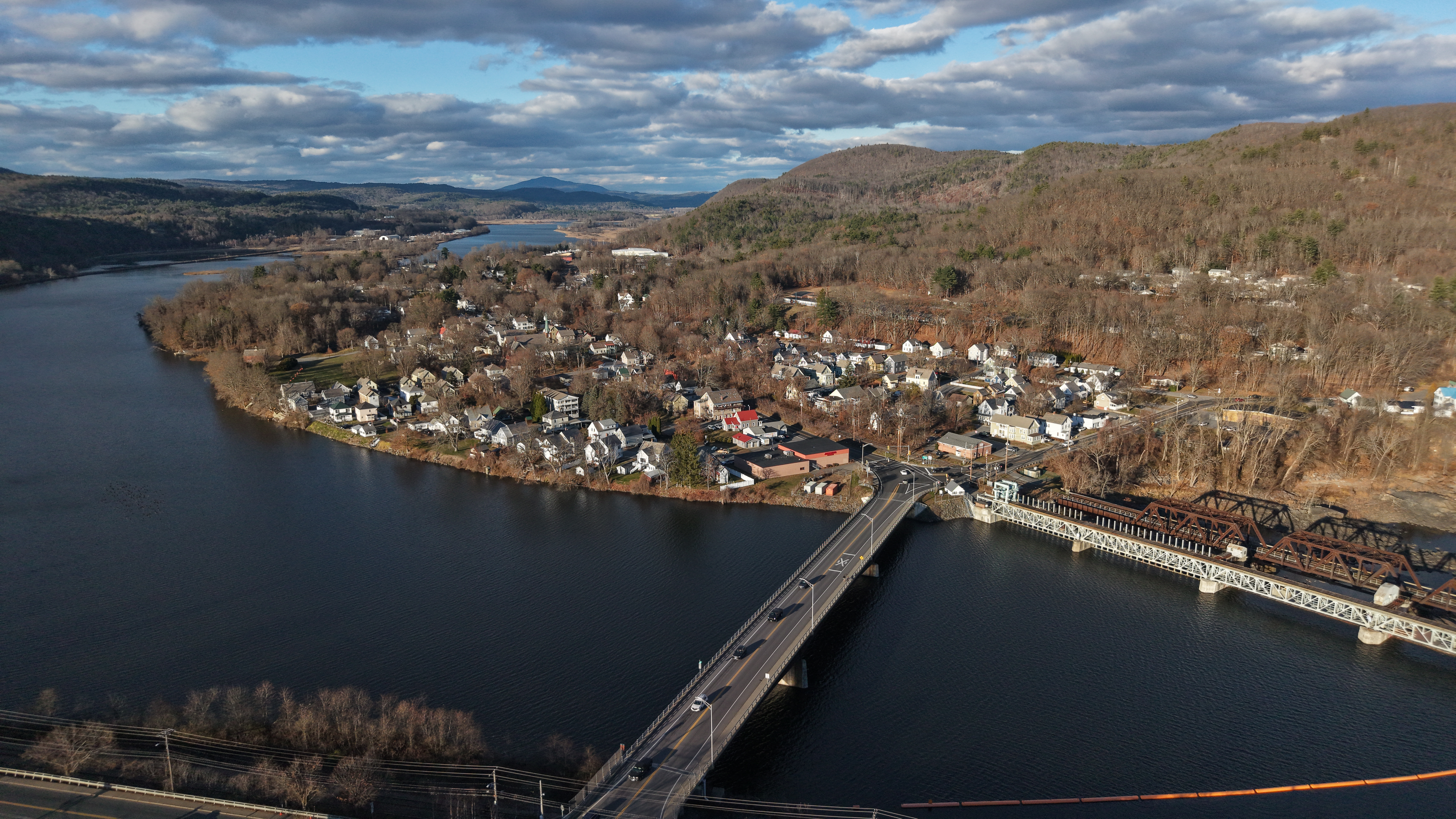
- North Walpole, NH, from the south

- Location within New Hampshire Location within the United States
- Coordinates: 43°8′20″N 72°26′53″W
- Country: United States
- State: New Hampshire
- County: Cheshire
- Town: Walpole

Area
  - Total: 0.70 sq mi (1.81 km^{2})
  - Land: 0.69 sq mi (1.80 km^{2})
  - Water: 0.0039 sq mi (0.01 km^{2})
- Elevation: 377 ft (115 m)

Population (2020)
  - Total: 785
  - Density: 1,130.9/sq mi (436.64/km^{2})
- Time zone: UTC-5 (Eastern (EST))
  - Summer (DST): UTC-4 (EDT)
- ZIP code: 03609
- Area code: 603
- FIPS code: 33-56420
- GNIS feature ID: 2629735

North Walpole is a census-designated place (CDP) in the town of Walpole, New Hampshire, United States. It had a population of 785 at the 2020 census, making it the largest village in the town of Walpole.

It is located along New Hampshire Route 12 directly across the Connecticut River from the village of Bellows Falls, Vermont. North Walpole has a separate ZIP code (03609) from the rest of Walpole (03608).

== History ==
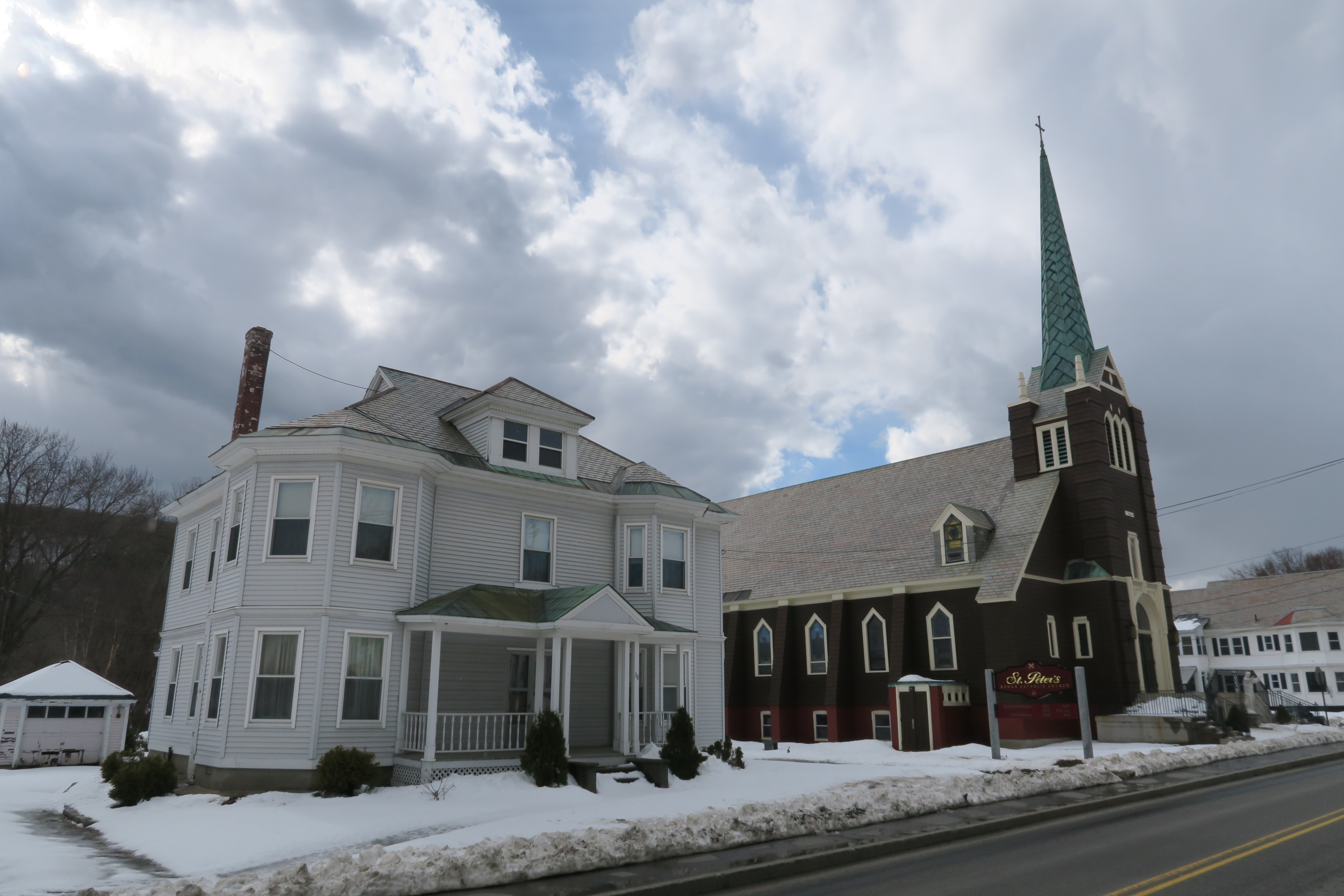
St. Peter's Roman Catholic Church

Spring snowmelt brought log drives down the Connecticut River. Log drivers were stationed to guide logs through a sluice over the dam at Bellows Falls. North Walpole offered twelve to eighteen saloons to quench log drivers' thirst. These spring drives were stopped after 1915, when pleasure boat owners complained about the hazards to navigation.

== Geography ==
North Walpole is in the northwestern corner of the town of Walpole, bordered to the south and west by the Connecticut River and to the north by the town of Charlestown in Sullivan County. New Hampshire Route 12 passes through the center of the village as Main Street and Church Street; it leads north 7 miles (11 km) to Charlestown and 20 miles (32 km) to Claremont, while to the south it leads 4.5 miles (7.2 km) to Walpole village and 21 miles (34 km) to Keene. The Arch Bridge leads from North Walpole across the Connecticut River to the village of Bellows Falls in Vermont.

According to the U.S. Census Bureau, the North Walpole CDP has a total area of 0.7 square miles (1.8 km^{2}), of which 2.24 acres (9,081 m^{2}), or 0.51%, are water.

== Demographics ==
Historical population
Census	Pop.	Note	%±
2010	828		—
2020	785		−5.2%
U.S. Decennial Census

As of the census of 2010, there were 828 people, 340 households, and 216 families residing in the CDP. There were 387 housing units, of which 47, or 12.1%, were vacant. The racial makeup of the CDP was 96.3% white, 0.4% African American, 0.2% Native American, 0.2% Asian, 0.0% Native Hawaiian or Pacific Islander, 0.4% some other race, and 2.5% two or more races. 1.4% of the population were Hispanic or Latino of any race.

Of the 340 households in the CDP, 35.0% had children under the age of 18 living with them, 43.2% were headed by married couples living together, 14.1% had a female householder with no husband present, and 36.5% were non-families. 30.0% of all households were made up of individuals, and 10.5% were someone living alone who was 65 years of age or older. The average household size was 2.44, and the average family size was 3.02.

26.3% of residents in the CDP were under the age of 18, 7.0% were from age 18 to 24, 29.9% were from 25 to 44, 24.0% were from 45 to 64, and 12.7% were 65 years of age or older. The median age was 37.4 years. For every 100 females, there were 92.6 males. For every 100 females age 18 and over, there were 90.6 males.

For the period 2011–15, the estimated median annual income for a household was $71,739, and the median income for a family was $70,583. The per capita income for the CDP was $26,565. 8.9% of the population and 4.7% of families were below the poverty line, along with 9.1% of people under the age of 18 and 6.3% of people 65 or older.

== Notable person ==
- Bill Jackowski (1914–1996), National League umpire from 1952 to 1968
