= Arch Bridge (Bellows Falls) =

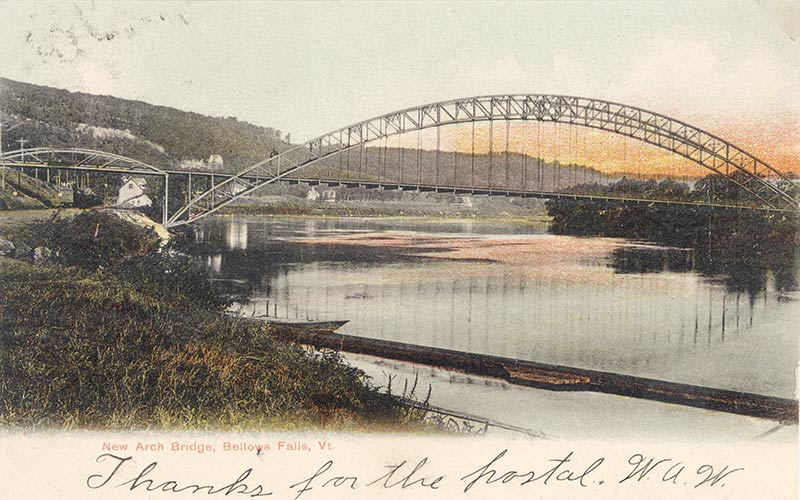
- 1905 arch bridge in Bellows Falls, Vermont over the Connecticut River
- Coordinates: 43.1380°N 72.4484°W
- Carries: Vehicles, pedestrians
- Crosses: Connecticut River
- Locale: Bellows Falls, Vermont to North Walpole, New Hampshire

Characteristics
- Design: three-hinged through arch bridge plus a bowstring arch truss (1st); 4-span girder bridge (2nd)
- Material: Steel (both)
- Total length: 644 feet 8 inches (196.49 m); 540 feet (160 m) (main span over river); 104 feet 8 inches (31.90 m) (over rail track) (1st)
- Width: 32 feet (9.8 m) (1st)
- Height: 70 feet (21 m) above the roadway (1st)
- Longest span: 540 feet (160 m) (1st)
- No. of spans: 2 (1st); 4 (2nd)
- Piers in water: 0 (1st); 3 (2nd)

History
- Designer: Joseph R. Worcester
- Constructed by: Lewis F. Shoemaker & Co. (1st)
- Construction start: 1904 (1st)
- Construction end: 1905 (1st); 1984 (2nd)
- Closed: 1971 (1st)

Location
- Interactive map of Arch Bridge

The Bellows Falls Arch Bridge was a three-hinged steel through arch bridge over the Connecticut River between Bellows Falls, Vermont and North Walpole, New Hampshire. It was structurally significant as the longest arch bridge in the United States when it was completed in 1905.

The bridge was built to circumvent an existing toll bridge and prevent people from using the Boston and Maine Railroad bridge, a practice the railroad preferred to discourage.

== History ==
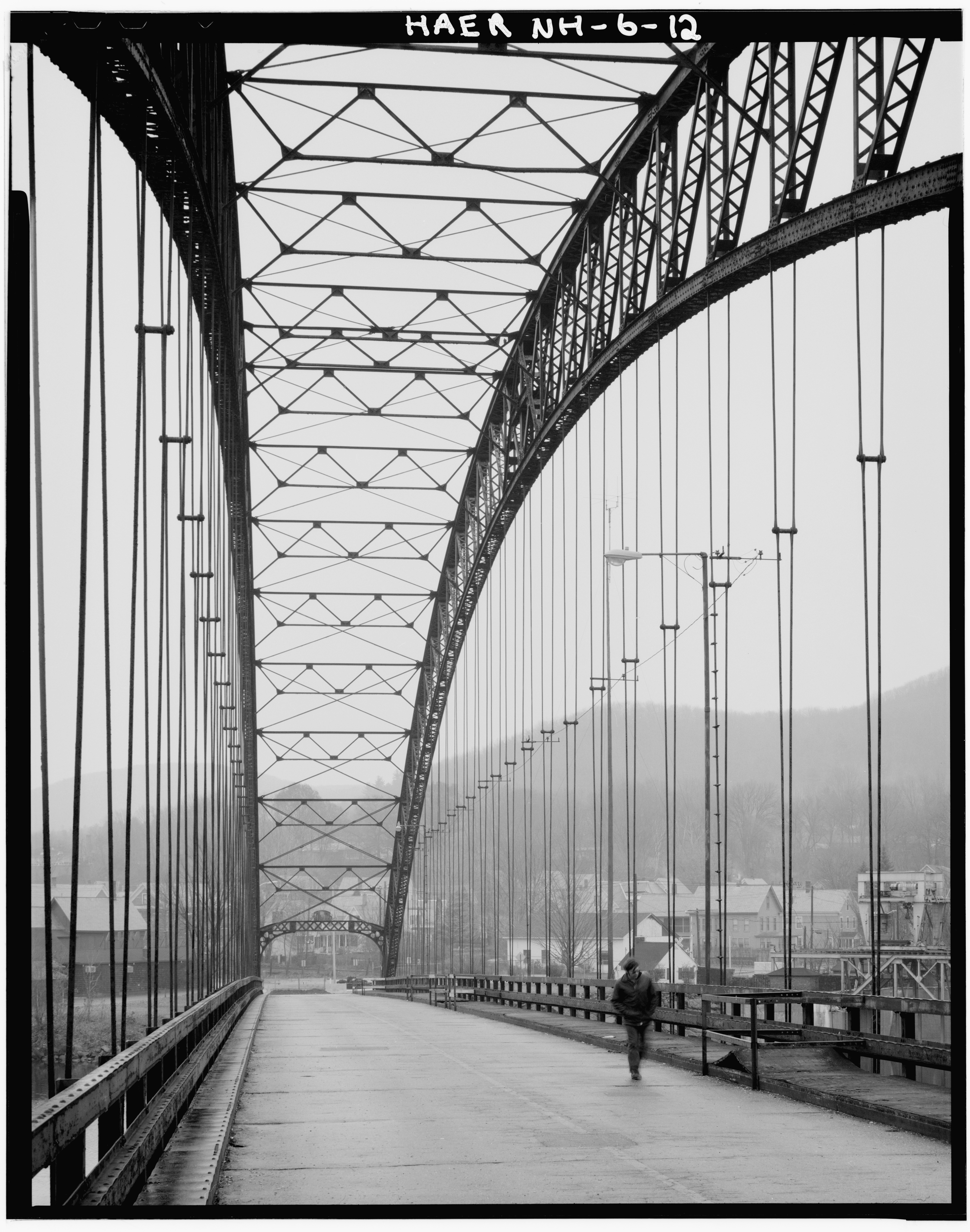
Historic American Engineering Record photograph of the bridge in fall 1979

Due to industrial and transportation expansion, residential needs in the Bellows Falls and Walpole area expanded in the late 1800s. The only means of crossing the river was provided by the Tucker Toll Bridge and the Sullivan Railroad Bridge.

The Tucker Toll Bridge was a Town lattice truss covered bridge completed in 1840, which was acquired by the towns in 1904 and free thereafter. The Sullivan Railroad Bridge was originally built by the Sullivan Railroad, (Note: The Sullivan Railroad was acquired by the Boston and Maine Railroad, see List of defunct New Hampshire railroads) built in 1882 as a replacement for an 1852 span.

Residents didn't like the toll, and the Boston and Maine Railroad objected to pedestrians on its bridge, so following the town meetings in March 1904, the two communities formed a joint committee to buy out the toll bridge and replace it with a new bridge, with five members from each town. Walpole budgeted US$30,000 (US$1,070,000 with inflation), and Rockingham, Vermont, which includes Bellows Falls, offered US$15,000 (US$540,000 with inflation). The two towns established an agreement whereby maintenance costs would be shouldered two-thirds by Walpole and one-third by Rockingham.

Design restrictions included the objection by the Bellows Falls Canal Company to any abutments obstructing the river near their canal, as well as the river bed conditions in the area, which are roughly 25 feet (7.6 m) deep, with no firm location for a pier. This situation was thought to necessitate a single span structure.

The Bridge Committee held an unsuccessful design competition. While the Committee received many proposals for deck trusses and suspension bridges, all were too expensive. Having exhausted their own proposals, they requested assistance from the railroad. Since it wished to eliminate pedestrians from its bridge, the railroad complied by providing a company engineer as an advisor. The advisor, a Mr. Snow, recommended that the Committee hire civil engineer J.R. Worcester, from Boston, Massachusetts, which they did.

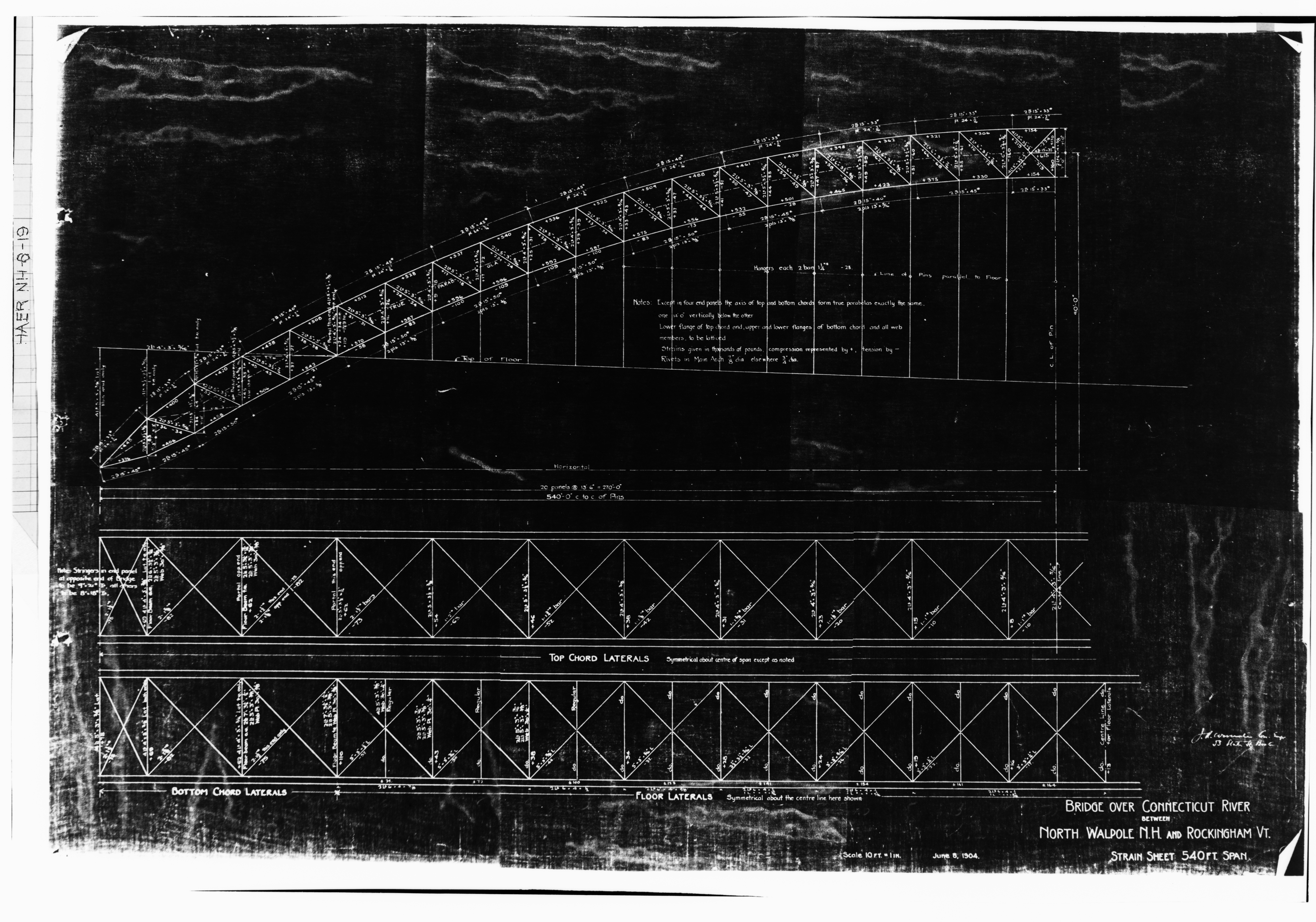
Schematic of Bellows Falls Arch Bridge from the Historic American Engineering Record

=== Design ===
The final design was defined by Worcester as a 540-foot (160 m)-long three-hinged arch with a suspended roadway, plus a 104-foot-8-inch (31.90 m) bowstring truss over the railroad on the Vermont side. The large arch type of structure was new in the US, but not in Europe, which may have inspired Worcester's concept. The two arch trusses were each designed to support a load of 60 lbs per square foot (0.42 pounds per square inch (2.9 kPa)). The total weight of the steel in the bridge was 450 short tons (410 t). As a departure from a normal three-hinged arch, the design used a compression joint in each arch instead of the third hinge. He apparently did this to provide a continuous visual curve through the arches.

The roadway, made of Georgia yellow pine, was 32 feet (9.8 m) wide, with a total length just shy of 650 feet (200 m), a 3.3% grade up to the Vermont side, and a load capacity of 100 lbs. per square foot (0.69 pounds per square inch (4.8 kPa)).

=== Initial construction ===
Using falsework made of spruce, later recycled by the local paper mills, construction started in November 1904. Assembly of the main superstructure began in December 1904, from prefabricated sections by Louis A. Shoemaker and Company (Philadelphia).

Construction crews assembled the arches from both sides of the river. A rivalry formed between the two crews, likely making the assembly go faster, as the trusses were connected on January 10, 1905, after twenty-eight working days. The total construction time was four months, using a total of forty-five men. The bridge was formally opened on March 20, 1905.

== Subsequent changes ==
The river flooded in 1927. The resulting damage to the bridge was not major, so the bridge was soon back in operation.

The same can not be said of the Flood of 1936. The failure of a major ice jam sent large ice blocks downriver, striking both ends of the upstream side of the bridge. This left the structure leaning upstream. Only the horizontal bracing prevented collapse. The decision was made to fix, rather than demolish, the bridge. This required efforts similar to the initial construction. The results were that the truss span was shortened by 54 feet (16 m) during the procedure in November and December 1936. This was performed by the American Bridge Company (Philadelphia), at a cost of US$120,000 (US$2,784,173 in present terms), substantially less than would have been required to replace the bridge.

In 1961, the bowstring truss span was replaced with an I-beam girder bridge. In 1971, the State of New Hampshire closed the whole bridge to vehicular traffic due to concerns about its condition.

In 1982, the bridge was demolished. However, the demolition crew required five tries before the bridge collapsed, as it apparently wasn't as weak as they had been led to believe.

The reason the bridge did not fall was the shape charges lifted the bridge slightly when they went off and the bridge settled back down in the same exact spot. Once the initial charges had been used, it was unsafe to add further charges to the primary structure. The bridge was ultimately felled by use of a cutting torch on the New Hampshire side.

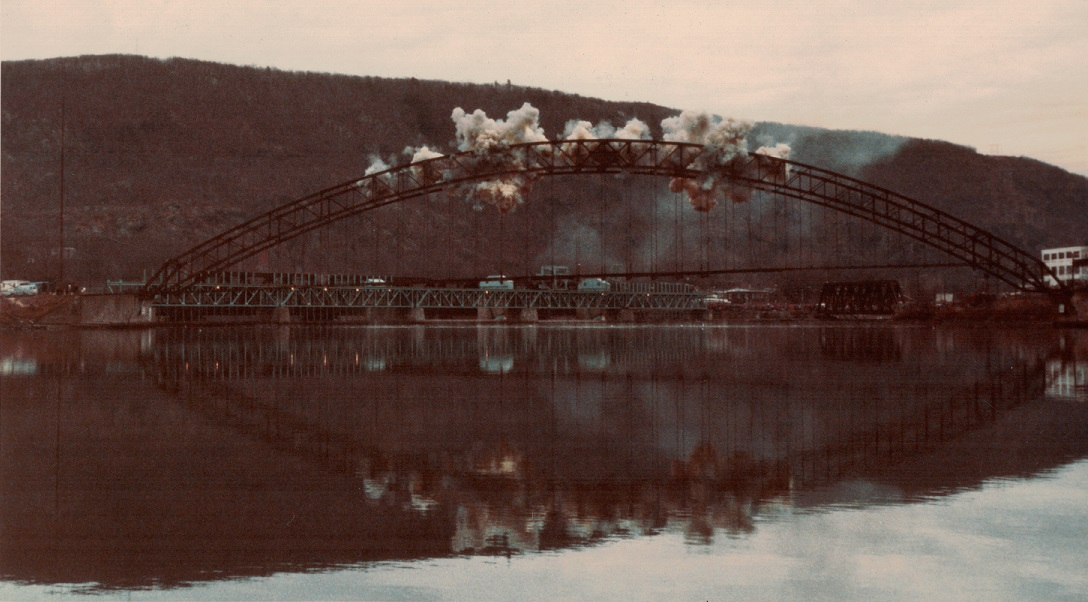
Reed and Reed initially used shape charges to demolish the arch bridge between Bellows Falls Vermont and Walpole New Hampshire

== Current bridge ==
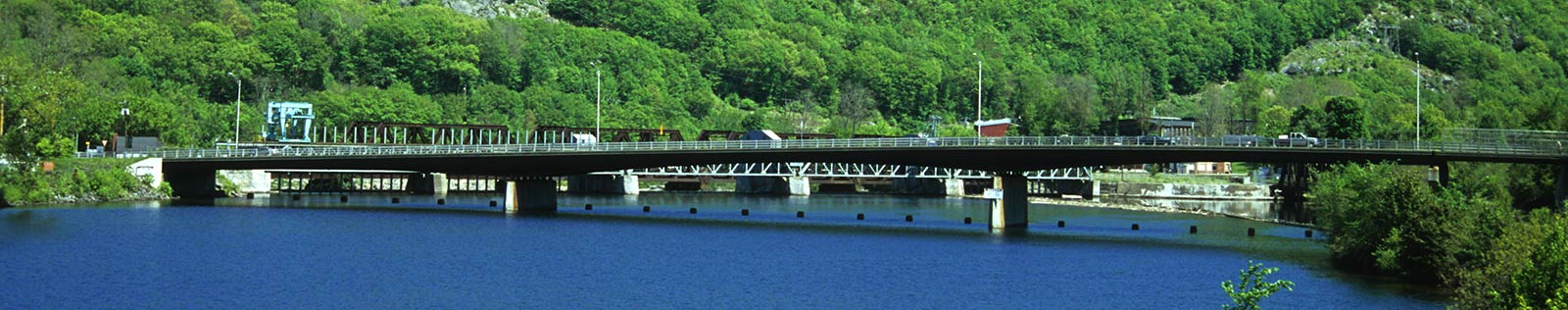

The current Arch Bridge, also known as the New Arch Bridge and the Church Street Bridge, is a 4-span girder bridge of no particular architectural significance. With the closure on March 19, 2009, of the Vilas Bridge roughly 0.5 miles (0.80 km) downstream, traffic on this bridge has increased dramatically. Due to the at-grade rail crossing on the New Hampshire side of the bridge, traffic can sometimes take as much as 20 minutes to get across. Also, there are safety concerns with the loss of redundancy between the Church Street Bridge and the Vilas Bridge.

== See also ==
- List of bridges documented by the Historic American Engineering Record in New Hampshire
- List of bridges documented by the Historic American Engineering Record in Vermont
- List of crossings of the Connecticut River

== Bibliography ==
- Hayes, Lyman Simpson (1907). History of the Town of Rockingham, Vermont, including the villages of Bellows Falls, Saxtons River, Rockingham, Cambridgeport and Bartonsville 1753–1907 with Family Genealogies. Lynn, Massachusetts: Frank S. Whitten. pp. 269–270 (plus plate).
- Jackson, Donald C. (1988). Great American Bridges and Dams. Wiley. pp. 325–326. ISBN 0-471-14385-5.
- Lowe, Jet (1979). "Credit JTL Detail view of builder's plate". Historic American Engineering Record. Washington, D.C.: Library of Congress.
- Prevoort, Roger (August 1973). Jackson, Donald C. (ed.). "Bellows Falls Arch Bridge" (PDF). Historic American Engineering Record. Washington, D.C.: Library of Congress.
- Teague, Allison (September 2009). "Safety primary concern in hastening Vilas Bridge repair". Brattleboro, Vermont: Vermont Independent Media, Inc.
- Worcester, Joseph R. (May 1910). "Bellows Falls Arch Bridge". Journal of the Association of Engineering Societies. 44–45. Boston, Massachusetts: Association of Engineering Societies: 287–291 (plus plates).
