= Charlestown (CDP), New Hampshire =

Census-designated place in New Hampshire, United States

Charlestown, New Hampshire
- Census-designated place
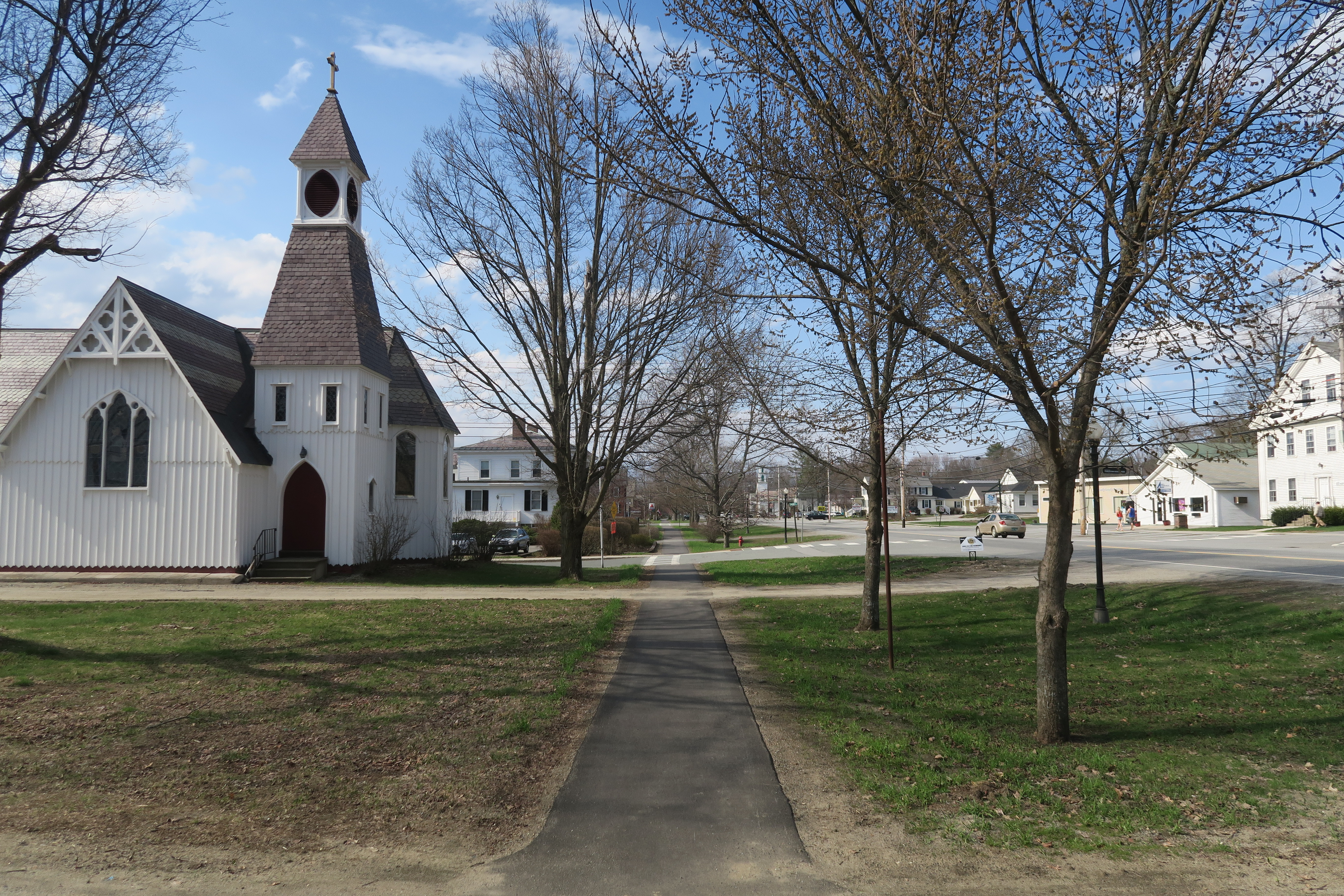
- Main Street

- Location within New Hampshire Location within the United States
- Coordinates: 43°14′08″N 72°25′25″W
- Country: United States
- State: New Hampshire
- County: Sullivan
- Town: Charlestown

Area
  - Total: 1.00 sq mi (2.59 km^{2})
  - Land: 0.95 sq mi (2.47 km^{2})
  - Water: 0.046 sq mi (0.12 km^{2})
- Elevation: 387 ft (118 m)

Population (2020)
  - Total: 1,078
  - Density: 1,131.4/sq mi (436.83/km^{2})
- Time zone: UTC-5 (Eastern (EST))
  - Summer (DST): UTC-4 (EDT)
- ZIP code: 03603
- Area code: 603
- FIPS code: 33-11300
- GNIS feature ID: 2378055

Charlestown is a census-designated place (CDP) and the main village in the town of Charlestown, New Hampshire, United States. The population of the CDP was 1,078 at the 2020 census, out of 4,806 in the entire town.

== Geography ==
The CDP is in the western part of Charlestown, on the east side of the Connecticut River, which forms the Vermont state line. From the river, the CDP border extends north up Clay Brook to Fling Road and Acworth Road. The border then turns south along a power line clearing that runs east of the village area, following it to Dickerson Brook and then southwest to Almar Street. The border then turns northwest up Meadow Road before continuing straight to Lower Landing Road, where it turns west and runs to the Connecticut River.

New Hampshire Route 12 is Charlestown's Main Street, leading north 10 miles (16 km) to Claremont and south 7 miles (11 km) to North Walpole, across the Connecticut from Bellows Falls, Vermont. New Hampshire Route 11 crosses the Connecticut 1 mile (1.6 km) north of Charlestown village, providing access to Interstate 91, which leads north 30 miles (48 km) to White River Junction, Vermont, and south 34 miles (55 km) to Brattleboro, Vermont.

According to the U.S. Census Bureau, the Charlestown CDP has a total area of 1.0 square mile (2.6 km^{2}), of which 0.97 square miles (2.5 km^{2}) are land and 0.04 square miles (0.1 km^{2}), or 4.68%, are water.

== Demographics ==
Historical population
Census	Pop.	Note	%±
1950	1,176		—
1960	1,173		−0.3%
1970	1,285		9.5%
1980	1,294		0.7%
1990	1,173		−9.4%
2000	1,145		−2.4%
2010	1,152		0.6%
2020	1,078		−6.4%
U.S. Decennial Census

As of the census of 2010, there were 1,152 people, 467 households, and 290 families residing in the CDP. There were 503 housing units, of which 36, or 7.2%, were vacant. The racial makeup of the CDP was 97.7% white, 0.1% African American, 0.2% Native American, 0.4% Asian, 0.0% Pacific Islander, 0.0% some other race, and 1.6% from two or more races. 1.0% of the population were Hispanic or Latino of any race.

Of the 467 households in the CDP, 28.1% had children under the age of 18 living with them, 43.7% were headed by married couples living together, 12.0% had a female householder with no husband present, and 37.9% were non-families. 30.6% of all households were made up of individuals, and 11.1% were someone living alone who was 65 years of age or older. The average household size was 2.30, and the average family size was 2.83.

20.1% of residents in the CDP were under the age of 18, 10.4% were from age 18 to 24, 23.2% were from 25 to 44, 28.4% were from 45 to 64, and 18.1% were 65 years of age or older. The median age was 42.7 years. For every 100 females, there were 94.3 males. For every 100 females age 18 and over, there were 91.1 males.

For the period 2011–15, the estimated median annual income for a family was $74,082. Male full-time workers had a median income of $37,689 versus $36,738 for females. The per capita income for the CDP was $20,723. 7.6% of the population and 11.0% of families were below the poverty line, along with 15.6% of people under the age of 18.
