= Charlestown, New Hampshire =

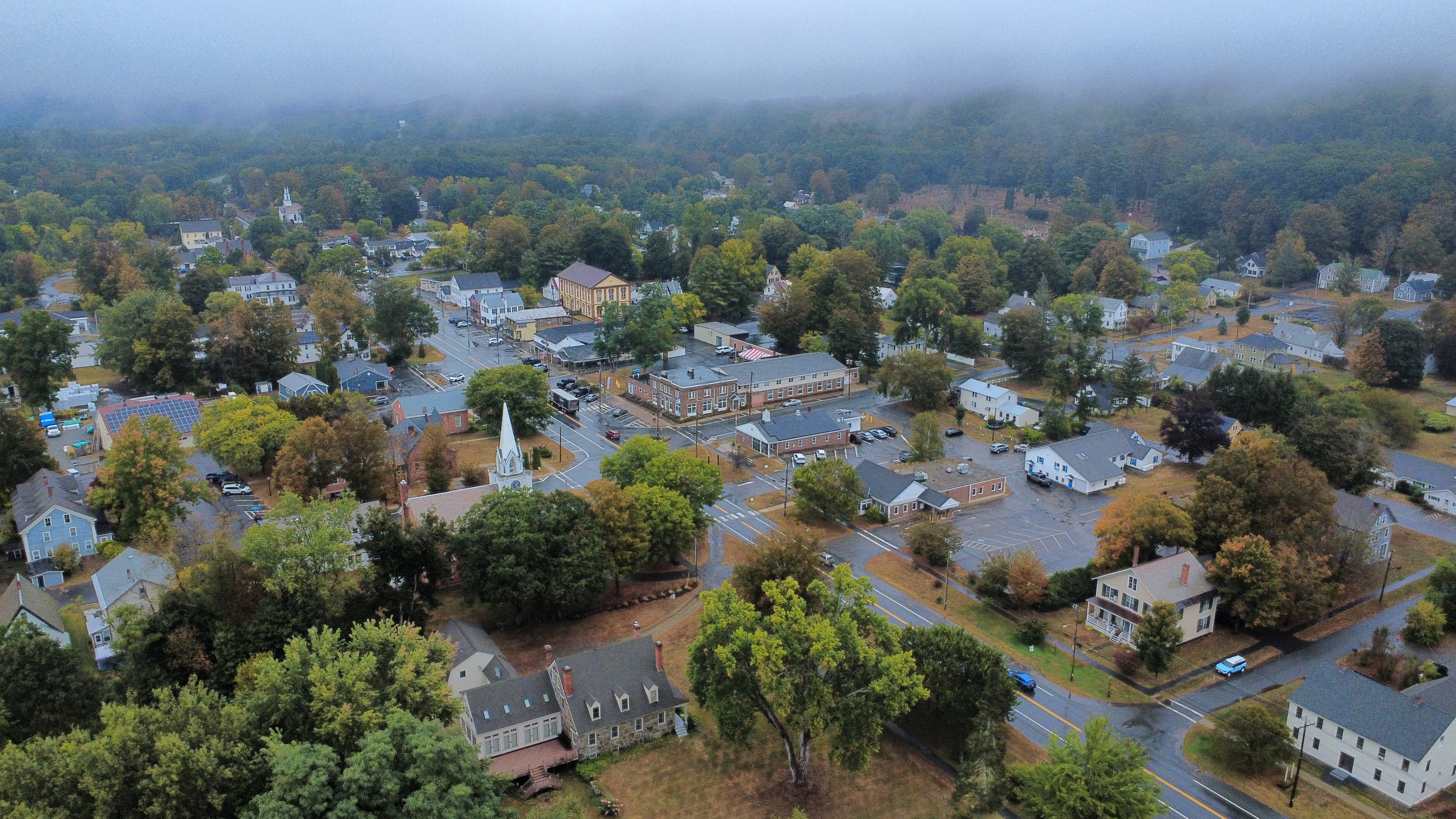
- Charlestown, NH, from the southwest

- Seal

- Location in Sullivan County and the state of New Hampshire
- Coordinates: 43°14′48″N 72°23′39″W
- Country: United States
- State: New Hampshire
- County: Sullivan
- Incorporated: 1783
- Villages: Charlestown; Hemlock Center; North Charlestown; Snumshire; South Charlestown; South Hemlock

Area
  - Total: 38.0 sq mi (98.5 km^{2})
  - Land: 35.8 sq mi (92.6 km^{2})
  - Water: 2.3 sq mi (5.9 km^{2}) 5.98%
- Elevation: 686 ft (209 m)

Population (2020)
  - Total: 4,806
  - Density: 134/sq mi (51.9/km^{2})
- Time zone: UTC-5 (Eastern)
  - Summer (DST): UTC-4 (Eastern)
- ZIP code: 03603
- Area code: 603
- FIPS code: 33-11380
- GNIS feature ID: 873562
- Website: www.charlestown-nh.gov

Charlestown is a town in Sullivan County, New Hampshire, United States. The population was 4,806 at the 2020 census, down from 5,114 at the 2010 census. The town is home to Hubbard State Forest and the headquarters of the Student Conservation Association.

The primary village in town, where 1,078 people resided at the 2020 census, is defined as the Charlestown census-designated place (CDP) and is located along New Hampshire Route 12. The town also includes the villages of North Charlestown, South Charlestown and Hemlock Center.

== History ==
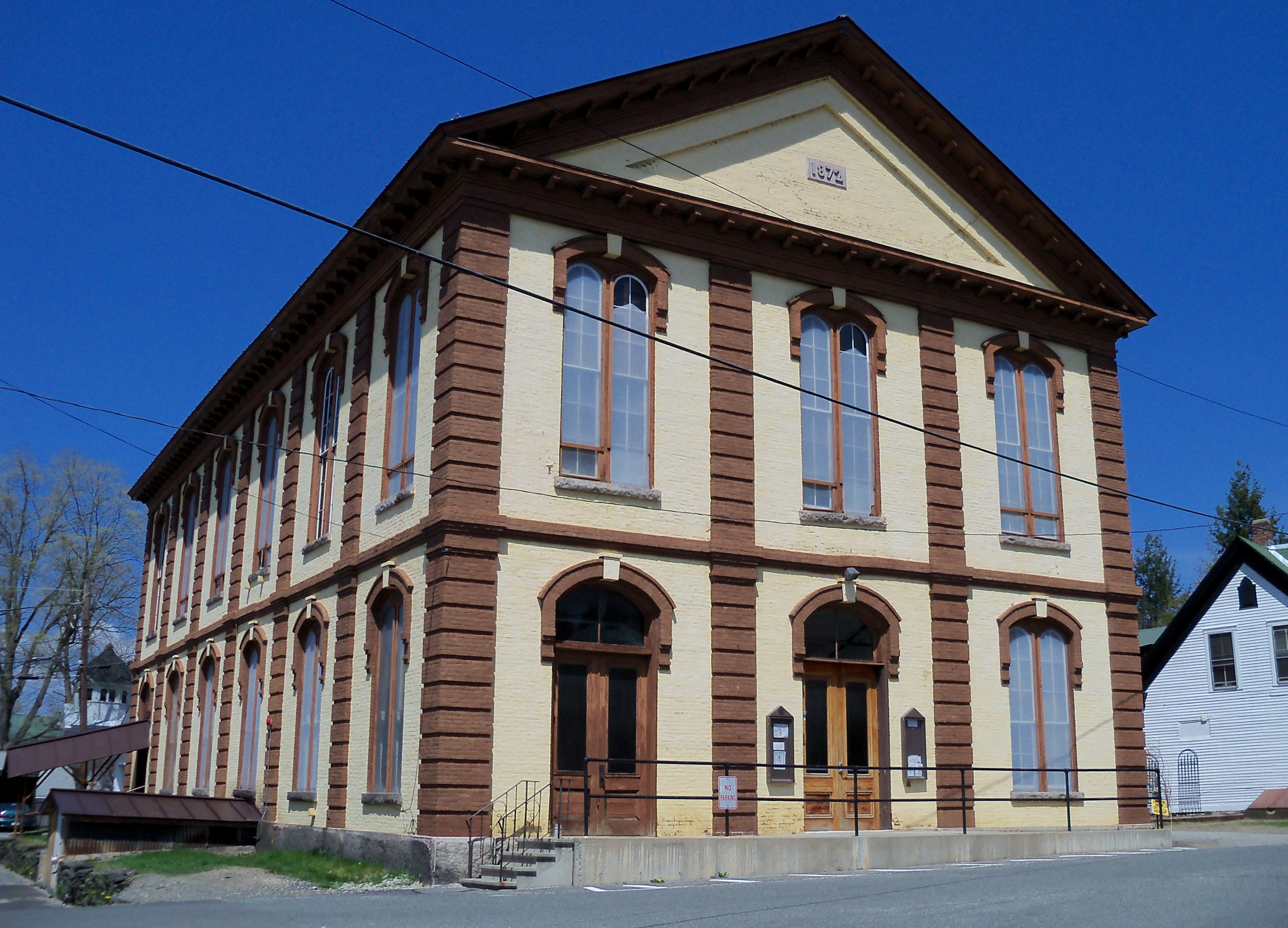
Charlestown Town hall

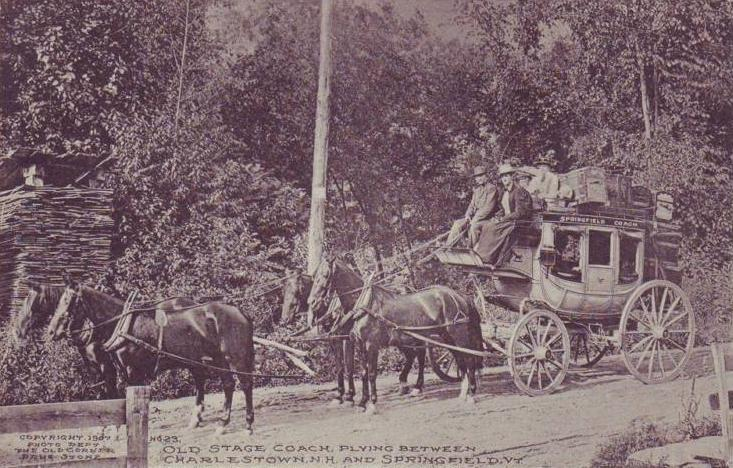
Old stage coach in 1907, plying between Charlestown and Springfield, Vermont

The area was first granted on December 31, 1735, by colonial governor Jonathan Belcher of Massachusetts as "Plantation No. 4", the fourth in a line of townships on the Connecticut River. (Note: Number 1 was in Chesterfield, Number 2 was in Westmoreland, and Number 3 was in Walpole.) Settled in 1740, it was the northernmost township, and its 1744 stockade now known as Fort at Number 4 became a strategic military site. On the evening of May 2, 1746, Seth Putnam joined Major Josiah Willard and several soldiers as they escorted women to milk the cows. As they approached the barn, Natives hiding in the bushes opened fire, killing Putnam, "the first victim of [Native] vengeance". In 1747, during King George's War, the fort was besieged for three days by a force of French and Native people. Captain Phineas Stevens and 31 militia stationed at the fort repelled the attack, with their success becoming well known.

On July 2, 1753, the town was rechartered as "Charlestown" by Governor Benning Wentworth, after Admiral Charles Knowles of the Royal Navy, then governor of Jamaica. Admiral Knowles, in port at Boston during the 1747 siege, sent Captain Stevens a sword to acknowledge his valor. The town responded by naming itself in his honor.

Early in the morning of August 30, 1754, Susannah Willard Johnson along with her husband, her three children, her sister and two neighbors, Peter Labarree and Ebenezer Farnsworth, were captured by Abenaki people, marched to Montreal and incarcerated. Eventually they would all escape or be released and return home.

In 1781, Charlestown briefly joined Vermont because of dissatisfaction with treatment by the New Hampshire government. Returning at the insistence of George Washington, it was incorporated in 1783.

The community developed into a center for law and lawyers, second regionally only to Boston. Its prosperity would be expressed in fine architecture. Sixty-three buildings on Charlestown's Main Street are now listed on the National Register of Historic Places. They include the Gothic Revival South Parish Church erected by master-builder Stephen Hassam in 1842, St. Luke's Church designed by Richard Upjohn in 1863, and the Italianate Town Hall designed in 1872 by Edward Dow, New Hampshire's most prominent architect after the Civil War. Dow also designed Thompson Hall, the centerpiece of the University of New Hampshire.

In 1874, the Sullivan Railroad passed through the western side of Charlestown. The tracks are now part of the New England Central Railroad.

A reproduction of the Fort at Number 4 is now a historical site, where military reenactments and musters occur frequently throughout the summer months. Tours are offered of its stockaded parade ground and pioneer-style houses.

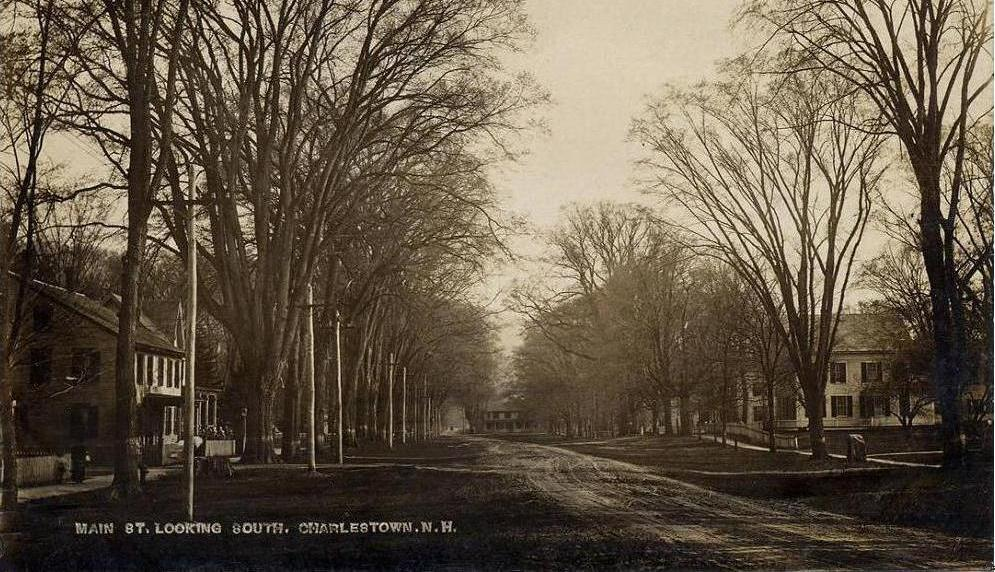
Main Street in 1909

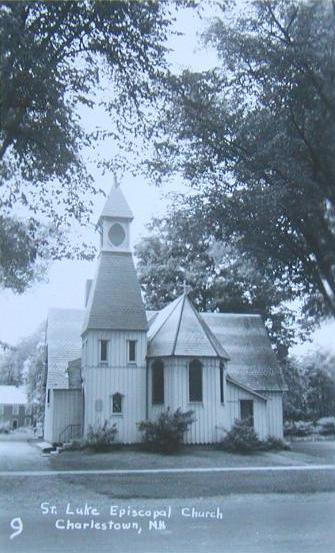
St. Luke's c. 1920

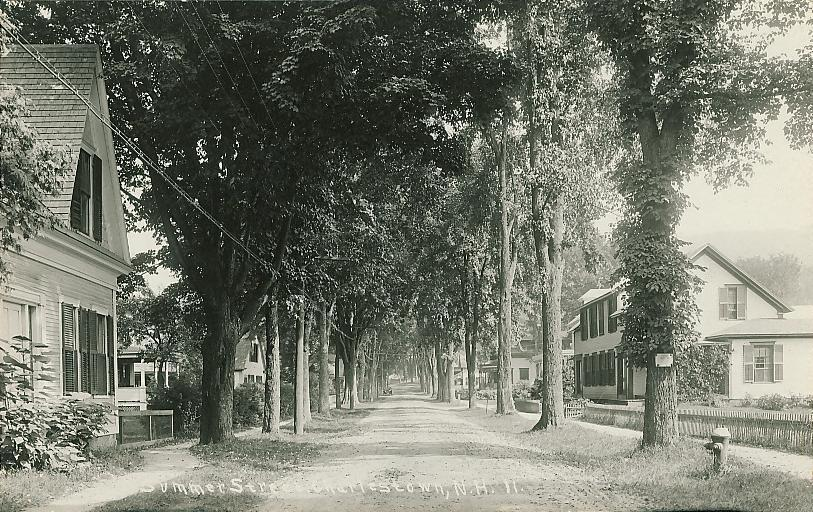
Summer Street in 1914

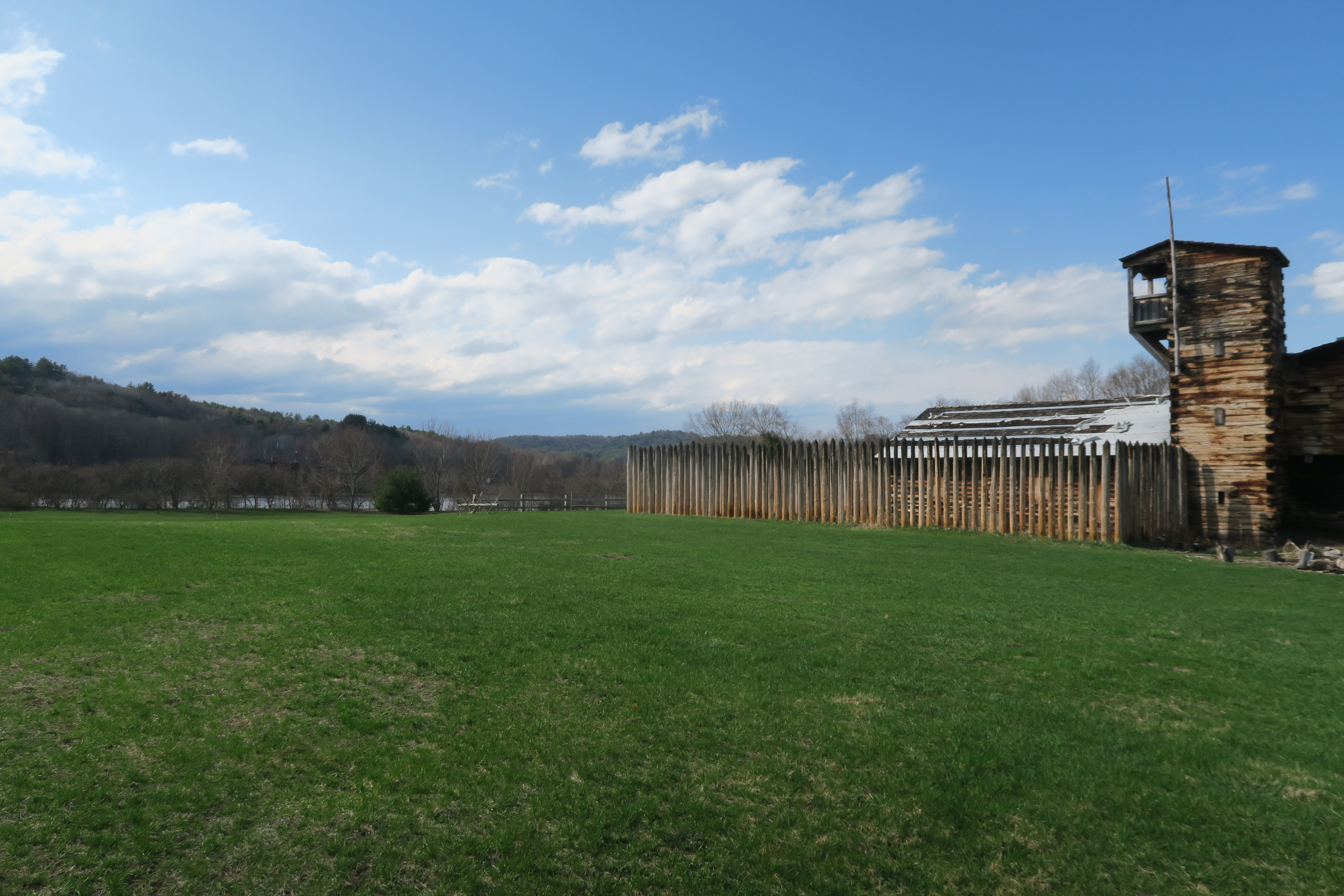
Fort at Number 4 in 2018

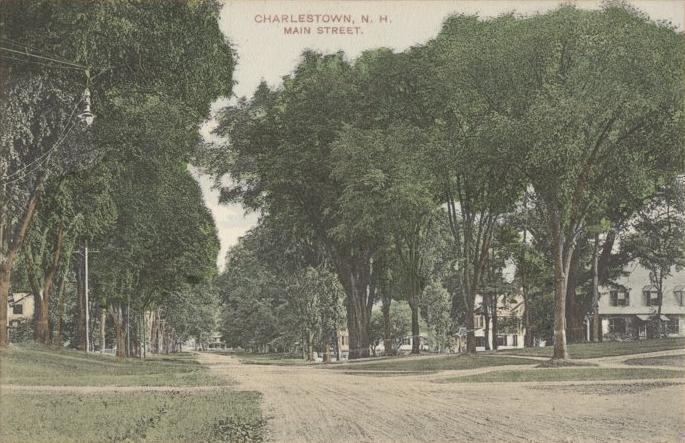
Main Street in 1910

== Geography ==
Charlestown is located along the Connecticut River, the western border of New Hampshire.

According to the United States Census Bureau, the town has a total area of 38.0 square miles (98.5 km^{2}), of which 35.8 sq mi (92.6 km^{2}) are land and 2.3 sq mi (5.9 km^{2}) are water, comprising 5.98% of the town. Charlestown is drained by several direct tributaries of the Connecticut River: Ox Brook, the Little Sugar River, Beaver Brook, Clay Brook, Dickerson Brook, and Jabes Meadow Brook. The highest point in town is Sams Hill, at 1,683 feet (513 m) above sea level in the southeast part of town.

In the Connecticut River in the 1800s were three islands within the limits of the town. Sartwell's Island, the largest, containing 10 acres (4.0 ha), was under high cultivation in 1874. The others contained about 6 acres (2.4 ha) each. None show on maps today, and were presumably inundated by the power dam built downstream at Bellows Falls.

=== Adjacent municipalities ===
- Claremont (north)
- Unity (northeast)
- Acworth (east)
- Langdon (south)
- Walpole (south)
- Rockingham, Vermont (southwest)
- Springfield, Vermont (west)

== Transportation ==
Charlestown is served by New Hampshire Routes 11, 12 and 12A. Routes 11 and 12 lead north from the town center 11 miles (18 km) to downtown Claremont. Route 12 leads south 7 miles (11 km) to North Walpole, adjacent to Bellows Falls, Vermont, and 28 miles (45 km) to Keene, New Hampshire. Route 11 leads northwest from the center of Charlestown to the Cheshire Bridge (the old toll bridge) across the Connecticut River, after which it becomes Vermont Route 11 and provides access to Interstate 91 and U.S. Route 5 in Vermont.

Bus service is available from Community Alliance Transport Services (CATS), with several buses a day connecting Charlestown and Claremont.

The New England Central Railroad has track rights through the town. Amtrak's Vermonter passenger rail line runs through Charlestown along the Connecticut River but does not stop in town. The closest stations are Bellows Falls to the south and Claremont to the north.

The nearest general aviation airports are Claremont Municipal Airport, 10 miles (16 km) to the north, and Hartness State Airport in North Springfield, Vermont, 11 miles (18 km) to the northwest. The nearest airport with scheduled airline service is Lebanon Municipal Airport, 33 miles (53 km) to the north in West Lebanon.

== Public safety ==
Charlestown is served by a full-time police department and volunteer fire department. Charlestown's ambulance service is provided by Golden Cross Ambulance out of Claremont. The town's emergency services are dispatched by the Charlestown Police Department dispatch center and headed by Chief Patrick Connors.

Charlestown falls within Troop C of the New Hampshire State Police.

== Demographics ==
Historical population
Census	Pop.	Note	%±
1790	1,093		—
1800	1,364		24.8%
1810	1,501		10.0%
1820	1,702		13.4%
1830	1,773		4.2%
1840	1,722		−2.9%
1850	1,644		−4.5%
1860	1,758		6.9%
1870	1,741		−1.0%
1880	1,587		−8.8%
1890	1,466		−7.6%
1900	1,473		0.5%
1910	1,496		1.6%
1920	1,505		0.6%
1930	1,644		9.2%
1940	1,756		6.8%
1950	2,077		18.3%
1960	2,576		24.0%
1970	3,274		27.1%
1980	4,417		34.9%
1990	4,630		4.8%
2000	4,749		2.6%
2010	5,114		7.7%
2020	4,806		−6.0%
U.S. Decennial Census 2020

As of the census of 2010, there were 5,114 people, 2,117 households, and 1,399 families residing in the town. There were 2,263 housing units, of which 146, or 6.5%, were vacant. The racial makeup of the town was 97.8% white, 0.4% African American, 0.2% Native American, 0.4% Asian, 0.0% Native Hawaiian or Pacific Islander, 0.1% some other race, and 1.0% from two or more races. 0.8% of the population were Hispanic or Latino of any race.

Of the 2,117 households, 28.8% had children under the age of 18 living with them, 50.4% were headed by married couples living together, 10.0% had a female householder with no husband present, and 33.9% were non-families. 27.4% of all households were made up of individuals, and 11.3% were someone living alone who was 65 years of age or older. The average household size was 2.38, and the average family size was 2.84.

In the town, 20.7% of the population were under the age of 18, 7.7% were from 18 to 24, 23.3% from 25 to 44, 32.4% from 45 to 64, and 16.2% were 65 years of age or older. The median age was 43.9 years. For every 100 females, there were 97.2 males. For every 100 females age 18 and over, there were 94.4 males.

For the period 2011–2015, the estimated median annual income for a household was $41,471, and the median income for a family was $52,708. The per capita income for the town was $23,527. 13.2% of the population and 9.5% of families were below the poverty line. 16.0% of the population under the age of 18 and 9.1% of those 65 or older were living in poverty.

== Sites of interest ==
- Charlestown Main Street Historic District

== Notable people ==
- Helen L. Bostwick (1826–1907), author, poet
- James Broderick (1927–1982), actor; father of Matthew Broderick
- William E. Corbin (1869–1951), inventor of the paper towel
- George Brintnall Dutton (1818–1898), Minnesota territorial legislator and lawyer
- Carlton "Pudge" Fisk (born 1947), Hall of Fame catcher with two teams
- Joseph Glidden (1813–1906), businessman, farmer; inventor of modern barbed wire
- Charles H. Hoyt (1859–1900), playwright, theatrical producer
- Henry Hubbard (1784–1857), US congressman, senator, 18th governor of New Hampshire
- Samuel Hunt (1765–1807), US congressman
- Susannah Willard Johnson (1729–1810), Anglo-American woman captured and sold off into slavery
- Benjamin Labaree (1801–1883), minister, professor and college president
- Ralph Metcalf (1796–1858), 25th governor of New Hampshire
- Simeon Olcott (1735–1815), attorney, US senator
- DeForest Richards (1846–1903), banker, farmer, fifth governor of Wyoming
- Richard H. Sylvester (1830–1895), journalist
- James Tufts (1829–1884), acting governor of Montana Territory
- Benjamin West (1746–1817), lawyer
- Francis H. West (1825–1896), Union brigadier general during the Civil War
- Alexander Hamilton Willard (1777–1865), blacksmith who joined the Lewis and Clark Expedition
