= New Hampshire Route 12 =

State highway in southwestern New Hampshire, US

New Hampshire Route 12
- Map of western New Hampshire with NH 12 highlighted in red

Route information
- Maintained by NHDOT
- Length: 62.773 mi (101.023 km)

Major junctions
- South end: Route 12 in Winchendon, MA
- NH 9 / NH 10 / NH 101 in Keene
- North end: VT 12 in Ascutney, VT

Location
- Country: United States
- State: New Hampshire
- Counties: Cheshire, Sullivan

Highway system
- New Hampshire Highway System; Interstate; US; State; Turnpikes
← NH 11	→ NH 13
← Route 11	N.E.	→ Route 12A

New Hampshire Route 12 is a 62.773-mile (101.023 km) long north–south state highway in southwestern New Hampshire. Its southern terminus is at the Massachusetts state line in Fitzwilliam, where it continues south as Massachusetts Route 12. Its northern terminus is at the Vermont state line in Claremont (a terminus it shares with New Hampshire Route 103), where it continues north as Vermont Route 12. Most of the northern part of NH 12 runs along the Connecticut River.

Its number is derived from its original 1922 designation as New England Interstate Route 12 (also known as the "Keene Way"). Present-day Vermont Route 12, New Hampshire Route 12, Massachusetts Route 12 and Connecticut Route 12 still mostly follow the original route. The 283.3-mile (455.9 km) four-state series of State Route 12s extend from Morrisville, Vermont, to Groton, Connecticut.

== Route description ==
=== Fitzwilliam to Keene ===
NH 12 begins in Fitzwilliam where it connects to Massachusetts Route 12 at the state line. The highway heads northwest into the town center where it crosses NH 119. NH 12 continues northwest through Troy, then dips into parts of Marlborough and Swanzey before entering the city of Keene. Immediately after crossing into Keene, NH 12 intersects the northern terminus of NH 32 then meets NH 101 near Keene State College. NH 12 turns west along NH 101, then meets NH 10 at a roundabout. NH 10 joins NH 12 and NH 101 west to the next intersection at NH 9. NH 101 ends while NH 10 and NH 12 turn north with NH 9 eastbound in tow. The three routes are multiplexed for 1.2 miles (1.9 km) as they bypass downtown Keene to the west. NH 9 and NH 10 split off at a trumpet interchange while NH 12 continues northwest. The highway interchanges with NH 12A on its way out of town.

=== Surry to Charlestown ===
NH 12 enters the southwestern corner of Surry, then turns nearly due west, crossing into the town of Westmoreland. It intersects the northern terminus of NH 63 near the Connecticut River, then turns north and enters Walpole. Now paralleling the eastern bank of the river, NH 12 heads north towards the town center. It intersects with NH 123, which connects to U.S. Route 5 in the neighboring town of Westminster, Vermont. NH 123 south joins NH 12 north and the two routes run in a wrong-way concurrency until crossing the Cold River, where NH 123 splits off to the east. NH 12 continues north along the river and crosses into Charlestown where it meets the northern terminus of NH 12A. The highway continues through downtown, then intersects NH 11, which connects to Interstate 91 and US 5 in nearby Springfield, Vermont. NH 11 east joins NH 12 north and the two routes continue north. A second, northern segment of NH 12A splits off to bypass Claremont while NH 11 and NH 12 head towards the downtown area.

=== Claremont ===
In downtown Claremont NH 11 and NH 12 intersect with NH 103 and split after a 10.0-mile (16.1 km) overlap. Facilitated by a traffic circle, NH 11 joins NH 103 eastbound while NH 12 joins NH 103 westbound. NH 12 and NH 103 cross the Sugar River, then parallel it to the northwest (which they do for the remainder of their lengths) back towards the Connecticut River. Heading west, NH 12 and NH 103 cross NH 12A, then turn northwest and cross the river into Ascutney, Vermont. NH 103 ends at the state line while NH 12 becomes Vermont Route 12.

== History ==

NH 12 was originally designated in 1922 as part of New England Interstate Route 12, a 279-mile (449 km) regional highway stretching from Route 1 (modern U.S. Route 1, which partly runs on Interstate 95) in New London, Connecticut, to Derby, Vermont, where it terminated at Route 2 (modern U.S. Route 5) near the border with Quebec. It was known as the "Keene Way," reflecting its route through Keene, New Hampshire.

In 1926, the New England road marking system was usurped by the system of United States Numbered Highways and in ca. 1932, Route 12 was redesignated as state highways bearing the number 12 (although a portion of Route 12 in southern Connecticut swapped designations with Route 32 at the same time). In the 1960s, VT 12 was truncated from Derby to its present terminus in Morrisville, with the former highway remaining as parts of VT 14, VT 16 and US 5. The highway as a whole has remained largely unchanged since.

== Junction list ==
County	Location	mi	km	Destinations	Notes
Cheshire	Fitzwilliam	0.000	0.000	Route 12 south (School Street) – Winchendon	Continuation from Massachusetts
Cheshire	Fitzwilliam	5.492	8.839	NH 119 – Rindge, Winchester	
Cheshire	Keene	17.066	27.465	NH 32 (Old Homestead Hwy.) – Swanzey Ctr., Dillant–Hopkins Airport	
Cheshire	Keene	17.957	28.899	NH 101 east – Peterborough	Southern end of concurrency with NH 101
Cheshire	Keene	18.703	30.100	NH 10 south (Winchester Street) – Winchester	Southern end of concurrency with NH 10
Cheshire	Keene	19.196	30.893	NH 9 west (Franklin Pierce Hwy.) – Brattleboro, VT	Western terminus of NH 101; southern end of concurrency with NH 9
Cheshire	Keene	19.941	32.092	West Street – Keene	Interchange
Cheshire	Keene	20.396	32.824	NH 9 east / NH 10 north (Franklin Pierce Hwy.) – Concord, Newport, Hillsborough, Henniker	Interchange; northern end of concurrency with NH 9 / NH 10
Cheshire	Keene	21.976	35.367	NH 12A (Maple Avenue) – Surry	Interchange; southern terminus of NH 12A (southern segment)
Cheshire	Westmoreland	30.417	48.951	NH 63 – Westmoreland, Chesterfield	Northern terminus of NH 63
Cheshire	Walpole	36.142	58.165	NH 123 north (Dwinnell Street) to I-91 / US 5 – Westminster, VT	Southern end of wrong-way concurrency with NH 123
Cheshire	Walpole	38.867	62.550	NH 123 south (Whitcomb Road) – Alstead	Northern end of wrong-way concurrency with NH 123
Cheshire	Walpole	40.494	65.169	To I-91 / US 5 (Arch Bridge) – Bellows Falls, VT	
Sullivan	Charlestown	44.162	71.072	NH 12A – Langdon, Alstead	Northern terminus of NH 12A (southern segment)
Sullivan	Charlestown	48.487	78.032	NH 11 west (Springfield Road) to I-91 – Springfield, VT	Southern end of concurrency with NH 11
Sullivan	Charlestown	52.350	84.249	NH 12A (River Road) – North Charlestown, Ascutney, VT	Southern terminus of NH 12A (northern segment)
Sullivan	Claremont	58.435	94.042	NH 11 east / NH 103 east (Tremont Street) – Newport	Northern end of concurrency with NH 11; southern end of concurrency with NH 103
Sullivan	Claremont	62.228	100.146	NH 12A (Jarvis Hill Road / Windsor Road) – North Charlestown, West Lebanon	
Sullivan	Claremont	62.773	101.023	VT 12 north to I-91 – Ascutney	Western terminus of NH 103; continuation into Vermont
1.000 mi = 1.609 km; 1.000 km = 0.621 mi: Concurrency terminus

== New Hampshire Route 12A ==
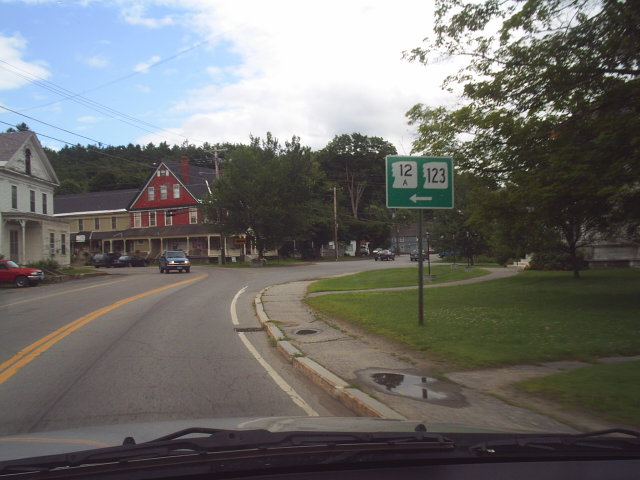
Route 12A and Route 123 concurrency

New Hampshire Route 12A is a designation held by two state highways which bypass separate sections of NH 12. Although not directly connected, the two segments are linked by an 8.2-mile (13.2 km) section of NH 12 in Charlestown.

=== Southern segment ===
New Hampshire Route 12A
- Location: Keene–Charlestown
- Length: 21.598 mi (34.759 km)

The southern segment of NH 12A is a 21.598-mile-long (34.759 km) loop route of NH 12 which bypasses Westmoreland and Walpole. Its southern terminus is at an interchange with NH 12 in Keene. Its northern terminus is at an intersection with NH 12 in Charlestown.

This section of NH 12A begins at an interchange with NH 12 north of downtown Keene. The highway initially heads northeast, then turns north to parallel the Ashuelot River and enters the town of Surry. NH 12A passes through the center of Surry and continues north into Alstead. In Alstead, NH 12A continues north until intersecting with NH 123. NH 12A joins NH 123 and the highway intersects NH 123A before turning west along the Cold River. The road turns north to cross the river, then NH 12A splits from NH 123. NH 12A continues northwest through the town of Langdon before crossing into Charlestown. NH 12A terminates at NH 12 in the southern end of town.

County	Location	mi	km	Destinations	Notes
Cheshire	Keene	0.0	0.0	NH 12 to NH 9 / NH 10 – Walpole, Charlestown, Keene, Troy	Southern terminus
Cheshire	Surry			No major junctions	
Cheshire	Alstead	14.5	23.3	NH 123 south (Forest Road) – East Alstead, Marlow	Southern end of concurrency with NH 123
Cheshire	Alstead	15.3	24.6	NH 123A east (Acworth Road) – Acworth, Newport	Western terminus of NH 123A
Cheshire	Alstead	16.0	25.7	NH 123 north (River Road) – Walpole	Northern end of concurrency with NH 123
Sullivan	Langdon			No major junctions	
Sullivan	Charlestown	21.6	34.8	NH 12 (Bellows Falls Road) – Charlestown, Claremont, Keene	Northern terminus
1.000 mi = 1.609 km; 1.000 km = 0.621 mi: Concurrency terminus

=== Northern segment ===
New Hampshire Route 12A
- Location: Charlestown–W. Lebanon
- Length: 26.900 mi (43.291 km)

The northern segment of NH 12A is a 26.900-mile-long (43.291 km) long spur route of NH 12 that travels south-to-north along the eastern side of the Connecticut River. Its southern terminus is at an intersection with NH 11 and NH 12 in Charlestown. Its northern terminus is at US 4 and NH 10 in Lebanon.

This section of NH 12A starts in northern Charlestown where it splits from NH 11 / NH 12. It runs along the eastern side of the Connecticut River, bypassing downtown Claremont to the west. After crossing the Sugar River, NH 12A crosses NH 12 and NH 103, which cross into Ascutney, Vermont, just to the west.

Now paralleling its parent route, which has become Vermont Route 12 across the river, NH 12A continues north into the town of Cornish. Bridge Street offers a local connection to VT 12, US 5 and VT 44 in neighboring Windsor, Vermont. NH 12A continues through western Plainfield without any major junctions, then enters the city of Lebanon. NH 12A continues north and interchanges with Interstate 89 before terminating at US 4 / NH 10 in West Lebanon village.

County	Location	mi	km	Destinations	Notes
Sullivan	Charlestown	0.0	0.0	NH 11 / NH 12 (Claremont Road) – Claremont, Charlestown, Keene	Southern terminus
Sullivan	Claremont	7.5	12.1	NH 12 / NH 103 (Main Street) to I-91 / US 5 – Claremont, Newport, Ascutney, VT	
Sullivan	Cornish	12.9	20.8	Bridge Street to I-91 – Windsor, VT	
Grafton	Lebanon	25.8	41.5	I-89 to I-91 – Lebanon, Concord, Vermont	Exit 20 on I-89
Grafton	Lebanon	26.9	43.3	US 4 / NH 10 (Main Street / Seminary Hill Road)	Northern terminus
1.000 mi = 1.609 km; 1.000 km = 0.621 mi

== Related routes ==
- New England Interstate Route 12, the designation carried by NH 12 in the 1920s

== See also ==
- List of state highways in New Hampshire
