= List of covered bridges in New Hampshire =

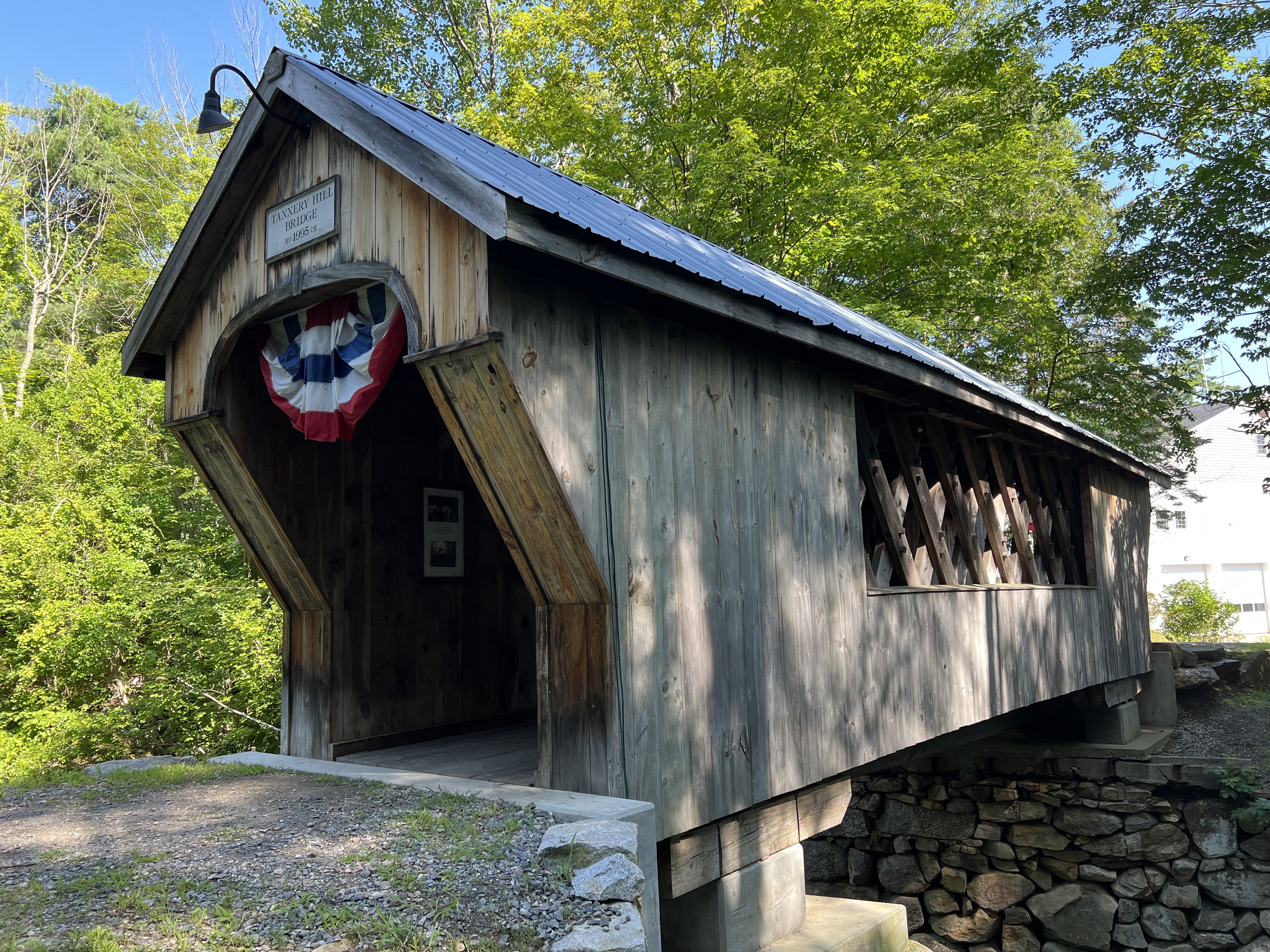
Tannery Hill Covered Bridge in Gilford, built in 1995

This is a list of New Hampshire covered bridges, old, new, and restored. There are 58 historic wooden covered bridges currently standing and assigned official numbers by the U.S. state of New Hampshire. There are additional covered bridges extant in the state, some of which are on private property and not accessible to the public. The newest covered bridge known to have been constructed in the state is Chester's Wason Bridge, built in 2011 by the Timber Framers Guild.

== Standing covered bridges ==
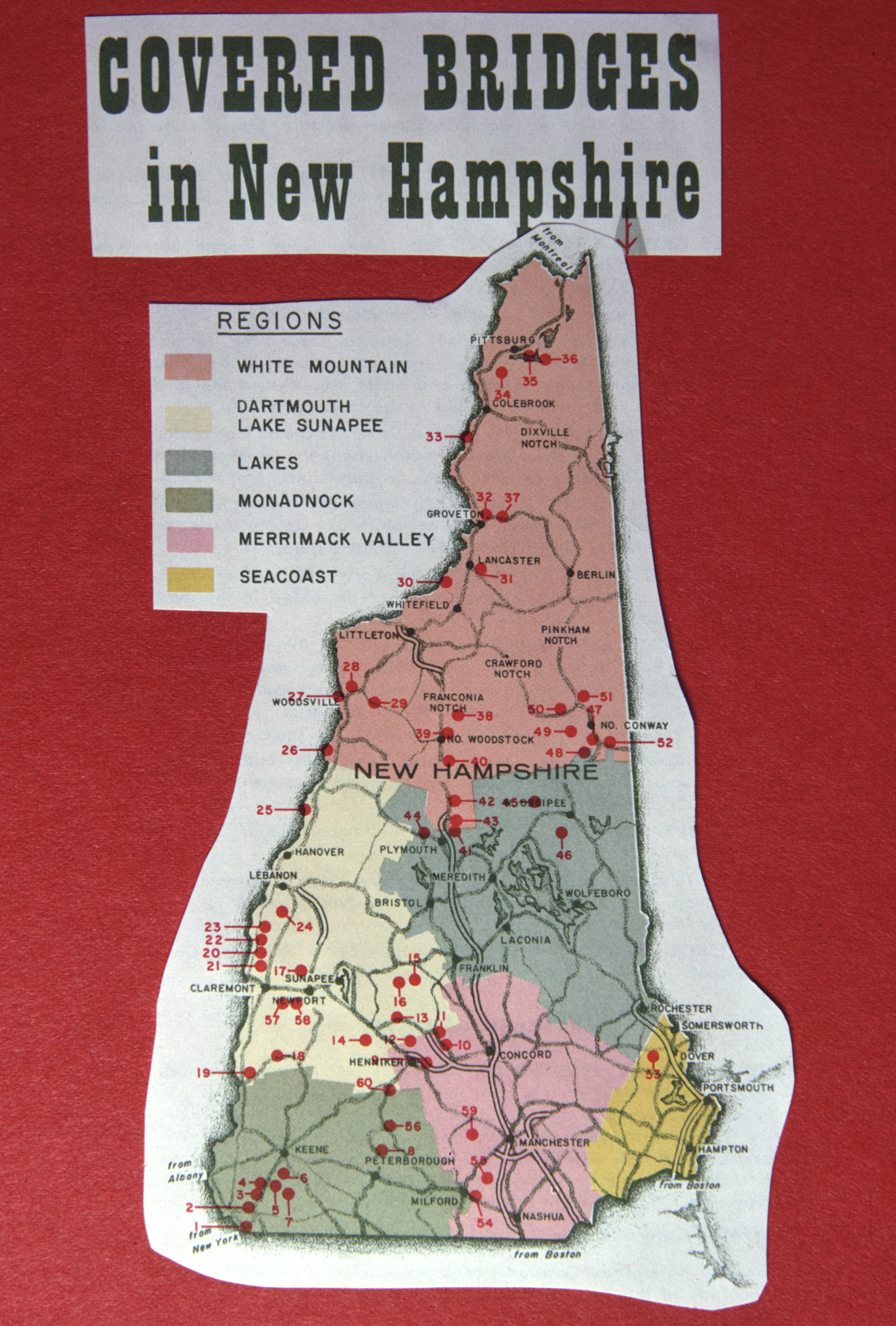
A map of numbered covered bridges in New Hampshire, 1967

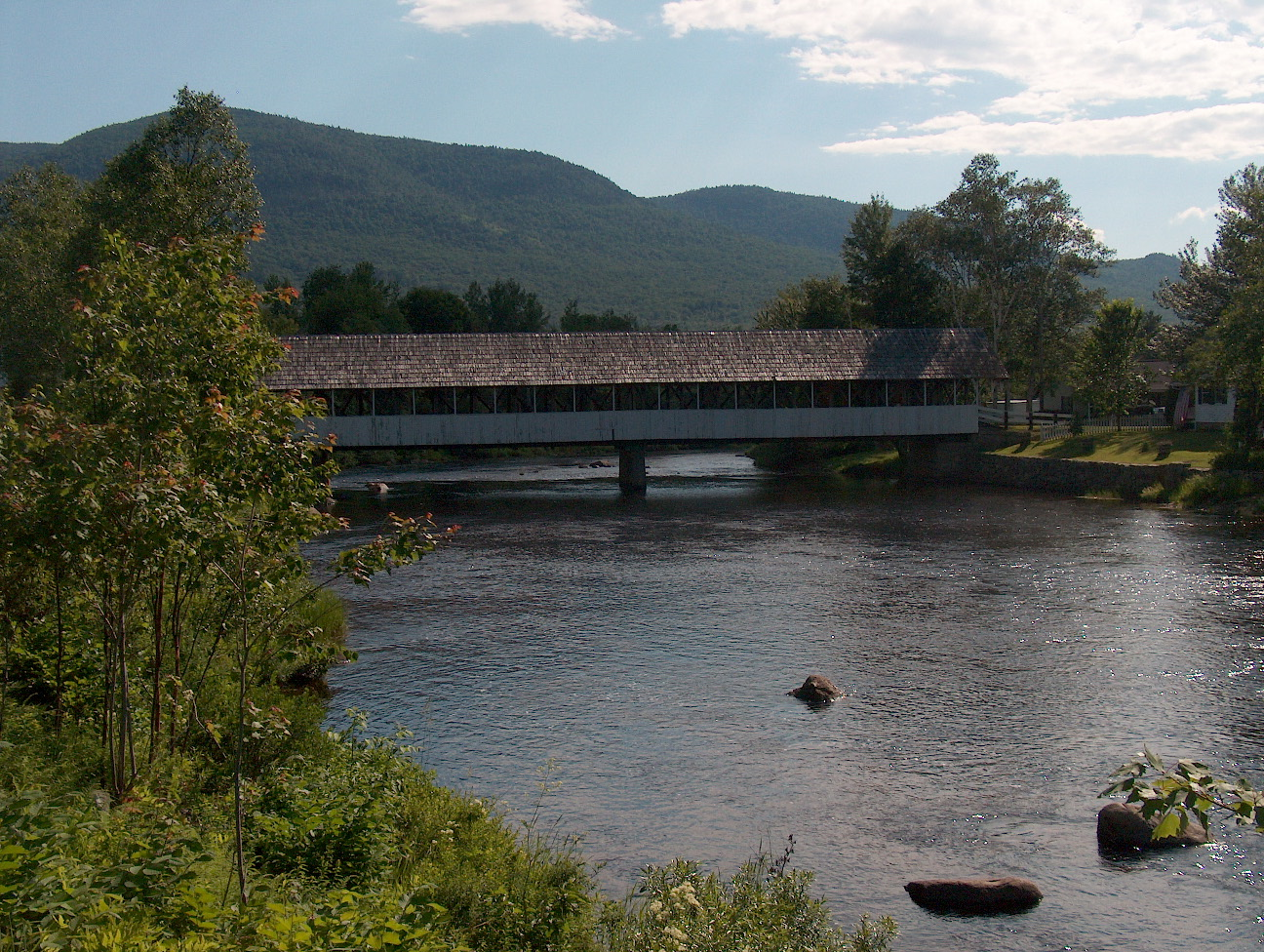
Stark Covered Bridge, built in 1857, over the Upper Ammonoosuc River

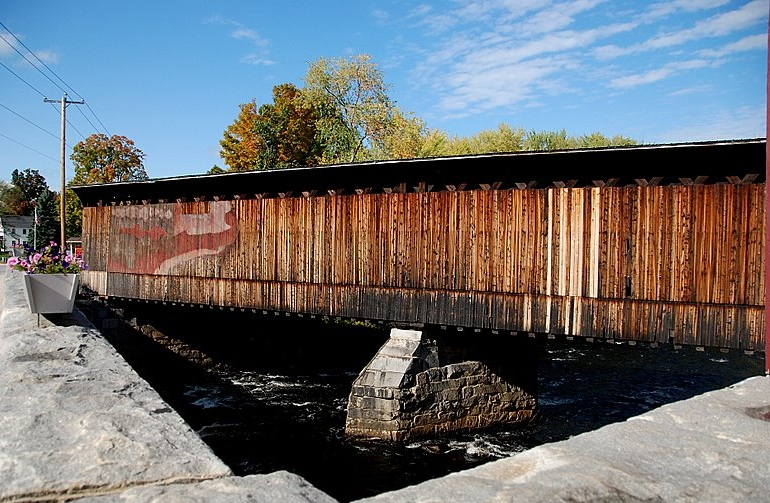
Contoocook Railroad Bridge is the oldest covered railroad bridge of its kind in the United States

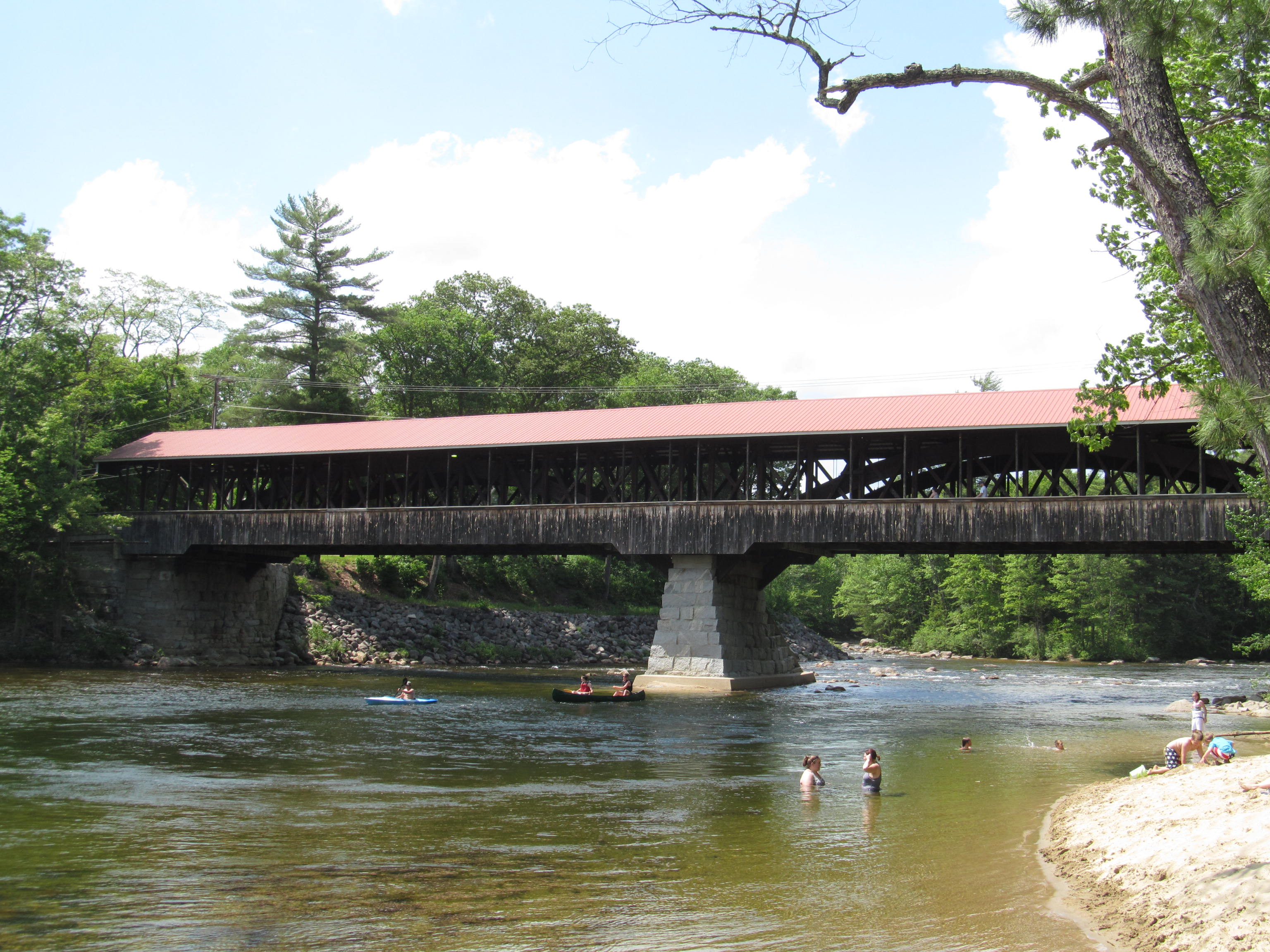
Conway is home to the Saco River Bridge, built in 1890

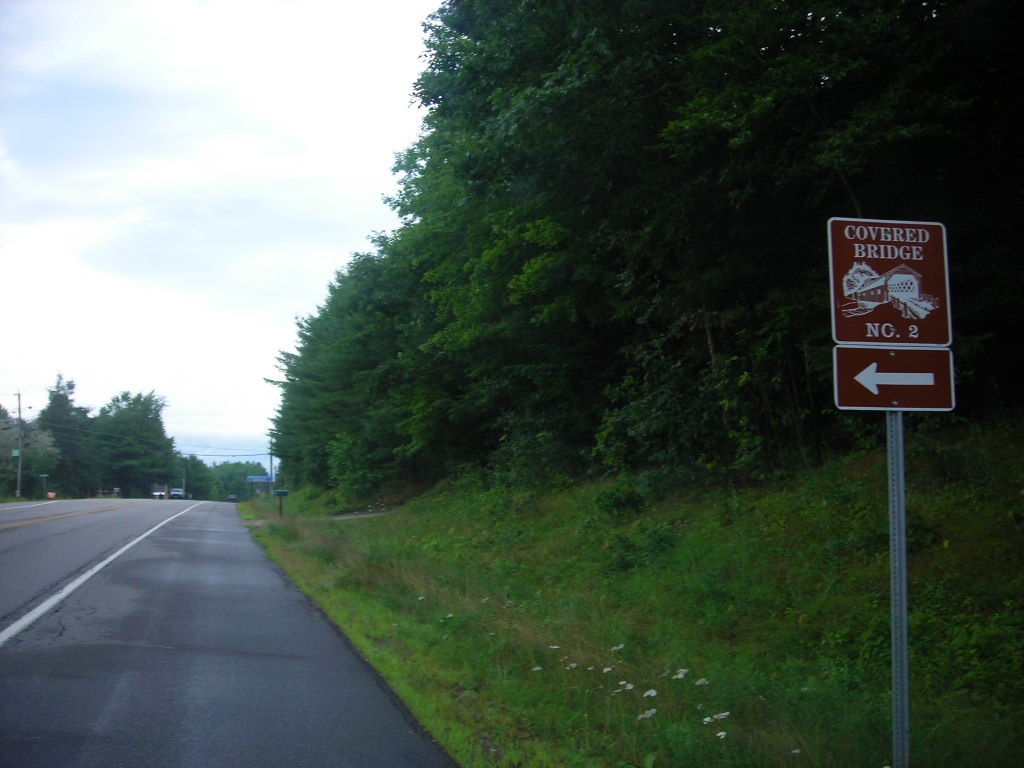
Sign for NH Covered Bridge No. 2 (Coombs Covered Bridge) along NH Route 10

Some bridges go by two or more names; this list uses the name posted on the bridge.

Name	Image	Location	Waterbody	Year built	NH # (Note: Covered bridge number, as issued by the state; extant bridges are not numbered sequentially.)	Notes
Allen Hollis Bridge		Woodstock	Lost River	1981		Foot traffic only.
Ashuelot Bridge		Ashuelot	Ashuelot River	1864	1	Also called Village Bridge or Village Station Bridge.
Bacon Bridge		Pittsburg	Connecticut River	1876	34	State calls it the Pittsburg–Clarksville Covered Bridge. Beside a rushing rapids. Leads to a meadow. Sign: "Bypass / Historic." Foot traffic only.
Bartlett Bridge		Bartlett	Saco River	1851	50	Contains the Covered Bridge Gift Shoppe. Foot traffic only.
Bath Bridge		Bath	Ammonoosuc River	1832	28	Car and foot traffic.
Bement Bridge		Bradford	West Branch Warner River	1854	14	Car traffic only.
Blacksmith Shop Bridge		Cornish	Mill Brook	1881	21	Foot traffic only.
Blair Bridge		Campton	Pemigewasset River	1869	41	Overhead sign: "Five dollars fine for riding or driving on this bridge faster than a walk." Car traffic only.
Blow-Me-Down Bridge		Cornish	Blow-me-down Brook	1877	23	Car traffic only.
Bog Bridge		Andover	Pleasant Brook	1887	16	Also called Cilleyville Bridge. Car traffic only.
Brundage Bridge		Grafton	Mill Brook	1957		Rural. Foot traffic only.
Bump Bridge		Campton	Beebe River	1972	43	Car traffic only.
Carlton Bridge		Swanzey	South Branch Ashuelot River	1869	7	Car traffic only.
Chester Bridge		Chester	Wason Brook	2011		Also called Wason Pond Covered Bridge. Built by the Timber Framers Guild and volunteers. Foot traffic only.
Chocorua Ski and Beach Bridge		Tamworth	Chocorua River	1992		Car traffic only.
Clark's Bridge		North Woodstock	Pemigewasset River	1904	64	Part of the Clark's Bears compound. Railroad traffic only. Moved from Vermont, where it originally spanned the Winooski River, to its current location circa 1965. Clark's Bridge is the only known covered railroad bridge still in active use.
Cold River Bridge		Langdon	Cold River	1869	18	Also called McDermott Bridge. Foot traffic only.
Columbia Bridge		Columbia	Connecticut River	1911	33 (Note: Columbia Bridge is listed on the state's website as No. 28, which appears to be a typo.)	Car traffic only.
Contoocook Railroad Bridge		Contoocook	Contoocook River	1849–50	10	Also called Hopkinton Railroad Covered Bridge. The state lists it simply as "Railroad Bridge". Oldest covered railroad bridge in the U.S.
Coombs Bridge		Winchester	Ashuelot River	1843	2	Car traffic only.
Corbin Bridge		Newport	North Branch Sugar River	1994	17	Car traffic only.
Cornish–Windsor Bridge		Cornish, New Hampshire and Windsor, Vermont	Connecticut River	1866	20	Longest wooden covered bridge in the U.S., 449 feet (137 m), until surpassed in 2008. Car traffic only.
Dalton Bridge		Warner	Warner River	1853	12	Car traffic only.
Dingleton Hill Bridge		Cornish	Mill Brook	1882	22	Car traffic only.
Durgin Bridge		Sandwich	Cold River	1869	45	Sign is on Route 113. Car traffic only.
Edgell Bridge		Lyme	Clay Brook	1885	25	Car traffic only.
Flume Bridge		Lincoln	Pemigewasset River	1886	39	Car traffic only.
Friendship Bridge		Wentworth	Baker River	1962; 2016	71	Constructed 1962 as Goffe's Mill Covered Bridge in Bedford. Reconstructed in Wentworth in 2016. Named the Friendship Bridge by the Friends of Wentworth Parks and Recreation non-profit, owners of the bridge. Foot traffic only.
Groveton Bridge		Groveton	Upper Ammonoosuc River	1852	32	No name plate. Has picnic tables inside. Sign: "Welcome to North Country ATV Trail System." Foot and ATV traffic only.
Hancock–Greenfield Bridge		Hancock and Greenfield	Contoocook River	1937	8	Also called County Bridge. Car traffic only.
Happy Corner Bridge		Pittsburg	Perry Stream	1850s?	35	Decorated with Christmas lights. Posted "Fishermen: Fly Fishing Only" with rules. Car and foot traffic.
Haverhill–Bath Bridge		Bath	Ammonoosuc River	1829	27	The state lists it as the Bath–Haverhill Bridge. Spans a rushing spillway. Foot traffic only.
Henniker / New England College		Henniker	Contoocook River	1972	63	At New England College. Foot traffic only.
Jackson Bridge		Jackson	Ellis River	1876	51	Car and foot traffic.
HoodKroft Bridge		Derry	Beaver Brook	1980s		Part of the HoodKroft Country Club. Golf cart and foot traffic only.
Jack O Lantern Bridge		Woodstock	Pond	1987		Part of the Jack O Lantern Resort and Golf Course.
Keniston Bridge		Andover	Blackwater River	1882	15	Car traffic only.
Little Red Bridge		Candia		1961		Part of Candia Woods Golf Links. Golf cart and foot traffic only.
Mechanic Street Bridge		Lancaster	Israel River	1862	31	No name plate. Also called Israels River Bridge. Sign: "Built Lancaster, N.H. 1862". Rebuilt 2006. Car traffic only.
Melendy Pond Bridge		Hudson	First Brook	1982		Foot traffic only.
Meriden Bridge		Plainfield	Bloods Brook	1880	24	Also called Mill Bridge. Car traffic only.
Mount Orne Bridge		Lancaster	Connecticut River	1911	30	No name plate; sign "1911 1983". Connects Lancaster, New Hampshire, and Lunenberg, Vermont. Car traffic only.
Nepalese Bridge		Randolph	Mossy Glen Waterfalls	1968		Foot traffic only.
Nissitissit Foot Bridge		Brookline	Nissitissit River	1978		Foot traffic only.
Packard Hill Bridge		Lebanon	Mascoma River	1991	67	Car and foot traffic.
Pier Bridge		Newport	Sugar River	1907	57	Also called Chandler Station Bridge. Foot traffic only.
Prentiss Bridge		Langdon	Great Brook	1874	19	Shortest covered bridge in New Hampshire, 36 feet (11 m). Foot traffic only.
River Road Bridge		Pittsburg	Perry Stream	1858	36	Shifted off its roadbed to one side. Needs repair. Foot traffic only.
Riverwalk Bridge		Littleton	Ammonoosuc River	2004		Long footbridge connecting downtown and a park with weekly Farmer's Market. Plaque: "Built by the town of Littleton, N.H." Foot traffic only.
Rowell Bridge		West Hopkinton	Contoocook River	1853	9	Car traffic only.
Royal Crest Bridge		Nashua	Spit Brook	1970		Part of Royal Crest Estates Apartments. Foot traffic only.
Saco River Bridge		Conway	Saco River	1890	48	Car and foot traffic.
Sawyers Crossing Bridge		Swanzey	Ashuelot River	1859	6	Replaced an earlier bridge built in 1771. Car traffic only.
Sentinel Pine Bridge		Lincoln	Pemigewasset River	1939	38	In Franconia Notch State Park at Flume Gorge. Foot traffic only.
Slate Bridge		Swanzey	Ashuelot River	2001	4	Destroyed by fire in 1993, rebuilt in 2001.
Smith Millennium Bridge		Plymouth	Baker River	2001	44	Third bridge built on the site. "The strongest covered bridge in the world." Car and foot traffic.
Squam River Bridge		Ashland	Squam River	1990	65	Car and foot traffic.
Stowell Road Bridge		Merrimack	Baboosic Brook	1990	66	Car traffic only.
Stark Bridge		Stark	Upper Ammonoosuc River	1857 or 1862	37	Beautiful bridge decorated with pendant acorn finials and painted bright white. No name plate. In the center of town. Car and foot traffic.
Sulphite Railroad Bridge		Franklin	Winnipesaukee River	1896	62	Only remaining deck-covered railroad bridge in the U.S. Also called the "Upside Down Bridge" because the railroad ran over the top, now discontinued. Damaged by arson in 1980. No access.
Swift River Bridge		Conway	Swift River	1869	47	Foot traffic only.
Swiftwater Bridge		Bath	Wild Ammonoosuc River	1849	29	Car traffic only.
Tannery Hill Bridge		Gilford	Gunstock River	1995	68	Plaque: "Constructed by the Gilford Rotary Club. Tim Andrews - Bridgebuilder." Foot traffic only.
Teixeira Park Bridge		Peterborough	Nubanusit Brook	1965		In Teixeira Park.
Turkey Jim's Bridge		Campton	West Branch Brook	1958	42	Restored in 1958, washed out in 1964, restored in 2013. Inside the Branch Brook Campground. Foot traffic only.
Waterloo Bridge		Warner	Warner River	1840	13	Car traffic only.
Wentworth Golf Club		Jackson	Ellis River	1991		Part of the Wentworth Golf Club course. Golf cart and foot traffic only.
West Swanzey Bridge		Swanzey	Ashuelot River	1832	5	Also called Thompson Bridge. Car and foot traffic.
Albany Bridge		Albany	Swift River	1858	49	Also called Albany Bridge. Built in 1857, destroyed by windstorm in 1858, rebuilt in 1858. Car and foot traffic.
Whittier Bridge		Ossipee	Bearcamp River	1870s	46	Closed since 2008, currently located on dry land off of Nudd Road, restoration timeline unclear as of September 2019. Bridge reinstalled over the river in 2022.
Wright's Bridge		Newport	Sugar River	1906	58	Foot traffic only.
Yankee Barn Bridge		Grantham	Eastman Pond	1982		Part of the Eastman Community Association, not accessible to general public. Foot traffic only.
Stoney Morrell Bridge		Conway	Ditch	1999	70	On Kennett High School Campus.

== Lost covered bridges ==
This is a partial list of other covered bridges that once stood in New Hampshire.

Notable

- Bedell Covered Bridge (Haverhill, destroyed 1979)
- County Farm Bridge (Dover, burned 1981)
- Goffstown Covered Railroad Bridge (Goffstown, burned 1976)
- Hillsborough Railroad Bridge (Hillsborough, New Hampshire, burned 1985)
- New Henniker Bridge (West Hopkinton, dismantled 1936)

Others

- Androscoggin River Covered Bridge (Errol)
- Clear Stream Covered Bridge (Errol)
- Fields Bridge / Seaverns Bridge (Merrimack)
- Runnells Bridge (Hollis)
- Turkey Hill Bridge (Merrimack)
