= County Farm Bridge =

County Farm Bridge may refer to:

- County Farm Bridge (Dover, New Hampshire), a historic bridge over the Cocheco River in Dover, New Hampshire
- County Farm Bridge (Wilton, New Hampshire), a historic bridge in Wilton, New Hampshire
