= Prentiss Bridge =

- U.S. National Register of Historic Places
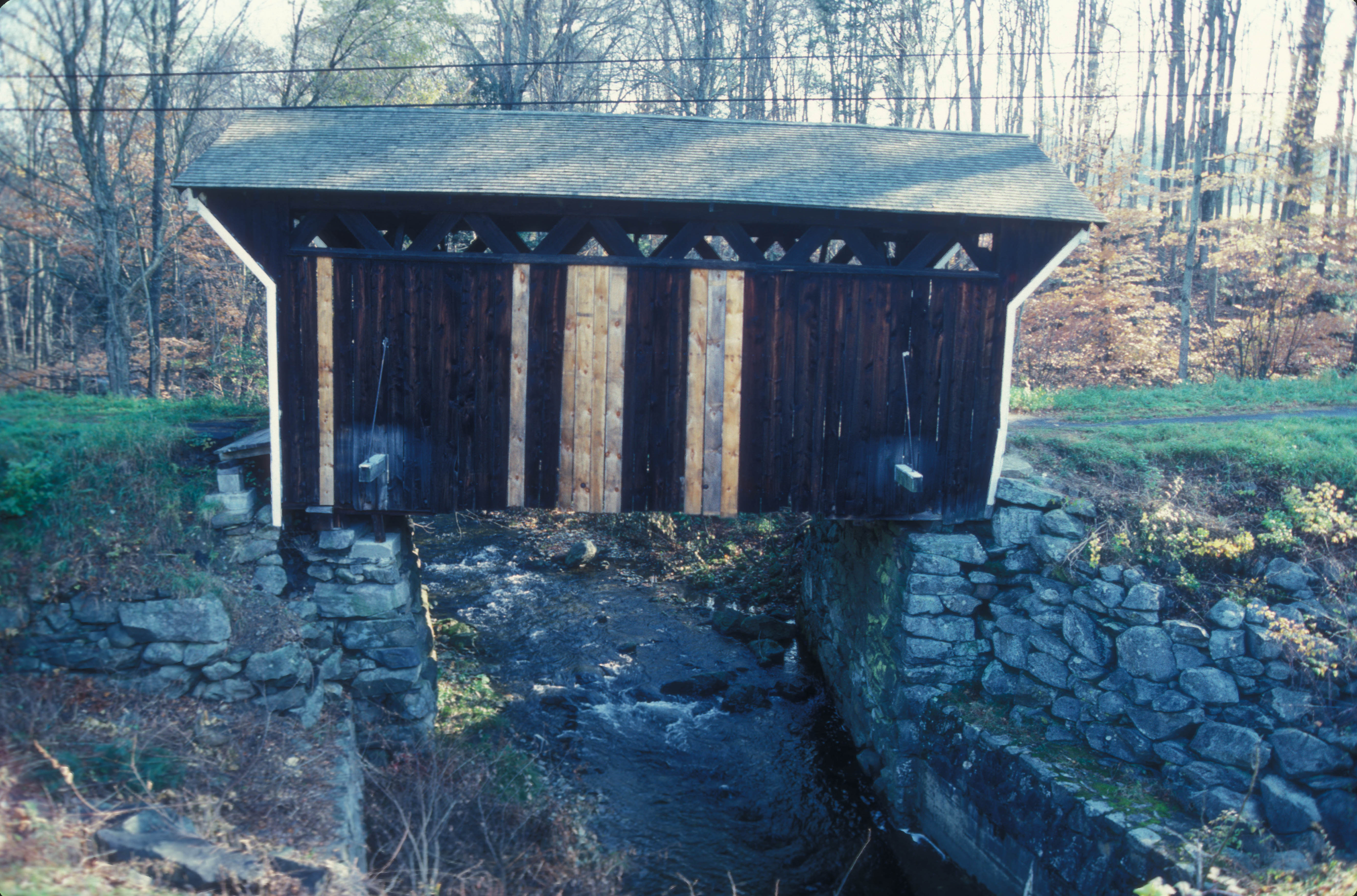

- Location within New Hampshire Location within the United States
- Location: Great Brook near Chester Turnpike, Langdon, New Hampshire
- Coordinates: 43°9′11″N 72°23′38″W
- Area: 0.3 acres (0.12 ha)
- Built: c. 1874
- Architectural style: Town lattice truss
- NRHP reference No.: 73000179
- Added to NRHP: May 24, 1973

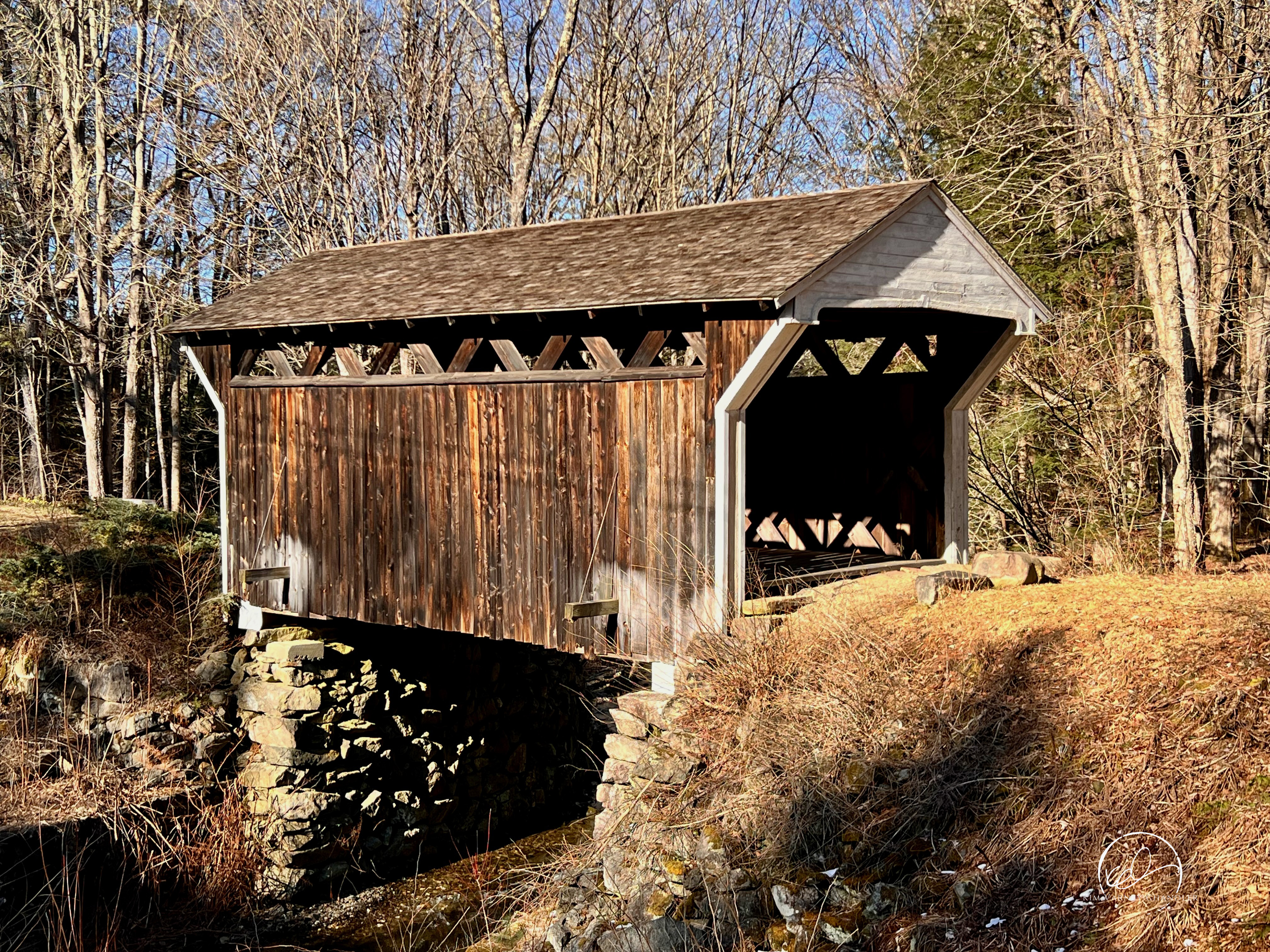
Prentiss Bridge, 2024

The Prentiss Bridge is a historic covered bridge in Langdon, New Hampshire. Built about 1874, it spans Great Brook just east of the modern alignment of Chester Turnpike, which it carried until it was bypassed by a modern bridge in 1955. At 36 feet (11 m) in length, it is the shortest 19th-century covered bridge built for use on a public roadway in New Hampshire that is still standing. The bridge was listed on the National Register of Historic Places in 1973.

== Description and history ==
The Prentiss Bridge is located in a rural setting in southern Langdon, spanning Great Brook east of Chester Turnpike, about 0.2 miles (0.32 km) south of its junction with Lower Cemetery Road. It is a Town lattice truss, 36 feet long and 15 feet (4.6 m) wide, set on stone abutments. Its exterior is finished in vertical board siding, with a ventilation gap between the siding and the gabled roof.

Bridges are known to have stood on the site since at least 1791, when the town requested a report on a bridge standing here. In 1794, the town appropriated funds to build a bridge near the mill of Jabez Rockwell and John Prentiss. In 1874, the town appropriated $1,000 to replace that structure; the present bridge was presumably built soon afterward.

Langdon's Prentiss Bridge was constructed by Albert S. Granger in 1874. The town of Langdon paid $1,062.09 for the project. Granger himself was paid $197.50 for labor, $34.97 for lumber, bolts, and spike, and $23 for the use of a derrick; nineteen other men were paid for labor and supplies.

The Prentiss Bridge was bypassed in 1955. A new, two-lane steel and concrete bridge was constructed next to the Prentiss Bridge to allow traffic to cross Great Brook without the bottleneck caused by the one-lane bridge.

Measuring thirty-five feet long, the Prentiss Bridge is the shortest historic covered bridge in New Hampshire.

== See also ==
- National Register of Historic Places listings in Sullivan County, New Hampshire
- List of New Hampshire covered bridges
- List of bridges on the National Register of Historic Places in New Hampshire
