= Great Brook =

Great Brook may refer to the following:

- Great Brook (Cold River), a tributary in New Hampshire
- Great Brook (New Jersey), a tributary of the Passaic River
