= Cold River Bridge (Langdon, New Hampshire) =

- U.S. National Register of Historic Places
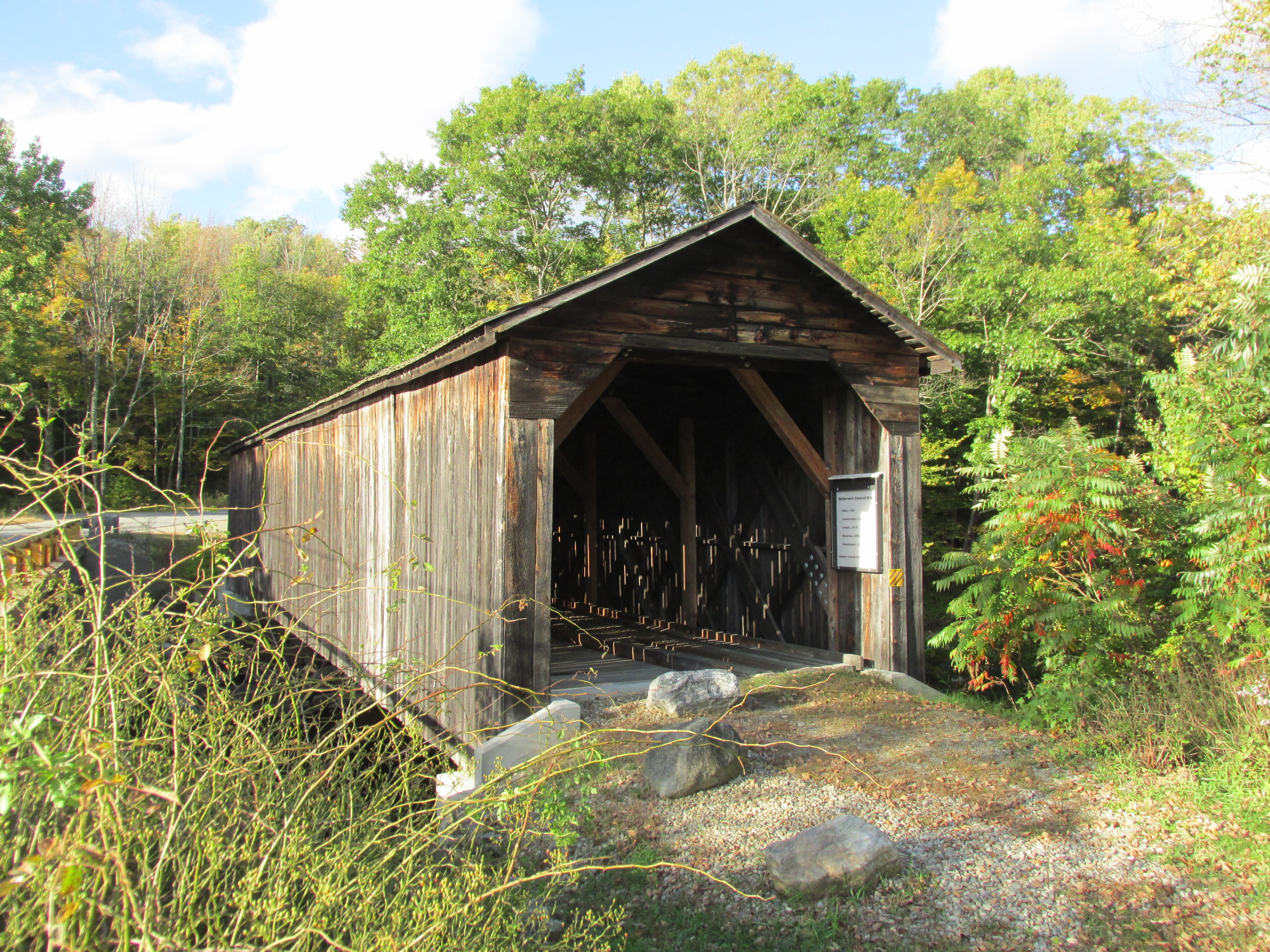
- McDermott Bridge

- Location within New Hampshire Location within the United States
- Location: Adjacent to Crane Brook Road over the Cold River, Langdon, New Hampshire
- Coordinates: 43.1697845°N 72.3456453°W
- Area: 0.1 acres (0.040 ha)
- Built: 1869
- Architect: Granger, Albert S.
- Architectural style: Modified Town lattice truss
- NRHP reference No.: 73000177
- Added to NRHP: May 17, 1973

The Cold River Bridge, also known as McDermott Bridge, is a historic wooden covered bridge spanning the Cold River near Crane Brook Road in Langdon, New Hampshire, USA. Built in 1869, it is one of the state's few surviving 19th-century covered bridges. It was listed on the National Register of Historic Places in 1973. It is closed to vehicular traffic.

== Description and history ==
The Cold River Bridge is located in a rural setting in eastern Langdon, spanning the Cold River just to the east of Crane Brook Road, which it used to carry. The bridge is 81 feet (25 m) long and 16 feet (4.9 m) wide, with a roadway width of just over 12 feet (3.7 m). It is a single-span modified Town lattice truss with a reinforcing laminated arch, set on stone abutments. It is covered by a metal roof and its sides are sheathed in vertical board siding. The portals are flanked by vertical siding, and the gable above is filled with horizontal siding. The bridge has been fastened by metal cables to the adjacent modern bridge.

The bridge is believed to be the fourth standing on this site. The town's records mention payments for construction of one bridge in 1789, with replacements in 1814 and 1840. The 1840 bridge was destroyed by a flood in October 1869. This bridge was built soon afterward, by Albert Granger for $450. It remained in use for vehicular traffic until 1964, when the town voted to build the adjacent structure.

In 2008, the McDermott Bridge was rehabilitated by Daniels Construction after significant fundraising by the Langdon Covered Bridge Association. It is now maintained by the town, and is open to foot traffic.

== See also ==
- List of New Hampshire covered bridges
- List of bridges on the National Register of Historic Places in New Hampshire
- National Register of Historic Places listings in Sullivan County, New Hampshire
