= Cold River Bridge =

Cold River Bridge may refer to:

- Cold River Bridge (Langdon, New Hampshire), listed on the National Register of Historic Places in Sullivan County, New Hampshire
- Cold River Bridge (Clarendon, Vermont), listed on the National Register of Historic Places in Rutland County, Vermont
