= Coombs Covered Bridge =

- U.S. National Register of Historic Places
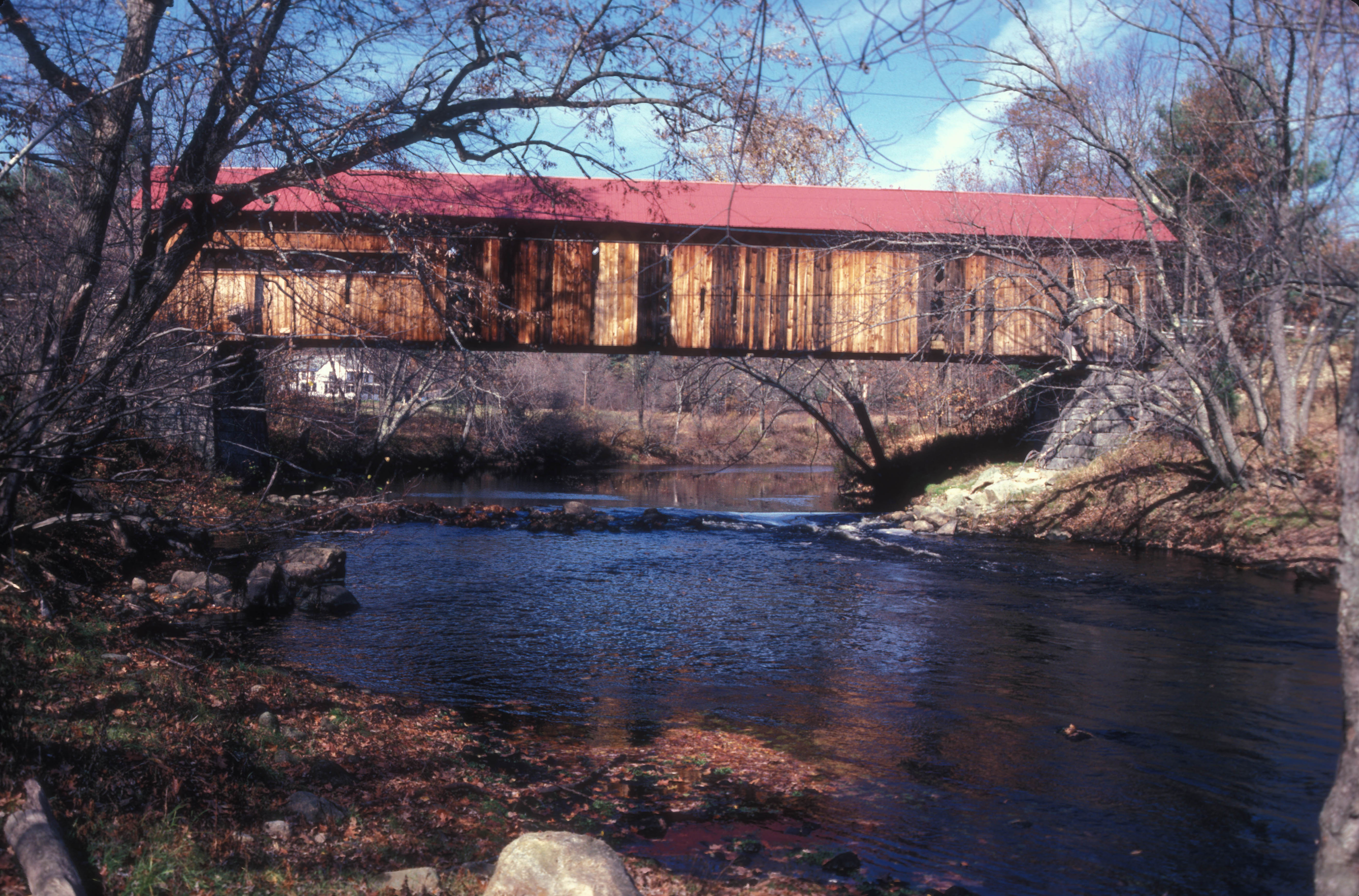

- Location within New Hampshire Location within the United States
- Location: Coombs Bridge Rd., Winchester, New Hampshire
- Coordinates: 42°50′16″N 72°21′39″W
- Area: 0.5 acres (0.20 ha)
- Built: 1837
- Architectural style: Town truss
- NRHP reference No.: 76000122
- Added to NRHP: November 21, 1976

The Coombs Covered Bridge is a wooden covered bridge which carries Coombs Bridge Road over the Ashuelot River in northern Winchester, New Hampshire. It was built in 1843, and is one of the state's small number of surviving 19th-century covered bridges. It was listed on the National Register of Historic Places in 1976.

== Description and history ==
The Coombs Covered Bridge is located roughly midway between the village centers of Winchester and Swanzey, carrying Coombs Bridge Road across the Ashuelot River between New Hampshire Route 10 and Old Swanzey Road. The bridge consists of a single span 107 feet (33 m) long and 14 feet (4.3 m) wide, with a span of just under 102 feet (31 m). It rests on unmortared stone abutments, and has a clearance over the river of about 11 feet (3.4 m). Its Town lattice trusses are sheathed in vertical board siding, and it is covered by a metal gabled roof. The end portals have segmented-arch openings, and there are banded openings on the side walls to admit light.

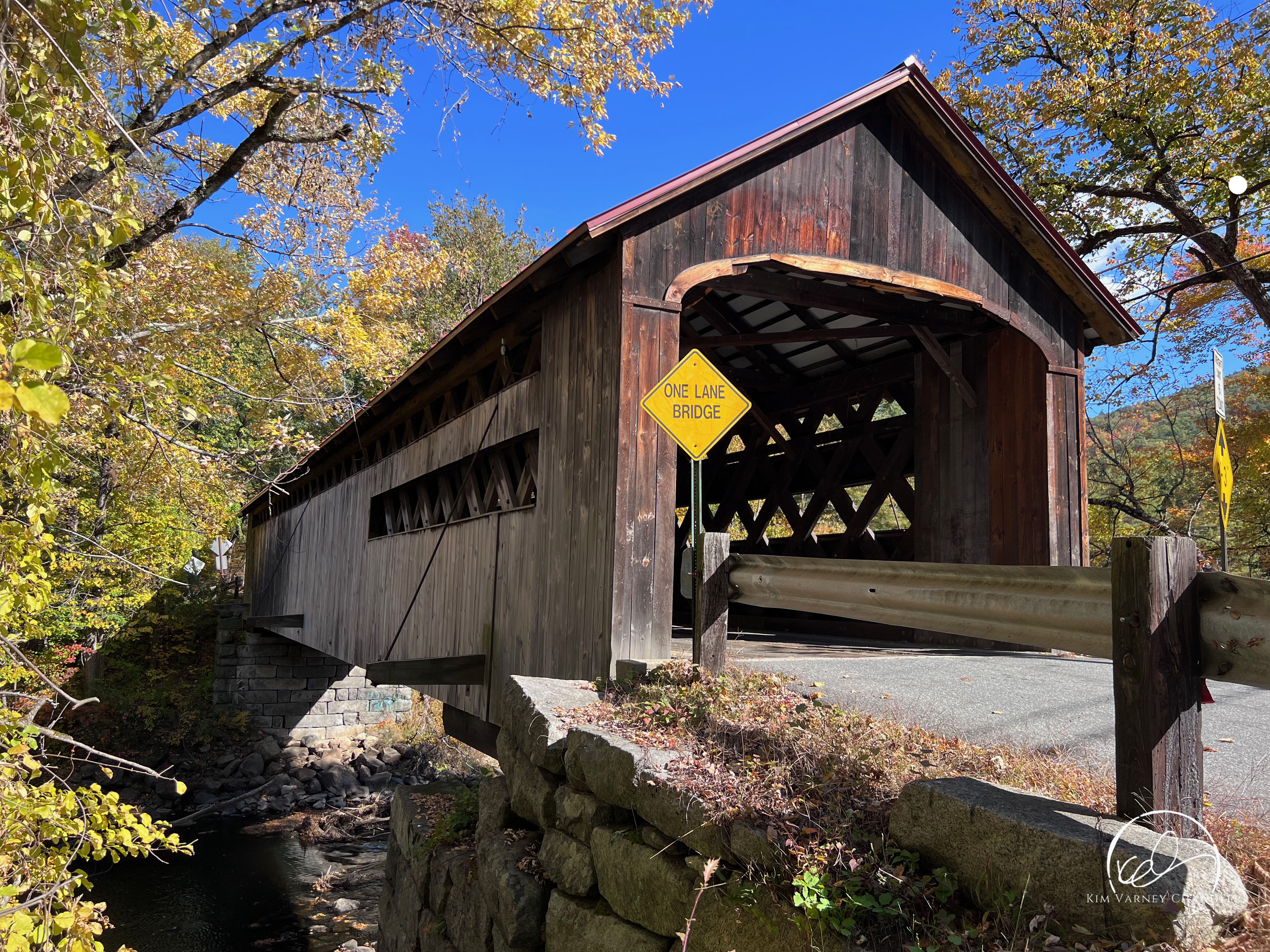
Coombs Bridge 2022

The Coombs Bridge was constructed near the homestead of farmer Anthony Coombs, Jr. and has long been maintained by the town of Winchester. The bridge had major repairs in 1971 and 1997.

== See also ==
- List of New Hampshire covered bridges
- National Register of Historic Places listings in Cheshire County, New Hampshire
- List of bridges on the National Register of Historic Places in New Hampshire
