= John Graham Brooks =

American sociologist and intellectual

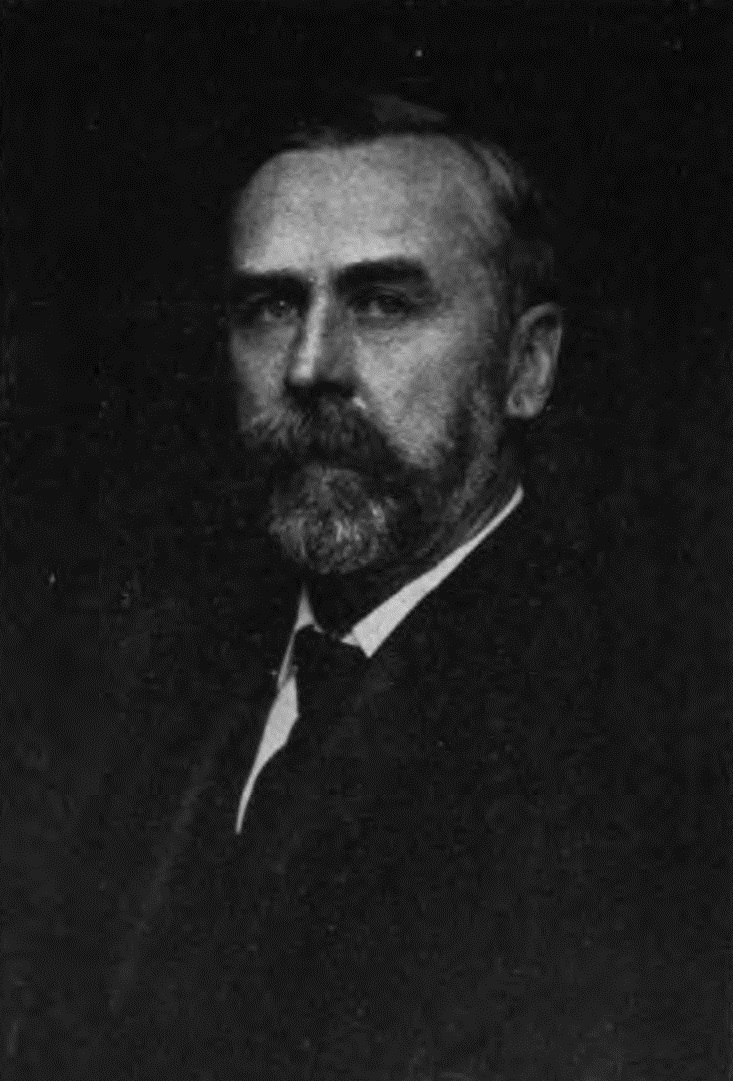

John Graham Brooks (July 19, 1846 – February 8, 1938) was an American sociologist, political reformer, and author. A former Unitarian minister, Brooks resigned from the ministry in 1891 and became an academic specialist in the field of labor relations. A lecturer and public intellectual, Brooks rejected the doctrine of socialism, instead advocating for the regulation of predatory monopolies and the initiation of progressive social reform legislation to ameliorate the most glaring problems suffered by the working class.

Brooks advanced his ideas as the author of several books which gained a broad readership among American intellectuals, including The Social Unrest (1903) and American Syndicalism (1913). Brooks' papers are housed today by Harvard University.

== Biography ==
=== Early years ===
John Graham Brooks was born in Acworth, New Hampshire, on July 19, 1846. He was the son of Chapin Kidder Brooks, a merchant and New Hampshire state legislator, and the former Pamelia Graham.

Brooks graduated from Kimball Union Academy in 1866 before briefly attending the University of Michigan Law School, from which he withdrew after a year after having second thoughts about entering the legal profession. He taught for the 1867–68 academic year at a school on Cape Cod before entering Oberlin College in Oberlin, Ohio, the following fall. He graduated from Oberlin in 1872 and enrolled at Harvard Divinity School, completing his degree in theology there in 1875.

His degree in theology in hand, Brooks was ordained as a Unitarian Universalist minister and served at a church in that capacity in Roxbury, Massachusetts. He became involved in the lives of the factory workers of the region and expounded upon the social gospel seeking amelioration of the problems suffered by the working poor. Brooks shortly gained notice for his outspoken liberal views on social matters and began public speaking on the social problems of the day.

Brooks married Helen Lawrence Appleton Washburn, the widow of another Unitarian minister, in 1880. Together the couple had three children.

=== Sociologist ===
Brooks resigned his Roxbury ministry in 1882 to begin the academic study of history and economics at several German universities. Brooks placed special emphasis upon the examination of the conditions of the working class during his graduate studies, which were completed in 1885. Following his academic stint in Germany, Brooks and his family lived briefly in London, where he lectured and preached on topics of concern. He returned to the United States later in 1885 to once again enter the ministry, accepting a position at a church in the manufacturing city of Brockton, Massachusetts, and lecturing at Harvard on the topic of socialism.

It was at this time that Brooks began to write for a larger audience, publishing articles in the liberal national weeklies The Forum and The Nation.

Brooks left the church permanently in 1891 to take a post as an investigator of the conditions of workers for the U.S. Department of Labor. He was dispatched to Germany to study the cutting edge system of social insurance in place there, a trip which resulted in the publication of his first book in 1895. During this period Brooks traveled as a government investigator of strikes and lockouts and lectured on various topics relating to progressive social reform, including trade unions, cooperatives, and the settlement house movement. This experience of travel and investigation and lecture preparation and discussion ultimately lead to a second book, The Social Unrest: Studies in Labor and Socialist Movements (1903), this time published by a commercial publishing house, Macmillan.

In this book Brooks turned away from his earlier belief in socialism in favor of advocacy of cooperation between capital and labor on the basis of collective bargaining, along with the regulation of the excesses of monopolies and the initiation of social welfare programs. He further developed this new theme of cooperation rather than class struggle with a third book published in 1908, As Others See Us. He added a fourth book, a biography of philanthropist William Henry Baldwin, Jr., in 1910.

In 1911, Brooks lectured at the University of California, Berkeley, on the Industrial Workers of the World — a controversial anti-political syndicalist trade union then experiencing its greatest organizational growth. Rather than seeking to denigrate this group, regarded by many Californians and virtually the whole of its political class with fear and loathing, Brooks took a painstaking historical approach to the organization. The result of his studies was another book, American Syndicalism: The IWW, published by Macmillan in 1913.

=== Later years, death, and legacy ===
Brooks retired in 1920, shortly after the publication of his sixth and final book, Labor's Challenge to the Social Order. He continued to lecture periodically and was honored with a banquet under the auspices of the National Consumer's League in 1925, an event addressed by his peers John R. Commons and Florence Kelley and the future United States Supreme Court Justice Felix Frankfurter.

John Graham Brooks died on February 8, 1938, in Cambridge, Massachusetts. He was 91 years old at the time of his death.

Brooks was elected president of the American Social Science Association in 1904, serving in that capacity through the next year, and headed the National Consumers' League as that organization's first president from 1899 to 1915.

== Works ==
- Compulsory Insurance in Germany: Including an Appendix Relating to Compulsory Insurance in Other Countries in Europe. Washington, DC: Government Printing Office, 1895.
- The Social Unrest: Studies in Labor and Socialist Movements. New York: Macmillan, 1903.
- As Others See Us: A Study of Progress in the United States. New York: Macmillan, 1908.
- An American Citizen: The Life of William Henry Baldwin, Jr. Boston: Houghton Mifflin, 1910.
- American Syndicalism: The IWW. New York: Macmillan, 1913.
- Labor's Challenge to the Social Order: Democracy Its Own Critic and Educator. New York: Macmillan, 1920.
