= Corbin Covered Bridge =

- Formerly listed on the U.S. National Register of Historic Places
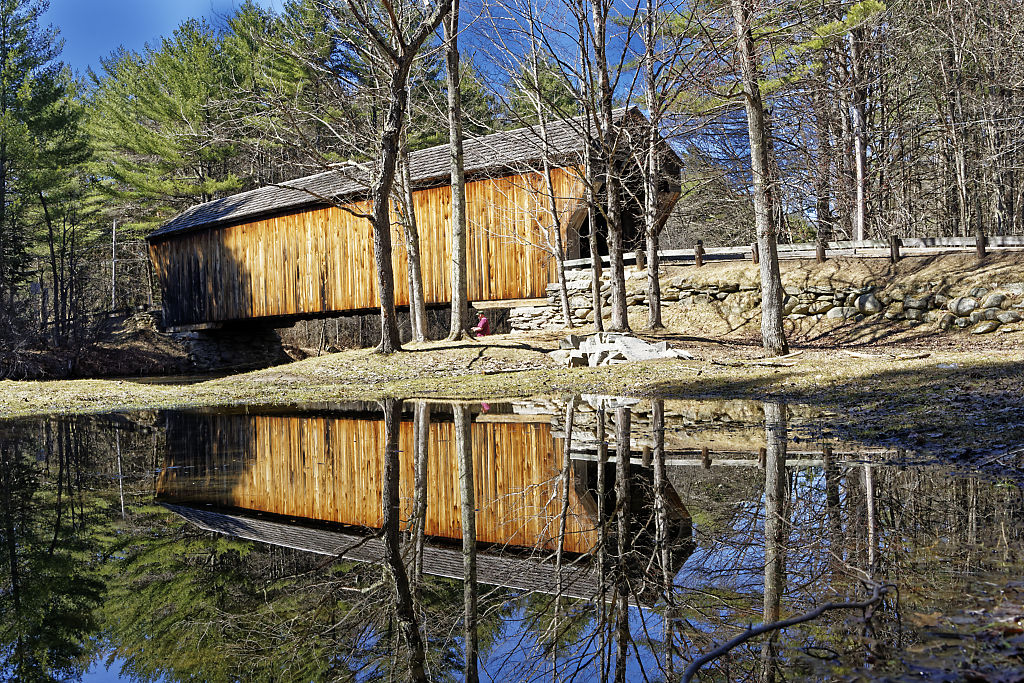
- The bridge in April 2019

- Location within New Hampshire Location within the United States
- Location: Corbin Rd., Newport, New Hampshire
- Coordinates: 43°23′28″N 72°11′43.5″W
- Built: 1845
- Architectural style: Town lattice truss
- NRHP reference No.: 76000134

Significant dates
- Added to NRHP: December 12, 1976
- Removed from NRHP: September 2, 1993

The Corbin Covered Bridge is a wooden covered bridge over the North Branch of the Sugar River on Corbin Road, approximately 1 mile (1.6 km) west of NH 10 in Newport in Sullivan County, New Hampshire, United States. The bridge was listed on the National Register of Historic Places in 1976, but was removed following its destruction by fire in the early hours of May 25, 1993. It has since been reconstructed.

== Description ==
The structure is a Town lattice truss bridge, originally built in 1845, destroyed by fire in 1993 and subsequently reconstructed, consisting of one span with a total length of 96 feet (29 m). The total width of the bridge is 18 feet (5.5 m), and has a single lane road. The bridge rests on stone abutments. The bridge passes 12 feet (3.7 m) over the water. Its sides are sheathed, the usual means by which the truss elements are protected from the elements.

== See also ==
- List of New Hampshire covered bridges
- List of bridges on the National Register of Historic Places in New Hampshire
- National Register of Historic Places listings in Sullivan County, New Hampshire
