= South Acworth, New Hampshire =

Unincorporated community in New Hampshire, United States

- Unincorporated community
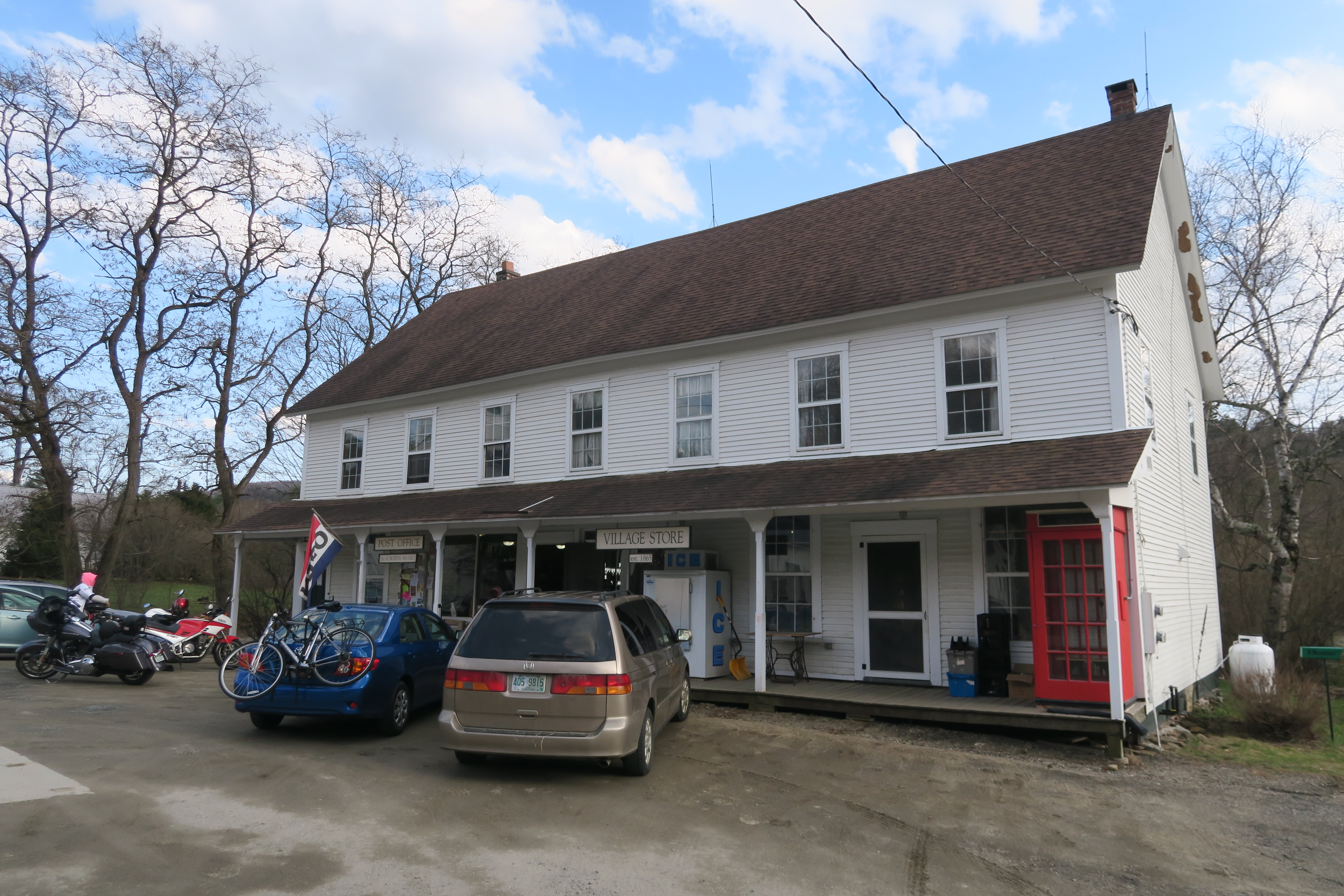
- Village Store

- Location within New Hampshire Location within the United States
- Coordinates: 43°11′27″N 72°17′07″W
- Country: United States
- State: New Hampshire
- County: Sullivan
- Town: Acworth
- Elevation: 830 ft (250 m)
- Time zone: UTC-5 (Eastern (EST))
  - Summer (DST): UTC-4 (EDT)
- ZIP code: 03607
- Area code: 603
- GNIS feature ID: 870014

South Acworth is an unincorporated community in the town of Acworth in Sullivan County, New Hampshire, United States. It is located around a dam on the Cold River, 2 miles (3 km) south of and 700 feet (210 m) downhill from the Acworth town center. New Hampshire Route 123A passes through the village, heading east to New Hampshire Route 10 in the town of Marlow and west to Alstead.

South Acworth has a separate ZIP code (03607) from the rest of Acworth.
