= Bascom Maple Farms =

Coordinates: 43°12′27″N 72°19′56″W

Bascom Maple Farms, Inc.
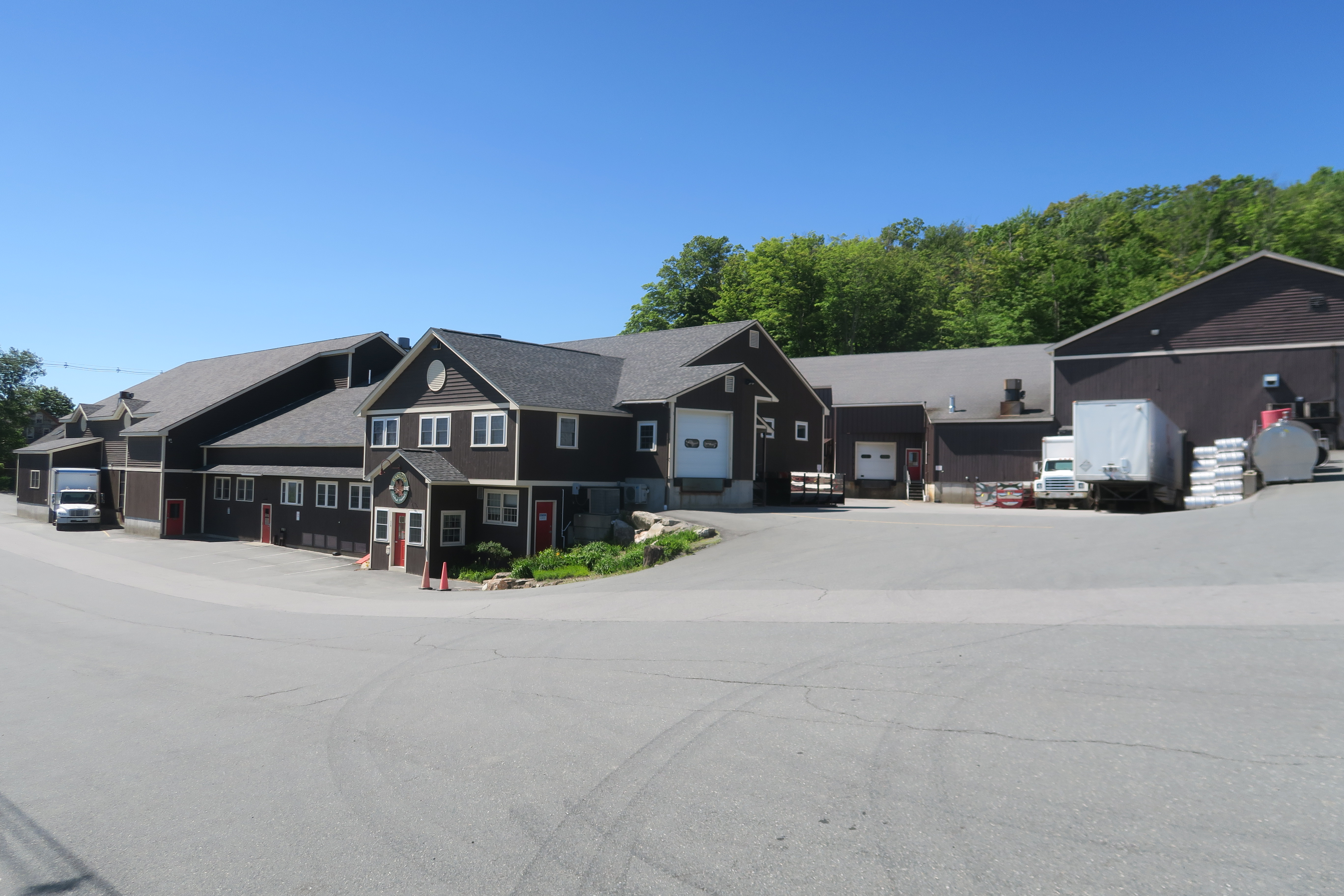
- Company type: Private
- Industry: Maple products
- Founded: 1853
- Headquarters: Bascom Maple Farm, Acworth, New Hampshire (mailing address: Alstead, New Hampshire), United States
- Key people: Bruce Bascom (President); David Bascom (Vice President); Kevin Bascom (Vice President)
- Products: Maple syrup Maple sugar Sugaring equipment
- Website: www.bascommaple.com

Bascom Maple Farms, Inc., is a privately held company based at the Bascom Maple Farm in Acworth, New Hampshire, with a mailing address of Alstead, New Hampshire. Officers of the company include President Bruce Bascom and Vice-Presidents David Bascom and Kevin Bascom.

The company is one of the largest independent maple wholesalers in the United States, as well as the country's largest distributor of new and used sugaring equipment to maple farmers and sugar houses. Bascom Maple Farms is one of the top four maple syrup processors in the United States and also buys, produces, bottles and sells pure maple syrup and maple sugar.

The Bascom family began producing maple syrup in 1853 and has operated commercial syrup production and maple packing facilities for over 40 years. Its division Bascom Family Farms is the largest independent supplier of pure and organic maple syrup and maple sugar products.

Kenneth Bascom, who was instrumental in bringing the Bascom Farm maple products to the forefront of the industry, was inducted into the American Maple Hall of Fame in 1994. In 2010, Bruce Bascom was also honored by the North American Maple Syrup Council with induction into the Maple Hall of Fame, headquartered at the International Maple Museum Centre in Croghan, New York. Kenneth Bascom and his son Bruce are one of only three father-son inductions honored in the Maple Hall of Fame.

Author Douglas Whynott records some of Bascom Maple Farms' history in his 2014 book The Sugar Season.
