= Rowell's Covered Bridge =

- U.S. National Register of Historic Places
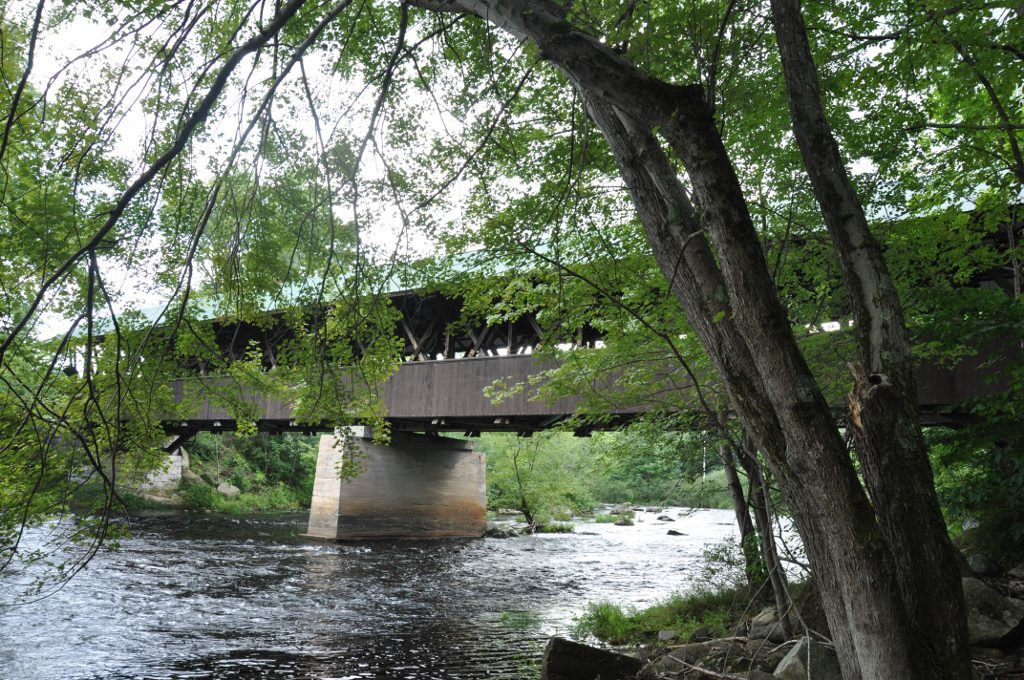

- Location within New Hampshire Location within the United States
- Location: Rowell Bridge Rd., West Hopkinton, New Hampshire
- Coordinates: 43.19261°N 71.74874°W
- Area: 1 acre (0.40 ha)
- Built: 1852
- Architect: Stephen H. Long; Horace Childs
- Architectural style: Long patent truss; Burr arch
- NRHP reference No.: 76000129
- Added to NRHP: November 21, 1976

Rowell's Covered Bridge is a covered bridge in West Hopkinton, New Hampshire, which carries Rowell Bridge Road over the Contoocook River. The Long truss bridge was completed in 1853, and is one of New Hampshire's few surviving 19th-century covered bridges. It was listed on the National Register of Historic Places in 1976. It is named for Abram (or Abraham) Rowell, an early resident of the area.

== Description and history ==
Rowell's Covered Bridge is in a rural setting in western Hopkinton, crossing the Contoocook River a short way north of the Contoocook River Dam. The bridge is just under 20 feet (6.1 m) wide and 167 feet (51 m) long, and consists of a single span supported by two modified Long trusses resting on granite abutments. The trusses are distinctive in the addition of several arches, which consist of solid timbers that were spliced or butted together, and mortised into other truss members. The bridge's sturdy engineering was demonstrated by the addition of a central pier in the 20th century whose intent was to add strength. The pier, however, acted as a fulcrum, causing the bridge to seesaw under load and weakening its joints. The top of this pier was consequently removed, leaving the bridge largely as designed except for the addition of some metal reinforcing tie rods.

The bridge is the third to stand at this site, the oldest known to be standing here in 1793. That bridge was replaced in 1845, but was washed away by flooding in 1852. The present bridge was built in 1853 by Horace Childs. Its design is a variant of a design patented by West Hopkinton native Stephen H. Long, a civil engineer. Long helped further Childs' career as a bridge builder; Childs is known to have built covered bridges all over New England and trained a following generation of builders. The bridge underwent a major restoration in 1965.

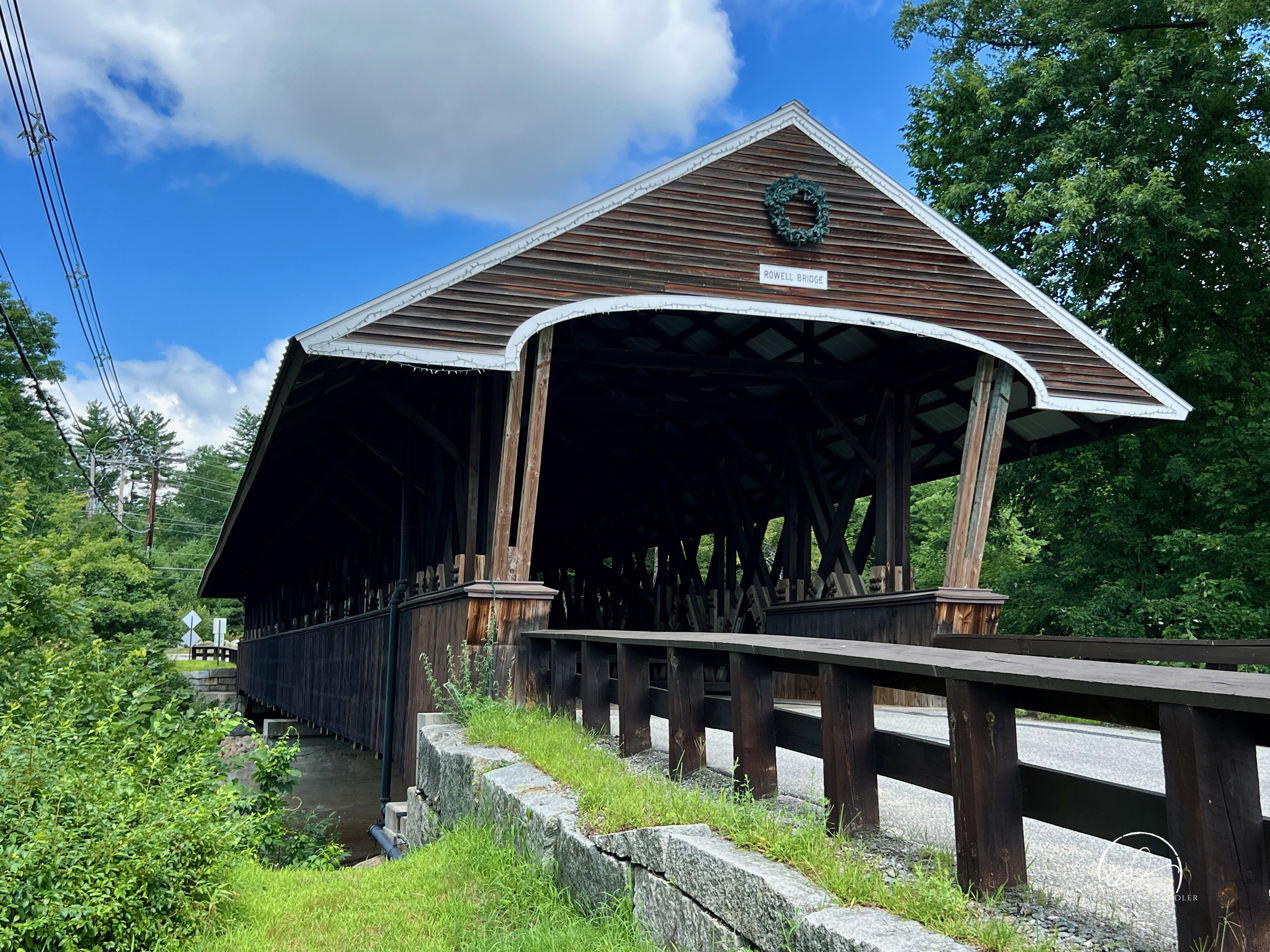
Rowell Bridge, August 2024

== See also ==
- List of bridges on the National Register of Historic Places in New Hampshire
- List of New Hampshire covered bridges
- National Register of Historic Places listings in Merrimack County, New Hampshire
