= Pittsburg–Clarksville Covered Bridge =

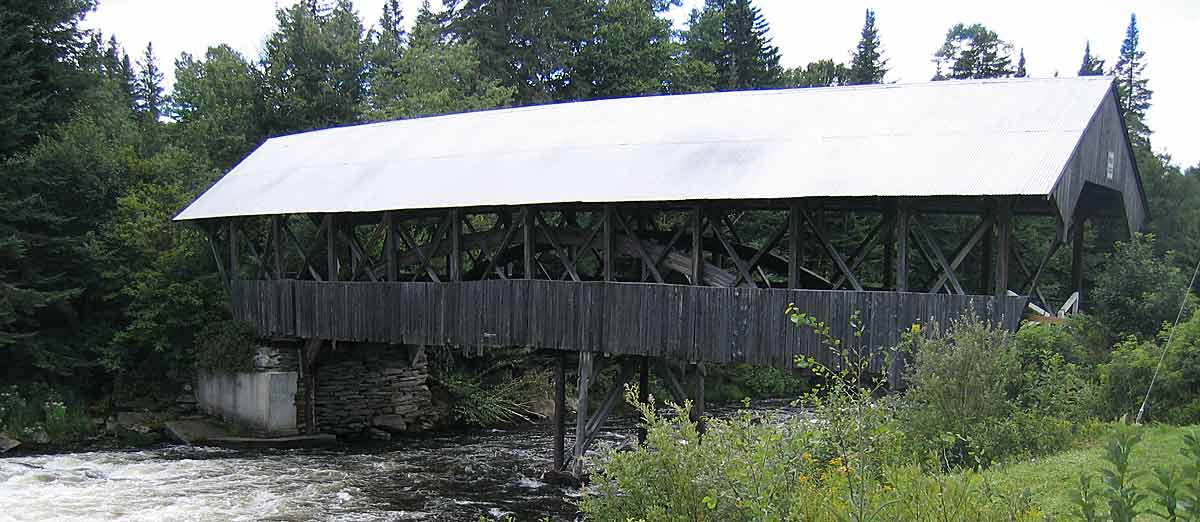
- Coordinates: 45°03′16″N 71°24′25″W
- Crosses: Connecticut River
- Locale: Pittsburg, New Hampshire to Clarksville, New Hampshire
- Maintained by: towns of Pittsburg and Clarksville
- ID number: 29-04-03 (NH #34)

Characteristics
- Design: Paddleford truss with added arches
- Total length: 88.5 ft (27.0 m)
- Width: 19.25 ft (5.9 m) (maximum); 15 ft (4.6 m) (roadway)
- Longest span: 70 ft (21.3 m)
- Clearance above: 12.83 ft (3.911 m)

History
- Construction end: around 1876
- Closed: 1981

Location
- Interactive map of Pittsburg–Clarksville Covered Bridge

The Pittsburg–Clarksville Covered Bridge (also known as the Bacon Road Bridge) is a wooden Paddleford truss bridge with added arches over the Connecticut River located between Pittsburg and Clarksville, New Hampshire. It was closed to traffic in 1981. The bridge is the northernmost covered bridge crossing the Connecticut River.

== History ==
Built around 1876, the Pittsburg-Clarksville Covered Bridge spans the Connecticut River between Pittsburg and Clarksville. Also known as the Bacon Bridge, Fletcher Mill Bridge, and Lower Village Bridge, the 89-foot Paddleford truss with arches was built near Ebenezer Fletcher’s mill. The bridge received major repairs in 1974 through the State Bridge Aid Program at a cost of $6,700, including work on the abutments, trusses, decking, portals, and guardrails. It was closed to vehicular traffic in 1981 and remains the northernmost covered bridge spanning the Connecticut River.

== See also ==
- List of crossings of the Connecticut River
- List of covered bridges in New Hampshire
