= Carleton Bridge =

- U.S. National Register of Historic Places
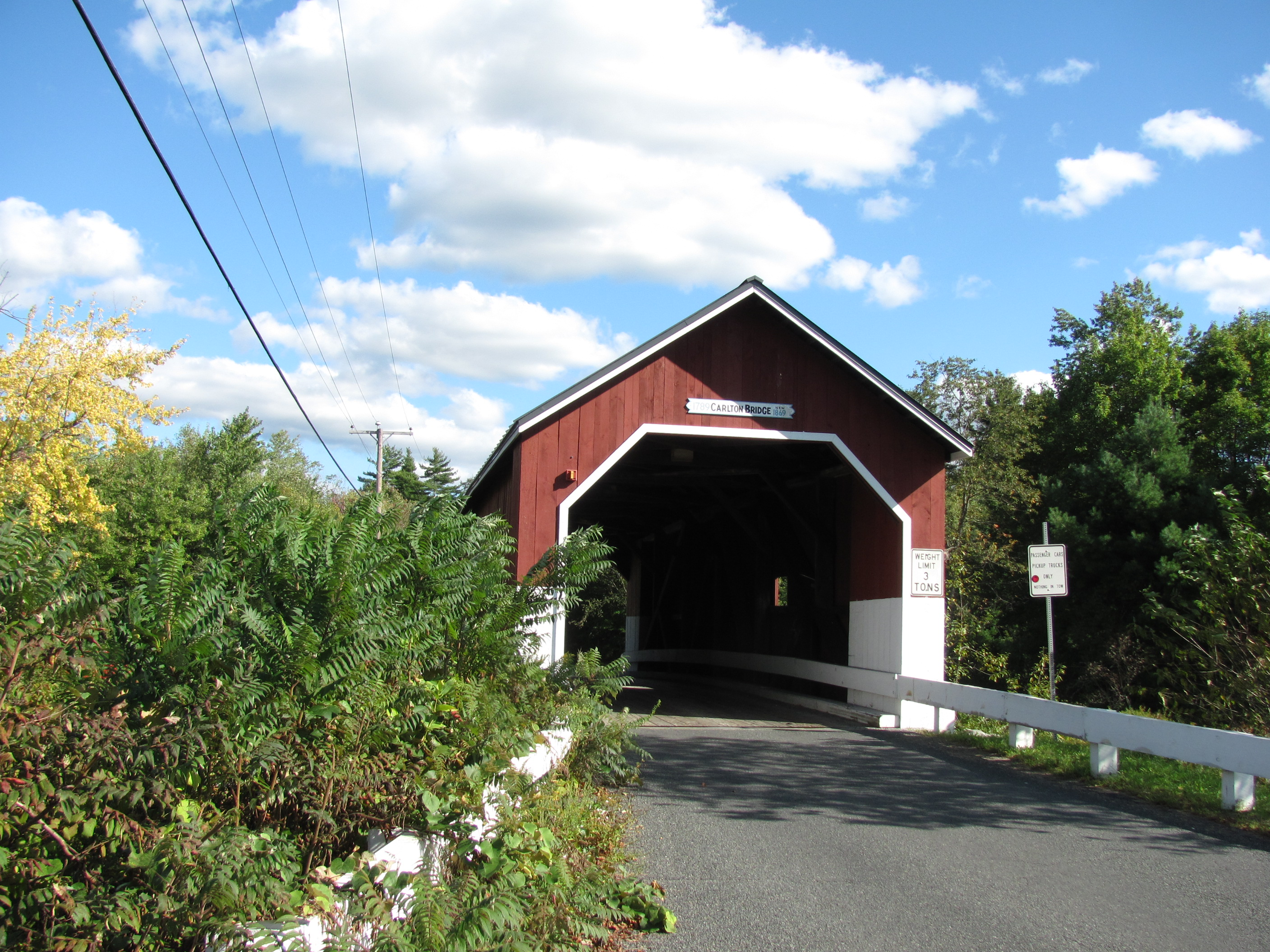
- Carleton Bridge

- Location within New Hampshire Location within the United States
- Nearest city: East Swanzey, New Hampshire
- Coordinates: 42°51′17″N 72°16′28″W
- Area: less than one acre
- Architectural style: Queenpost Truss
- NRHP reference No.: 75000121
- Added to NRHP: June 10, 1975

The Carlton Bridge (or Carleton Bridge) (Note: The sign on the bridge itself, visible in numerous online photos, reads "Carlton Bridge".) is a historic wooden covered bridge that carries Carlton Road over the South Branch Ashuelot River in East Swanzey, New Hampshire. The bridge was built in 1869, and is the region's only surviving example of a 19th-century Queenspost truss bridge. The bridge was listed on the National Register of Historic Places in 1975.

== Description and history ==
The Carlton Bridge is located in central eastern Swanzey, in a rural setting on Carlton Road east of New Hampshire Route 32. Carlton Road is one of the main routes connecting Swanzey village with East Swanzey. The bridge is a single span 67 feet 3 inches (20.50 m) in length and 16 feet 6 inches (5.03 m) wide, resting on granite abutments. Its roadway is 12 feet 4 inches (3.76 m) wide, sufficient for one lane of traffic. Its exterior is sheathed in vertical board siding and is topped by a gabled roof. Its trusses have been reinforced with iron tie rods and other metal elements.

The bridge was built in 1869 on a site that is believed to have had a bridge since 1789. It is believed to be the only example of a Queenspost truss bridge in southern New Hampshire. This truss method is quite old, and is based on techniques used for building large structures such as churches and barns.

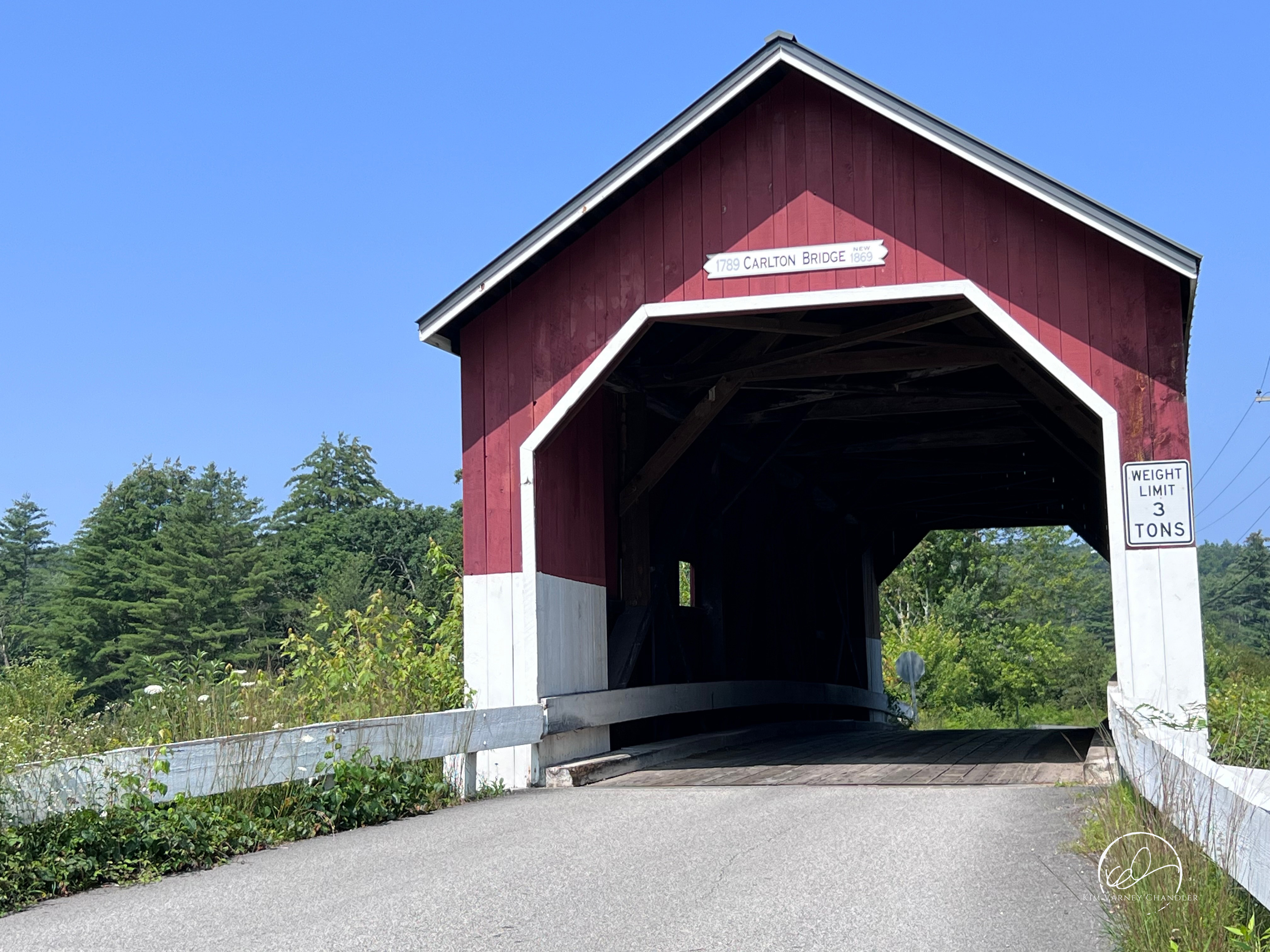
Carlton Bridge, 2023

The Carlton Bridge was repaired in 1997 by Wright Construction Co., Inc. of Mount Holly, Vermont. Work began with dismantling the bridge to provide access to the bottom chord; reusable pieces were stored in a nearby field. Crews replaced rotted wood throughout the bridge, including the trusses, floorboards, and rails. The repairs cost $414,025, with the State Bridge Aid Program covering 80 percent. The Carlton Bridge reopened on October 4, 1997.

== See also ==
- List of New Hampshire covered bridges
- List of bridges on the National Register of Historic Places in New Hampshire
- National Register of Historic Places listings in Cheshire County, New Hampshire
