= Acworth, New Hampshire =

- Town
- Location in Sullivan County and the state of New Hampshire.
- Coordinates: 43°13′0″N 72°17′12″W
- Country: United States
- State: New Hampshire
- County: Sullivan
- Incorporated: 1772
- Villages: Acworth; East Acworth; South Acworth

Area
  - Total: 39.1 sq mi (101.2 km^{2})
  - Land: 38.8 sq mi (100.5 km^{2})
  - Water: 0.27 sq mi (0.7 km^{2}) 0.65%
- Elevation: 1,303 ft (397 m)

Population (2020)
  - Total: 853
  - Density: 22/sq mi (8.5/km^{2})
- Time zone: UTC-5 (Eastern)
  - Summer (DST): UTC-4 (Eastern)
- ZIP codes: 03601 (Acworth); 03602 (Alstead); 03607 (South Acworth); 03773 (Newport)
- Area code: 603
- FIPS code: 33-00260
- GNIS feature ID: 873525
- Website: acworthnh.net

Acworth is a town in Sullivan County, New Hampshire, United States. At the 2020 census, the town had a total population of 853.

== History ==
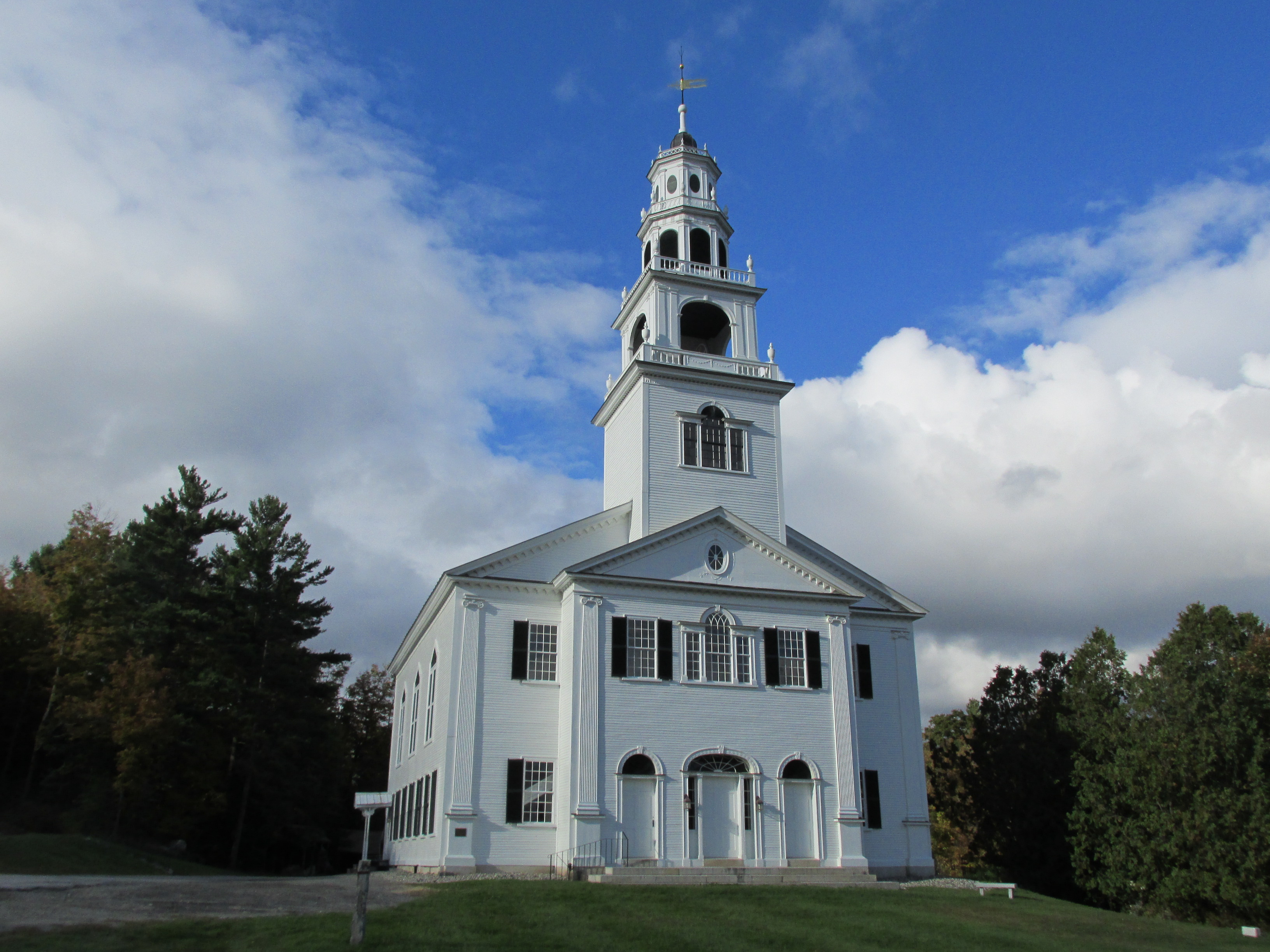
Acworth Congregational Church on the town common

Originally chartered by colonial governor Benning Wentworth in 1752, it was called "Burnet" after William Burnet, a former governor of the Province of Massachusetts Bay. In 1754, however, the French and Indian War broke out, and no settlements were made under the charter. Wentworth regranted the township on September 19, 1766, naming it after Sir Jacob Acworth, a former Surveyor of the Royal Navy. The town was first permanently settled in 1768 by several families from Londonderry, New Hampshire.

Acworth was incorporated in 1772 by Governor John Wentworth, but war again slowed its development. With the close of the Revolution, however, Acworth grew quickly. By 1859, it had 1,251 inhabitants, most of whom were occupied in agriculture. The Cold River provided water power for industry, including five sawmills, a gristmill, a woolen factory, a bobbin factory and a peg factory. There was also a boot and shoe manufacturer. Acworth is a source for museum-quality crystals such as beryl. The town of Acworth, Georgia, was named for this town, because this was the hometown of a railroad engineer there.

== Geography ==
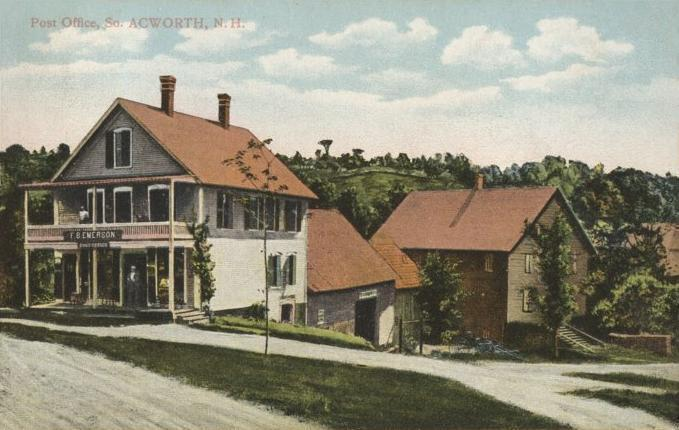
Post office in 1907

According to the United States Census Bureau, the town has a total area of 39.1 square miles (101.2 km^{2}), of which 38.8 square miles (100.5 km^{2}) are land and 0.2 square miles (0.6 km^{2}) are water, comprising 0.65% of the town. Acworth is drained by the Cold River and its tributaries, except for the northwest corner of town, which drains north to the Little Sugar River. The town lies fully within the Connecticut River watershed. The highest point in Acworth is Gove Hill in the northeast part of town, at 1,939 feet (591 m) above sea level.

The town is crossed by one numbered state highway, New Hampshire Route 123A, which follows the Cold River and passes through the village of South Acworth. Although not numbered routes, the state also maintains a handful of other roads in the town, including Cold River Road, Hill Road, and a portion of Charlestown Road.

=== Adjacent municipalities ===
- Unity (north)
- Lempster (east)
- Marlow (southeast)
- Alstead (south)
- Langdon (southwest)
- Charlestown (northwest)

== Demographics ==
Historical population
Census	Pop.	Note	%±
1790	704		—
1800	1,376		95.5%
1810	1,523		10.7%
1820	1,479		−2.9%
1830	1,401		−5.3%
1840	1,450		3.5%
1850	1,251		−13.7%
1860	1,180		−5.7%
1870	1,050		−11.0%
1880	982		−6.5%
1890	717		−27.0%
1900	594		−17.2%
1910	536		−9.8%
1920	436		−18.7%
1930	471		8.0%
1940	477		1.3%
1950	418		−12.4%
1960	371		−11.2%
1970	459		23.7%
1980	590		28.5%
1990	776		31.5%
2000	836		7.7%
2010	891		6.6%
2020	853		−4.3%
U.S. Decennial Census

As of the census of 2020, there were 853 people and 264 households residing in the town. The population density was 21.8 people per square mile (8.3/km^{2}). There were approximately 521 housing units at an average density of 13.3 per square mile (5.1/km^{2}). The racial makeup of the town was 90.06% White, 1.29% African American, 0.82% Native American, 0.94% Asian, and 4.92% from two or more races. Hispanic or Latino of any race were 2.23% of the population.

There were 264 households, out of which 25.9% had children under the age of 18 living with them, 56.1% were married couples living together, 18.2% had a female householder with no husband present, and 26.4% were non-families. 8.68% of all households were made up of individuals, and 4.22% had someone living alone who was 65 years of age or older. The average household size was 3.23 and the average family size was 4.13.

In the town, the population was spread out, with 25.8% under the age of 18, 2.3% from 18 to 24, 20.4% from 25 to 44, 5.3% from 45 to 64, and 21.8% who were 65 years of age or older. The median age was 46.4 years. The sex ration (males per 100 females) was 73.6.

The median income for a household in the town was $80,000, and the median income for a family was $81,477. The per capita income for the town was $24,760. About 8.1% of the population was below the poverty line, including 1.8% of those under age 18 and 10.8% of those age 65 or over.

== Notable people ==
- George W. Anderson (1861–1938), federal judge
- Nedom L. Angier (1814–1882), mayor of Atlanta; Georgia state treasurer
- John Graham Brooks (1846–1938), sociologist, political reformer
- Thomas J. Cram (1804–1883), engineer with the U.S. Corps of Topographical Engineers
- Adrian Dubois (born 1987), professional soccer player
- Alice B. Fogel, New Hampshire Poet Laureate, 2014–2019
- Perley Keyes (1774–1834), member of the New York Senate
- Talcott Parsons (1902–1979), Harvard sociologist
- Judith Rossner (1935–2005), novelist
- Fritz Wetherbee (born 1936), television host and journalist
- Hiram Wilson (1803–1864), abolitionist
- Joseph Gardner Wilson (1826–1873), Oregon supreme court justice and US congressman
- Urban A. Woodbury (1838–1915), Civil War veteran and the 45th governor of Vermont

== See also ==
- Bascom Maple Farms
