= County Farm Bridge (Dover, New Hampshire) =

- U.S. National Register of Historic Places
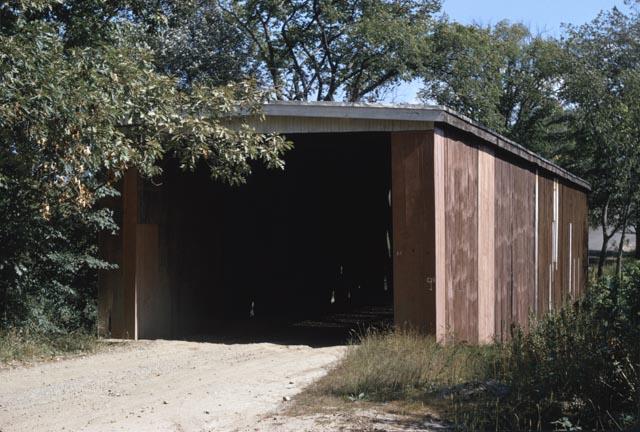
- County Farm Bridge, 1966

- Location within New Hampshire Location within the United States
- Location: end of County Farm Rd., Dover, New Hampshire
- Coordinates: 43°13′14″N 70°56′38″W
- Area: 0.1 acres (0.040 ha)
- Built: 1875
- Architectural style: Howe Truss
- NRHP reference No.: 75000237
- Added to NRHP: May 21, 1975

The County Farm Bridge was a historic covered bridge spanning the Cocheco River in Dover, New Hampshire. A Howe truss bridge, it was built about 1875 to serve the adjacent county farm complex, and was destroyed by fire in 1981. It was listed on the National Register of Historic Places in 1975. The bridge site now has a pedestrian bridge.

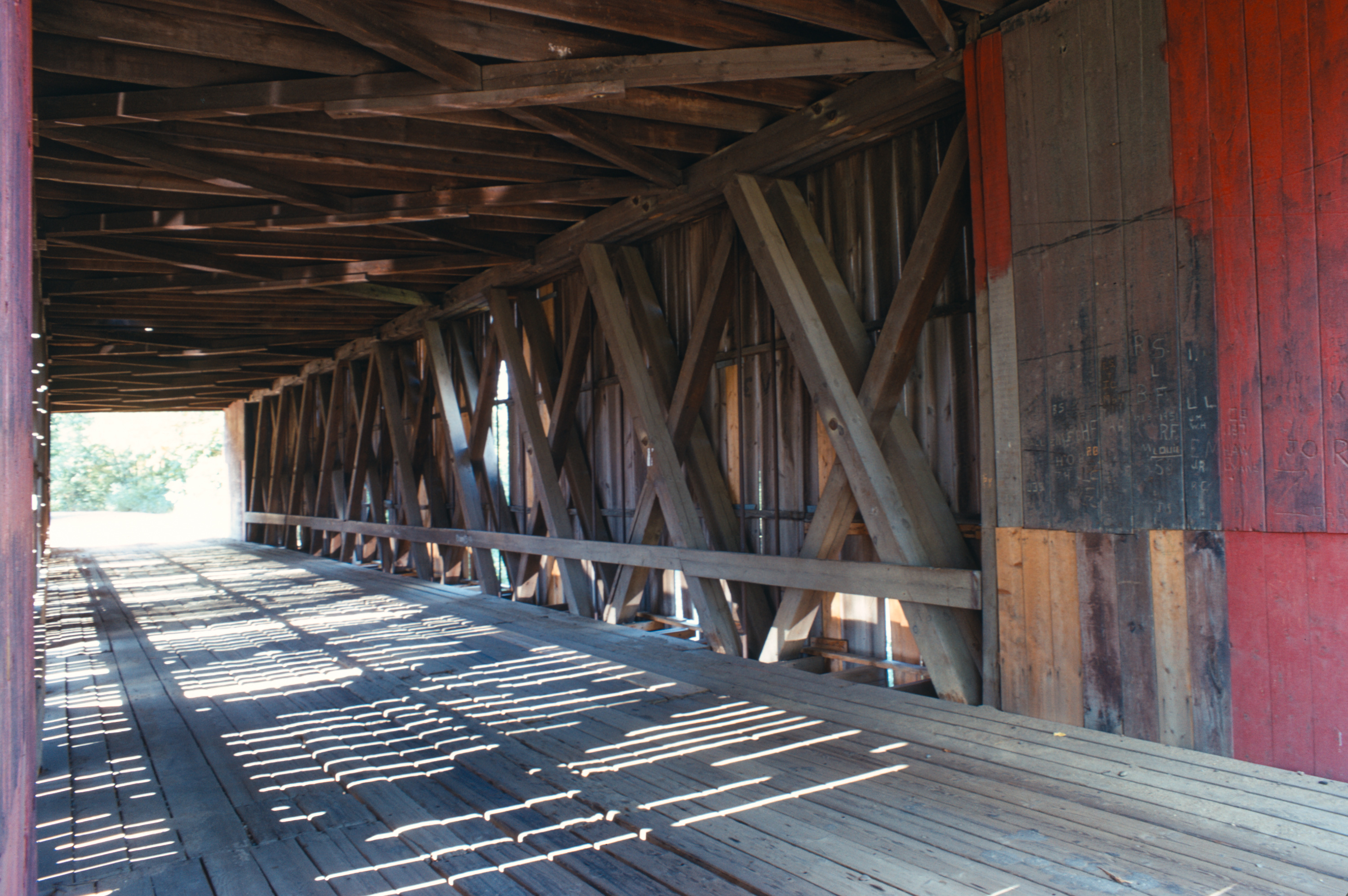
County Farm Bridge, Inside, 1966

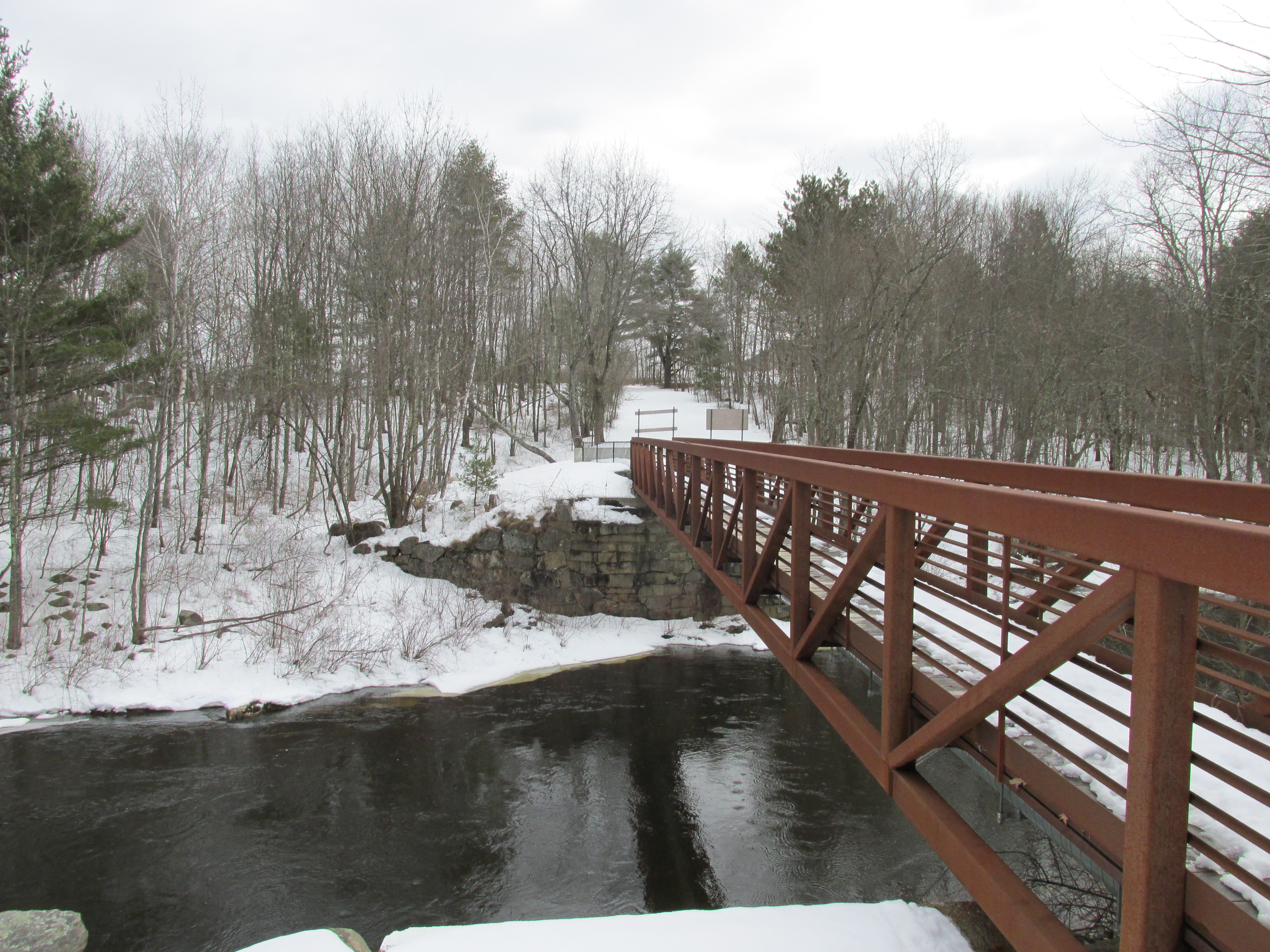
Replacement bridge showing original abutment, 2013

== Description and history ==
The County Farm Bridge location is in a rural setting in western Dover. It directly abuts the large county complex, housing the county prison, a courthouse, and other facilities. The bridge site is northwest of the complex, oriented in a northwest-southeast direction across the Cocheco River, which meanders south and then east around the county complex. The bridge was a single-span Howe truss structure, set on stone abutments. It was 112.5 feet (34.3 m) long, and had an unusually low pitched roof. Its exterior was clad in vertical board siding.

The bridge was built about 1875, and was the first to be built on that site. It was apparently built to serve the county complex, which had been established in 1866. In 1963 the bridge abutments were augmented by a system of concrete piers and steel beams. Ownership of the bridge was transferred from the county to the city in 1972. The bridge burned in 1981, and has since then been replaced by a multi-use pedestrian structure.

== See also ==
- National Register of Historic Places listings in Strafford County, New Hampshire
- List of bridges on the National Register of Historic Places in New Hampshire
- List of New Hampshire covered bridges
