= New Henniker Bridge =

New Henniker Bridge New Bridge
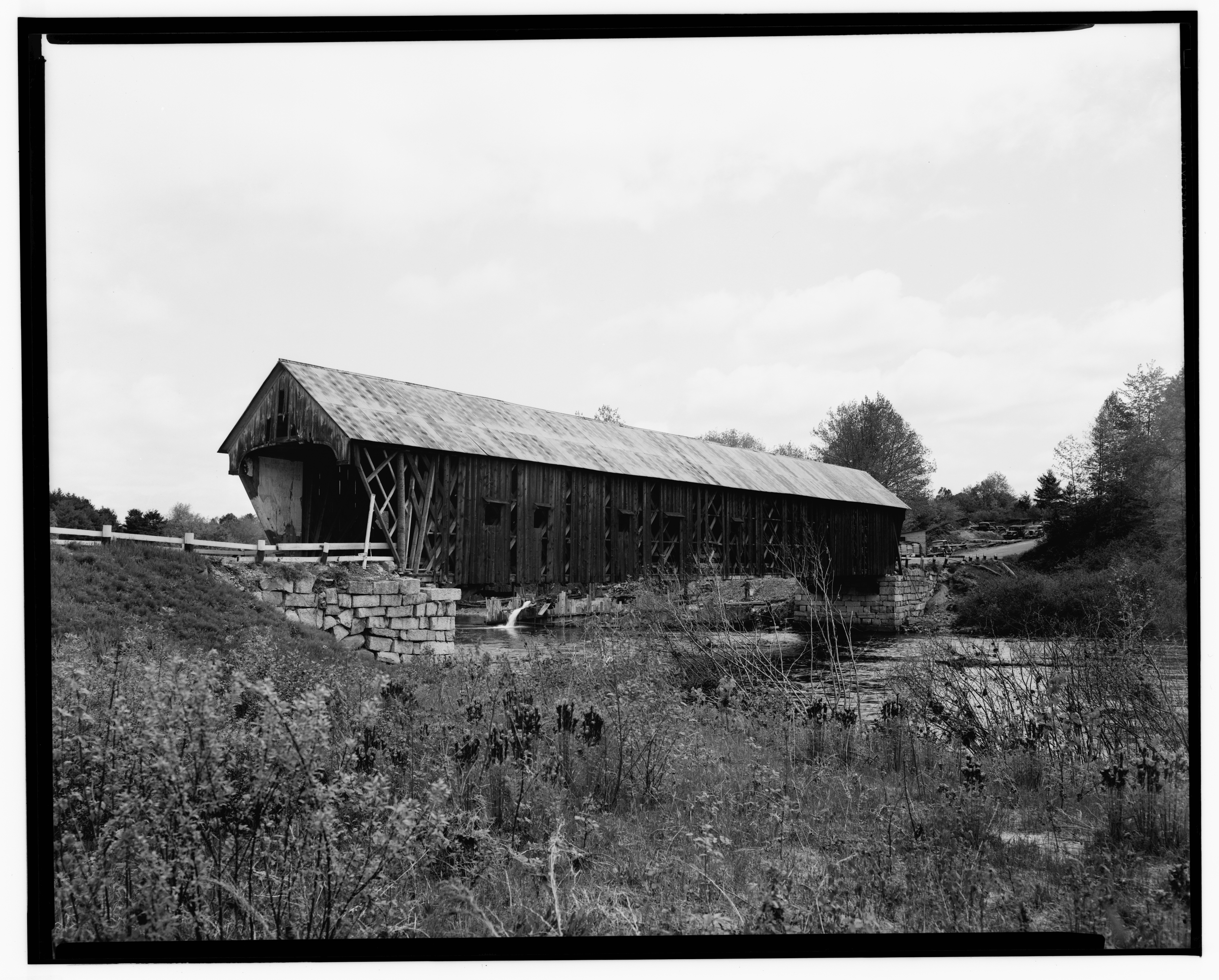
- View looking north west - Covered Bridge, Spanning Contoocook River, Hopkinton, NH
- Coordinates: 43.181700°N 71.751880°W
- Crosses: Contoocook River
- Named for: New road to Henniker, New Hampshire
- Owner: Town of Hopkinton
- Historic American Buildings Survey: HABS NH-30
- Website: www.loc.gov/pictures/item/nh0143/
- Preceded by: Stone arch bridge washed away in 1852
- Followed by: Steel truss bridge just north of it which is no longer in existence

Characteristics
- Design: Briggs Truss
- Material: Stone piers
- Trough construction: Wood lattice and arch
- Total length: 180 ft.
- Width: 20 ft.
- Height: 22 ft.
- No. of spans: 1

History
- Constructed by: John C. Briggs
- Construction start: 1863
- Construction cost: $2,500
- Rebuilt: 1935
- Closed: 1936

New Henniker Bridge or New Bridge was a covered bridge in West Hopkinton, New Hampshire, which carried Henniker Road over the Contoocook River. The truss bridge was completed in 1863, and was the second bridge on the site. The original stone arch bridge was built in 1845 and was washed away by flood in 1852. The bridge was just over 20 feet (6.1 m) wide and 180 feet (55 m) long, and consisted of a single span supported by two triple lattice trusses resting on granite abutments. The patent drawings show an all-timber truss with fixed intersection angles in the center of the span. At the ends of the span the angles of the diagonals vary. The end post is vertical, and each brace further from it is sloped a little more.

In 1935 the bridge had sustained damage during a flood and was repaired. The bridge was utilized until 1936 when a steel truss bridge was built adjoining it to the north and ready for traffic. The covered bridge was then destroyed.

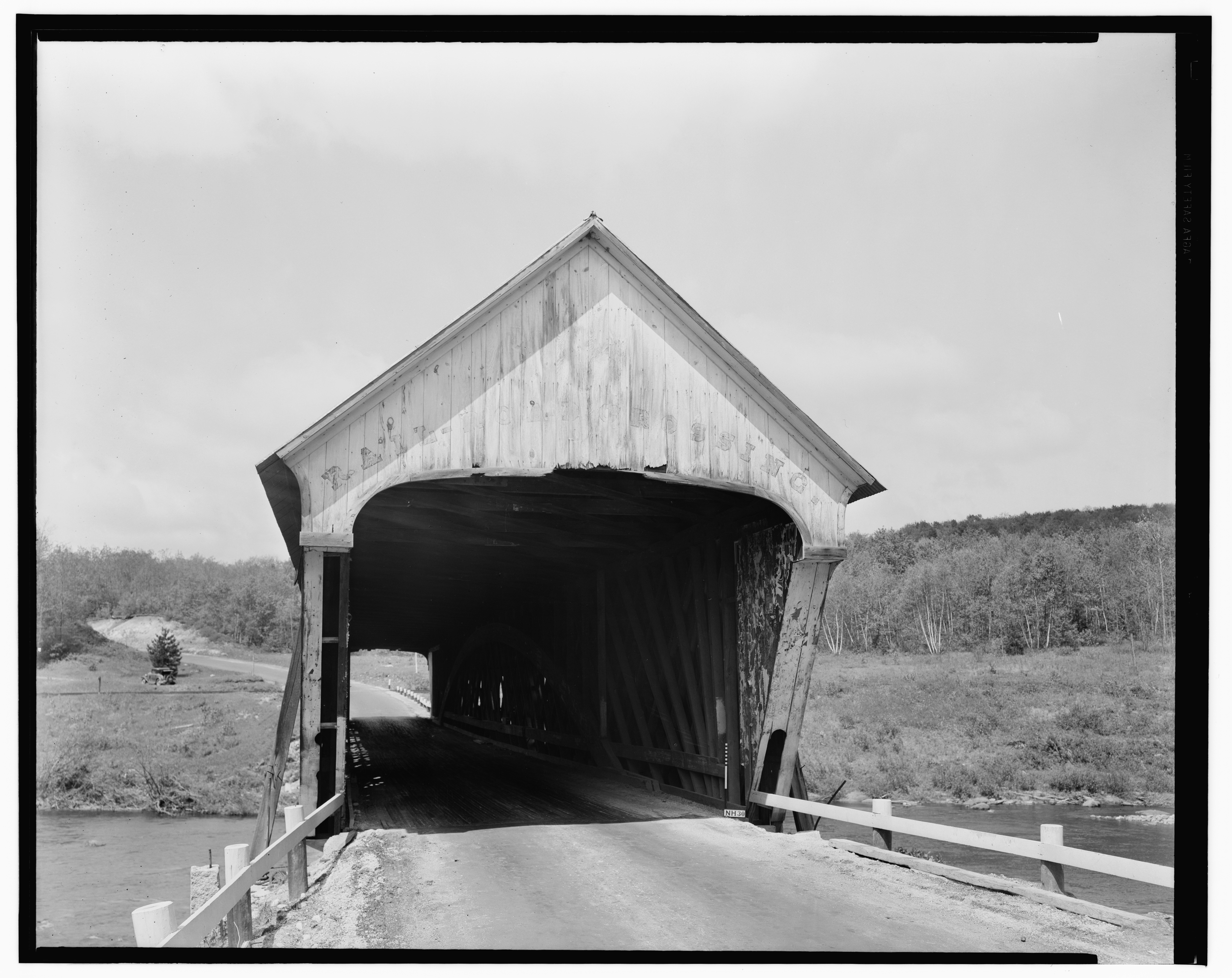
View looking west with railroad line in the background

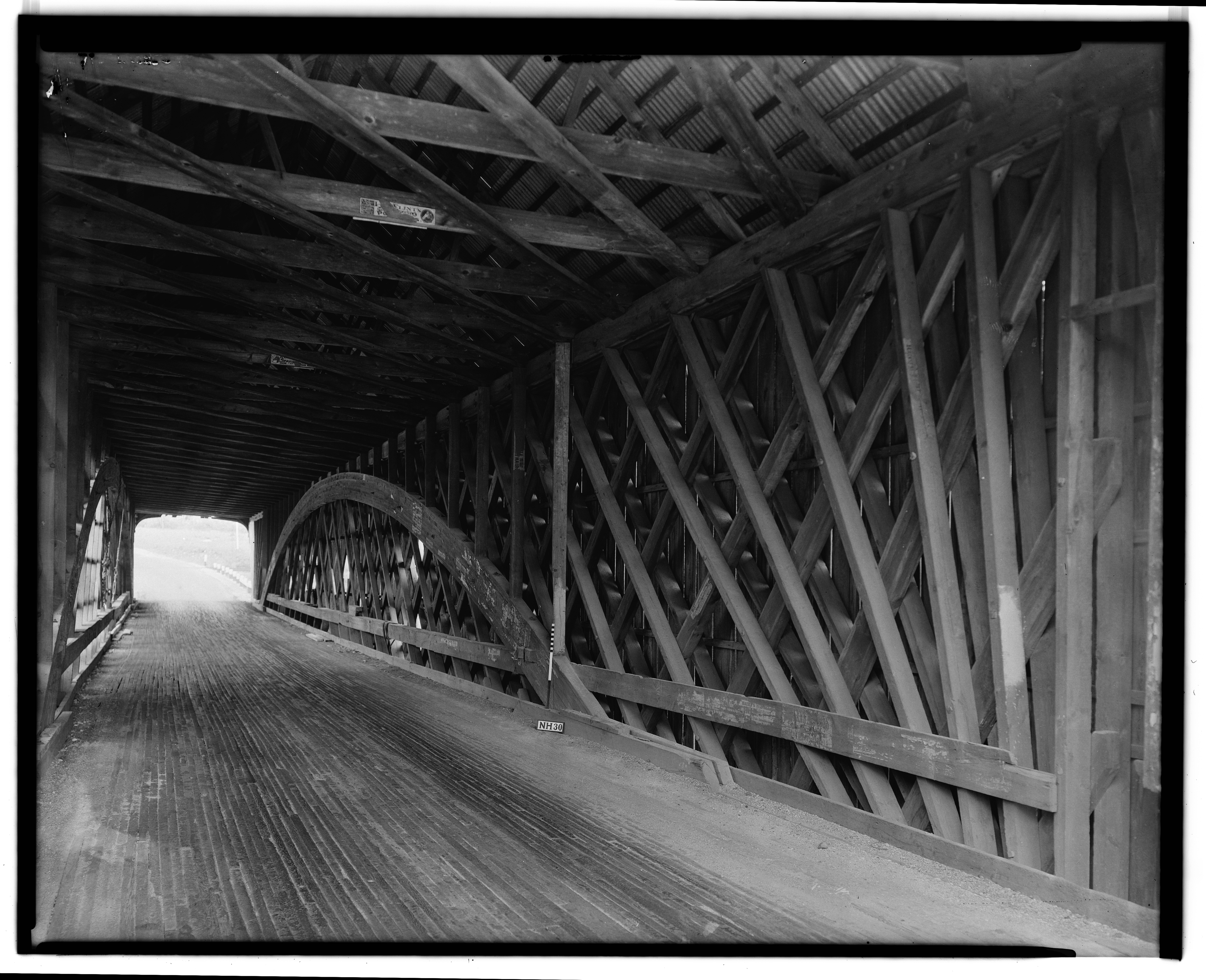
Interior looking north west
