= West Hopkinton, New Hampshire =

Unincorporated community in New Hampshire, United States

- Populated place
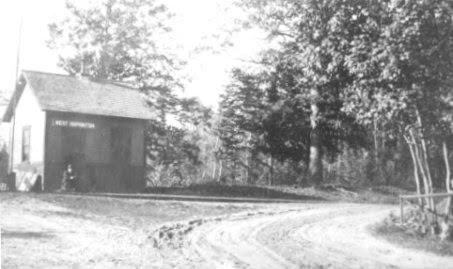
- West Hopkinton Railroad Depot circa early 1900s

- Location within New Hampshire Location within the United States
- Coordinates: 43°11′31″N 71°44′53″W
- Country: United States
- State: New Hampshire
- County: Merrimack
- Town: Hopkinton
- Elevation: 377 ft (115 m)
- Time zone: UTC-5 (Eastern (EST))
  - Summer (DST): UTC-4 (EDT)
- ZIP code: 03229
- Area code: 603
- FIPS code: 33-82260
- GNIS feature ID: 870776

West Hopkinton is a populated place within the town of Hopkinton in Merrimack County, New Hampshire, United States. West Hopkinton is well known for its agricultural center, preservation of historical landmarks and recreational activities within the village.

== History ==
West Hopkinton was once a thriving village with many businesses such as several mills including the Kingsbury & Davis Machine Company, a creamery, grocery store and a number of working farms. West Hopkinton had its own post office which opened on May 29, 1857; a small railroad depot on the original Contoocook River Railroad line, the Rowell's Covered Bridge and New Henniker Bridge.

As a result of increased flooding in the Northeast in the early 20th century, plans for the Hopkinton-Everett Dams were developed, with the Hopkinton Dam being built 0.2 miles (0.3 km) south of West Hopkinton on the Contoocook River and the Everett Dam on the Piscataquog River in the town of Weare. The dams were completed in 1962. The resulting flood control lands are connected by an artificial channel that crosses the height of land between the two river valleys.

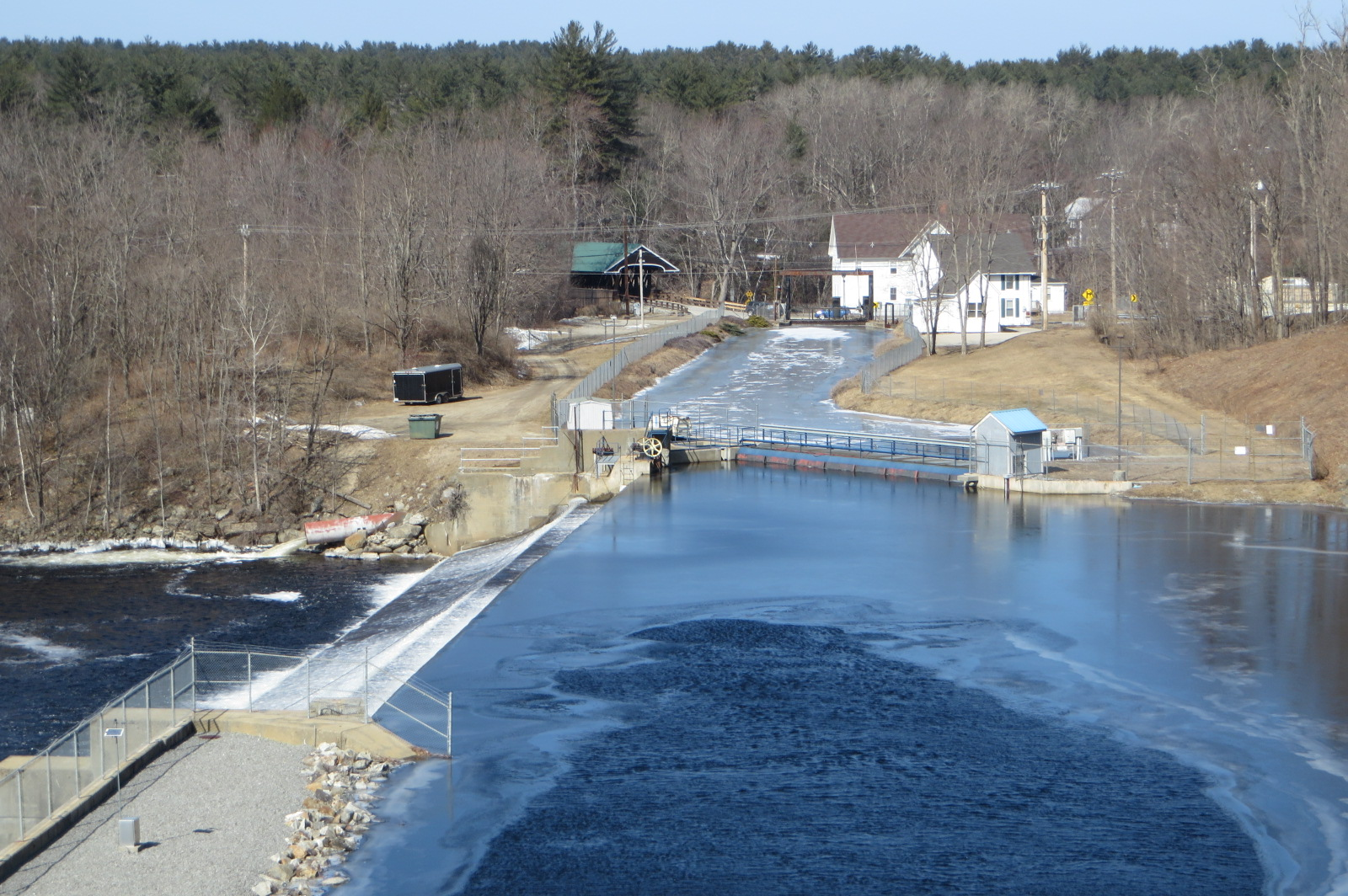
West Hopkinton as viewed from the Hopkinton Dam on the Contoocook River
