= Cold River (Connecticut River tributary) =

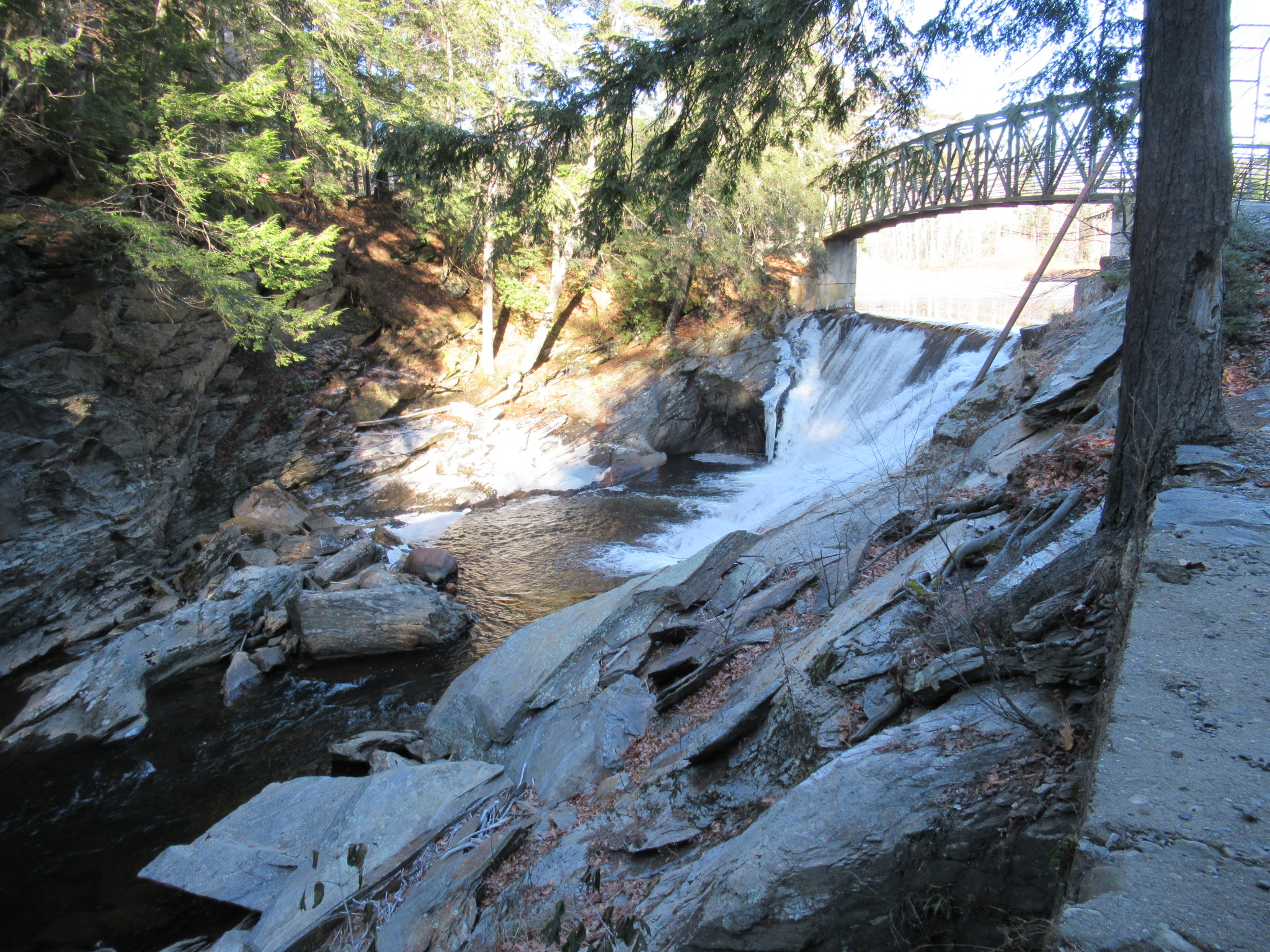
- The Cold River exiting Vilas Pool in Alstead, NH

- Location within New Hampshire Location within the United States

Location
- Country: United States
- State: New Hampshire
- Counties: Sullivan, Cheshire
- Towns: Lempster, Acworth, Langdon, Alstead, Walpole

Physical characteristics
- Source: Crescent Lake
  - location: Acworth
  - coordinates: 43°16′1″N 72°14′25″W
  - elevation: 1,211 ft (369 m)
- Mouth: Connecticut River
  - location: Walpole
  - coordinates: 43°7′6″N 72°25′51″W
  - elevation: 230 ft (70 m)
- Length: 22.6 mi (36.4 km)

Basin features
- Tributaries
  - left: Dodge Brook, Honey Brook, Great Brook, Warren Brook
  - right: Bowers Brook, Great Brook

The Cold River is a 22.6-mile-long (36.4 km) river in western New Hampshire in the United States. It is a tributary of the Connecticut River, which flows to Long Island Sound.

The Cold River begins at the outlet of Crescent Lake in the northeastern corner of the town of Acworth. The river flows east into the town of Lempster, then turns south and reenters Acworth. When Dodge Brook joins the river, it turns west and makes its way to the Connecticut River, passing the villages of South Acworth, Alstead, and Drewsville. The river reaches the Connecticut just south of the communities of Bellows Falls, Vermont, and North Walpole, New Hampshire.

In October 2005, flooding on the Cold River and its tributaries caused severe damage in the towns of Alstead, Acworth, and Walpole.

== Tributaries ==
(from upstream to downstream)

- Dodge Brook (from east, near East Acworth)
- Honey Brook (from southeast, between East Acworth and South Acworth)
- Bowers Brook (from north, in South Acworth village)
- Great Brook (from south, below South Acworth)
- Warren Brook (in Alstead)
- Great Brook (from north, in Langdon)

== See also ==
- List of rivers of New Hampshire
