= Langdon, New Hampshire =

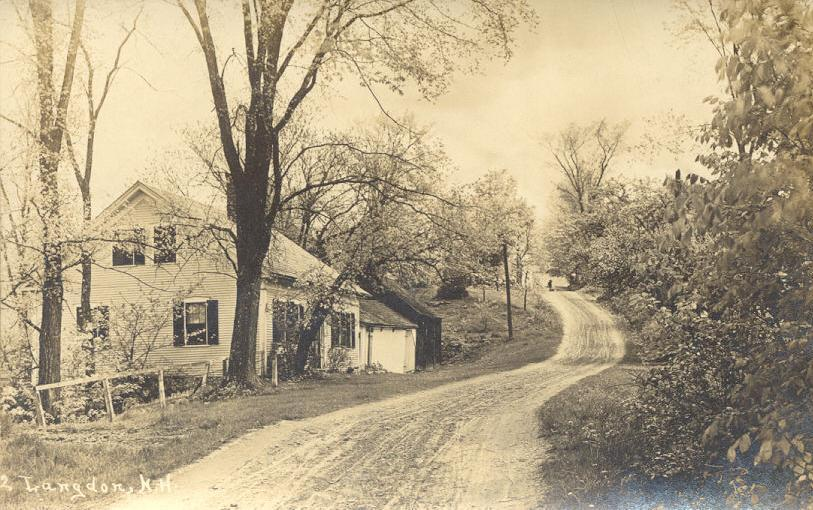
- Street scene, c. 1909

- Seal

- Location in Sullivan County and the state of New Hampshire.
- Coordinates: 43°10′08″N 72°22′53″W
- Country: United States
- State: New Hampshire
- County: Sullivan
- Incorporated: 1787

Area
  - Total: 16.3 sq mi (42.3 km^{2})
  - Land: 16.3 sq mi (42.1 km^{2})
  - Water: 0.077 sq mi (0.2 km^{2}) 0.45%
- Elevation: 637 ft (194 m)

Population (2020)
  - Total: 651
  - Density: 40/sq mi (15.5/km^{2})
- Time zone: UTC-5 (Eastern)
  - Summer (DST): UTC-4 (Eastern)
- ZIP code: 03602
- Area code: 603
- FIPS code: 33-40900
- GNIS feature ID: 873642
- Website: langdonnh.org

Langdon is a town in Sullivan County, New Hampshire, United States. The population was 651 at the 2020 census.

== History ==
First settled in 1773 by Seth Walker, Langdon was incorporated on January 11, 1787, when it was named after Governor John Langdon. The town is home to the Prentiss Bridge, the shortest covered bridge in New Hampshire. Built across Great Brook in 1874, the lattice truss span has a length of 34 feet 6 inches (10.52 m).

== Geography ==
According to the United States Census Bureau, the town has a total area of 16.3 square miles (42.3 km^{2}), of which 0.1 square miles (0.2 km^{2}) are water, comprising 0.45% of the town. Drained by the Cold River and its tributary Great Brook, Langdon lies within the Connecticut River watershed. The highest point in town is the summit of Holden Hill, at 1,348 feet (411 m) above sea level.

=== Adjacent municipalities ===
- Charlestown (north)
- Acworth (east)
- Alstead (southeast)
- Walpole (southwest)

== Demographics ==
Historical population
Census	Pop.	Note	%±
1790	244		—
1800	484		98.4%
1810	632		30.6%
1820	654		3.5%
1830	667		2.0%
1840	615		−7.8%
1850	575		−6.5%
1860	478		−16.9%
1870	411		−14.0%
1880	364		−11.4%
1890	305		−16.2%
1900	339		11.1%
1910	340		0.3%
1920	279		−17.9%
1930	267		−4.3%
1940	276		3.4%
1950	378		37.0%
1960	338		−10.6%
1970	337		−0.3%
1980	437		29.7%
1990	580		32.7%
2000	586		1.0%
2010	688		17.4%
2020	651		−5.4%
U.S. Decennial Census

As of the census of 2000, there were 586 people, 237 households, and 174 families residing in the town. The population density was 36.0 inhabitants per square mile (13.9/km^{2}). There were 269 housing units at an average density of 16.5 per square mile (6.4/km^{2}). The racial makeup of the town was 99.66% White, 0.17% from other races, and 0.17% from two or more races. Hispanic or Latino of any race were 0.17% of the population.

There were 237 households, out of which 29.5% had children under the age of 18 living with them, 65.4% were married couples living together, 5.5% had a female householder with no husband present, and 26.2% were non-families. 21.1% of all households were made up of individuals, and 8.4% had someone living alone who was 65 years of age or older. The average household size was 2.47 and the average family size was 2.85.

In the town, the population was spread out, with 21.3% under the age of 18, 5.3% from 18 to 24, 30.2% from 25 to 44, 31.2% from 45 to 64, and 11.9% who were 65 years of age or older. The median age was 41 years. For every 100 females, there were 113.1 males. For every 100 females age 18 and over, there were 105.8 males.

The median income for a household in the town was $42,083, and the median income for a family was $43,125. Males had a median income of $33,750 versus $24,444 for females. The per capita income for the town was $24,572. About 3.3% of families and 3.8% of the population were below the poverty line, including none of those under age 18 and 12.3% of those age 65 or over.

== Site of interest ==
- Prentiss Bridge – New Hampshire's smallest covered bridge
