= Great Brook (Cold River tributary) =

- Location within New Hampshire Location within the United States

Location
- Country: United States
- State: New Hampshire
- County: Sullivan
- Towns: Acworth, Charlestown, Langdon

Physical characteristics
- Source
  - location: Acworth
  - coordinates: 43°13′54″N 72°18′46″W
  - elevation: 1,535 ft (468 m)
- Mouth: Cold River
  - location: Langdon
  - coordinates: 43°8′14″N 72°24′15″W
  - elevation: 305 ft (93 m)
- Length: 10.0 mi (16.1 km)

Basin features
- Tributaries
  - left: Putnam Brook
  - right: Jed Brook, Fifield Brook, Little Brook, Brush Meadow Brook, Jewett Brook

Great Brook is a 10.0-mile-long (16.1 km) tributary of the Cold River in western New Hampshire in the United States.

Part of the Connecticut River watershed, Great Brook begins in the highlands in the town of Acworth, New Hampshire, and flows southwest through the center of the town of Langdon, joining the Cold River 2 miles (3 km) upstream from the Connecticut River.

== See also ==
- List of rivers of New Hampshire
