= Kenison =

Kenison is a surname. Notable people with the surname include:

- Frank R. Kenison (1907–1980), American lawyer and judge
- Katrina Kenison (fl. 1991–2013), American author
- Linda Kenison (fl. 2014–2018), American politician

== See also ==
- Keniston Bridge
