= Bog Bridge =

- U.S. National Register of Historic Places
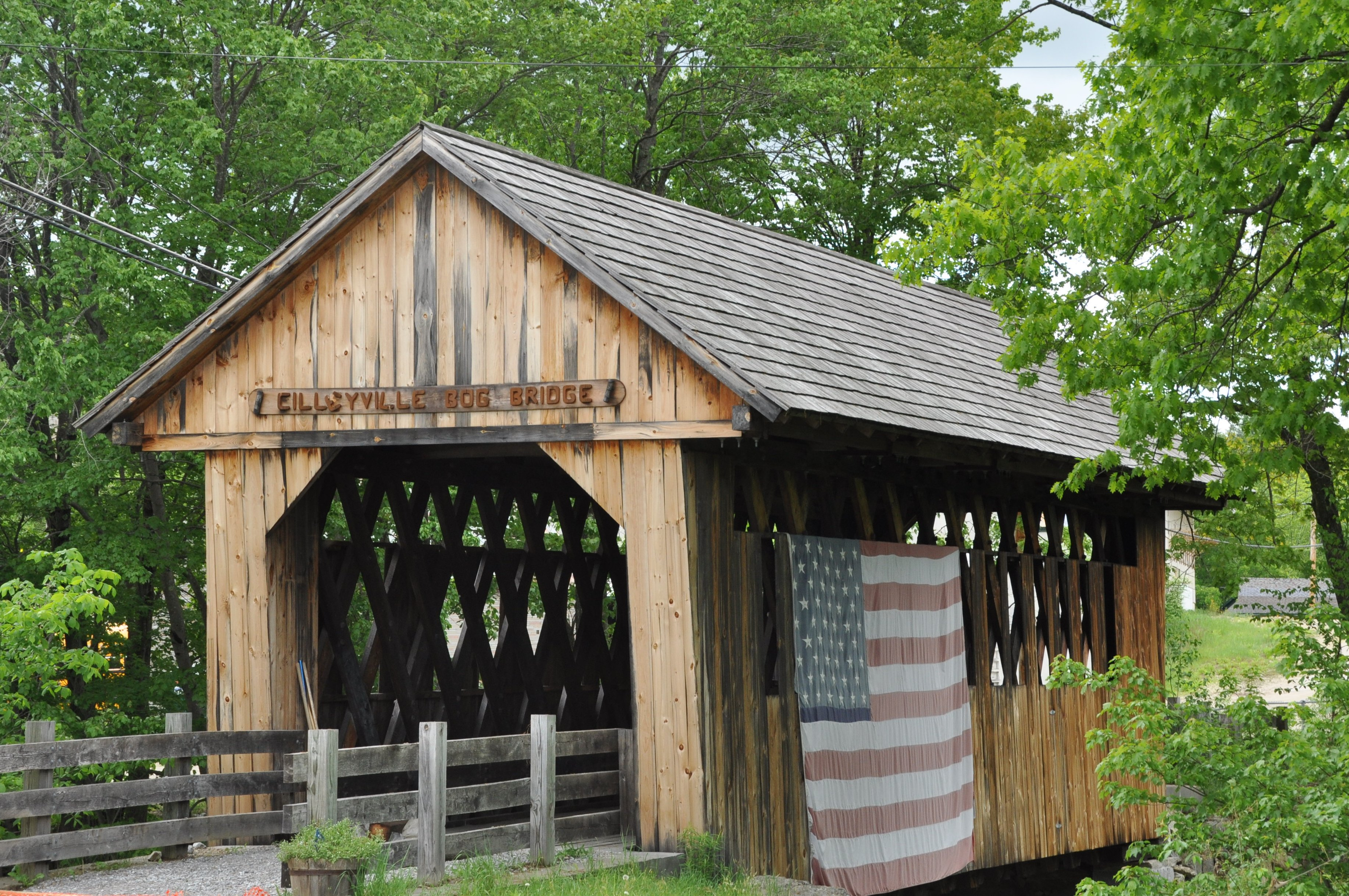

- Location within New Hampshire Location within the United States
- Location: Off NH 11 over Pleasant Brook, Andover, New Hampshire
- Coordinates: 43°25′49″N 71°52′11″W
- Area: 0.1 acres (0.040 ha)
- Built: 1887
- Built by: Atwood, Prentice C.
- Architectural style: Town through truss
- NRHP reference No.: 89000192
- Added to NRHP: March 16, 1989

Officially known as the Cilleyville-Bog Bridge, this structure began its tenure named simply Bog Bridge. There was already a Cilleyville Bridge just eight hundred feet away on the Blackwater River, located in an area of Andover named after the Cilley family. When that bridge burned down in 1908, the Bog Bridge became known as the Cilleyville Bridge since it was the only one left in Cilleyville.

The Cilleyville-Bog Bridge, is a historic covered bridge in Andover, New Hampshire. Built in 1887 and located off New Hampshire Route 11 west of Andover center, the Town lattice truss bridge is one of New Hampshire's few surviving 19th-century covered bridges. The bridge was listed on the National Register of Historic Places in 1989.

== Description and history ==
The Cilleyville-Bog Bridge spans Pleasant Brook, a tributary of the Blackwater River, just south of where New Hampshire Route 11 crosses the river. The bridge is 53 feet (16 m) long and 13 feet (4.0 m) wide, with a span over the brook of 49 feet (15 m), and is clad in vertical planking. The asphalt shingle roof, a replacement made in 1982, is the only major modification to the bridge. The bridge rests on abutments of roughly coursed granite blocks; the eastern abutment is original, without mortar, while the western abutment was damaged in the 1938 New England hurricane and rebuilt with cement mortar. The trusses were at some time reinforced with iron bolts. The bridge is unusual among New Hampshire's covered bridges in that it lacks lateral bracing, which caused the bridge to be slightly tilted for many years.

The Town through truss bridge was built in 1887 by local carpenter Prentice C. Atwood. The bridge originally carried Bog Road across Pleasant Brook, but was reduced to foot traffic when the current alignment of New Hampshire Route 11 bypassed it in 1957.

The Cilleyville-Bog Bridge was closed in 1997 for safety concerns. Through an extensive fundraising campaign by the Cilleyville-Bog Bridge Restoration Committee, the bridge was repaired and reopened in 2003.

Of at least seven documented 19th or early 20th-century covered bridges in the town, it is one of only two that survives (the other is the Keniston Bridge).

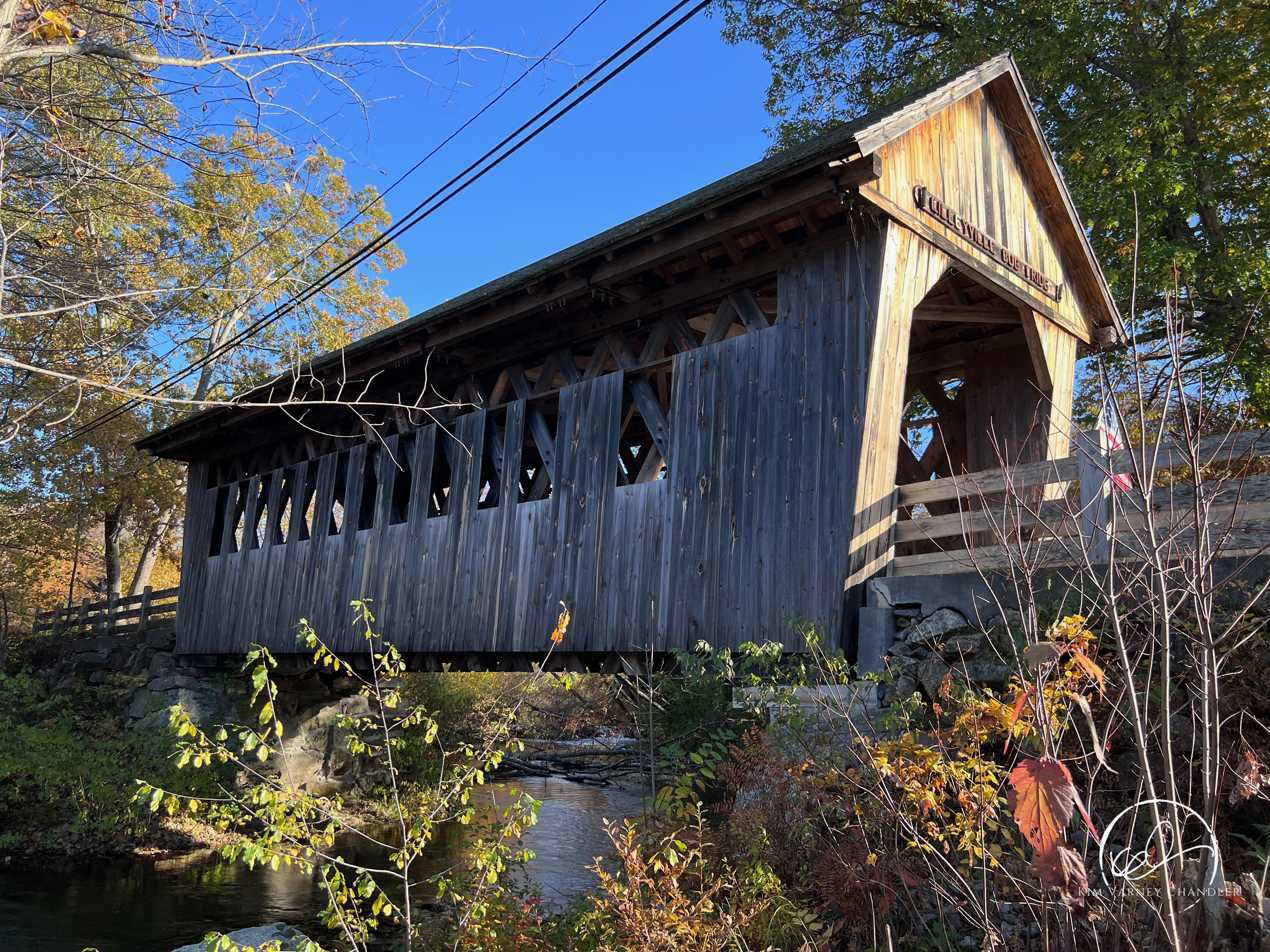
Cilleyville-Bog Bridge, 2022

== See also ==
- National Register of Historic Places listings in Merrimack County, New Hampshire
- List of bridges on the National Register of Historic Places in New Hampshire
