= List of bridges on the National Register of Historic Places in New Hampshire =

This is a list of bridges on the National Register of Historic Places in the U.S. state of New Hampshire. (Note: Tunnels would also be listed here; New Hampshire does not yet have any tunnels listed on the National Register of Historic Places.)

== Current listings ==
Name	Image	Built	Listed	Location	County	Type
Ashuelot Covered Bridge		ca. 1864	February 20, 1981	Ashuelot; 42°46′35″N 72°25′26″W	Cheshire	Town lattice truss
Bath Covered Bridge	Bath Covered Bridge	1832	September 1, 1976	Bath; 44°10′1″N 71°58′3″W	Grafton	Burr truss
Bedell Covered Bridge		1866	May 28, 1975	Haverhill; 44°2′53″N 72°4′20″W	Grafton	Burr arch truss
Bement Covered Bridge		1854	November 21, 1976	Bradford; 43°15′51″N 71°57′13″W	Merrimack	
Blow-Me-Down Covered Bridge		1877	May 19, 1978	Plainfield; 43°31′2″N 72°22′28″W	Sullivan	Kingpost truss
Bog Bridge	Bog Bridge	1887	March 16, 1989	Andover; 43°25′49″N 71°52′11″W	Merrimack	Town through truss
Carleton Bridge	Carleton Bridge	1869	June 10, 1975	East Swanzey; 42°51′14″N 72°16′28″W	Cheshire	Queenpost truss
Cold River Bridge	McDermott Bridge	1869	May 17, 1973	Langdon; 43°10′13″N 72°20′46″W	Sullivan	Town lattice truss
Columbia Covered Bridge		1912	December 12, 1976	Columbia; 44°51′12″N 71°33′5″W	Coos	Howe truss
Contoocook Railroad Bridge		1849, 1889, 1936	January 11, 1980	Contoocook; 43°13′23″N 71°42′51″W	Merrimack	Town pratt truss; crosses Contoocook River
Coombs Covered Bridge	Coombs Covered Bridge	1837	November 21, 1976	Winchester; 42°50′17″N 72°21′43″W	Cheshire	Town truss
Cornish–Windsor Covered Bridge		1866	November 21, 1976	Cornish; 43°28′26″N 72°23′1″W	Sullivan	Town lattice truss
County Farm Bridge		1885	May 14, 1981	Wilton; 42°51′25″N 71°49′3″W	Hillsborough	Stone arch
County Farm Bridge		ca. 1875	May 21, 1975	Dover; 43°13′14″N 70°56′38″W	Strafford	Howe truss
Dalton Covered Bridge	Dalton Bridge	1853	November 21, 1976	Warner; 43°16′36″N 71°48′43″W	Merrimack	Panel truss
Dingleton Hill Covered Bridge	Dingleton Hill Covered Bridge	1882, 1883	November 8, 1978	Cornish Mills; 43°27′51″N 72°22′9″W	Sullivan	Kingpost truss
Durgin Bridge	Durgin Bridge	1869	September 22, 1983	Sandwich; 43°51′21″N 71°21′53″W	Carroll	Paddleford truss
Gilsum Stone Arch Bridge	Gilsum Stone Arch Bridge	1863	August 31, 1989	Gilsum; 43°2′20″N 72°16′14″W	Cheshire	Dry masonry stone arch
Goffstown Covered Railroad Bridge		1901	June 18, 1975	Goffstown; 43°1′4″N 71°35′58″W	Hillsborough	Town pratt truss; destroyed by fire.
Great Hollow Road Stone Arch Bridge	Great Hollow Road Stone Arch Bridge	1914	May 12, 1997	Hanover; 43°41′13″N 72°14′0″W	Grafton	Stone arch
Hancock–Greenfield Bridge	Hancock-Greenfield Bridge	1937	May 5, 1981	Hancock; 42°57′25″N 71°56′8″W	Hillsborough	Teco pratt timber truss
Haverhill–Bath Covered Bridge	Haverhill-Bath Covered Bridge	1829	April 18, 1977	Woodsville; 44°9′16″N 72°2′12″W	Grafton	Town lattice truss
Hillsborough Railroad Bridge	Hillsborough Railroad Bridge	1903	June 10, 1975	Hillsborough; 43°6′48″N 71°53′44″W	Hillsborough	Town lattice truss; destroyed by fire.
Keniston Bridge	Keniston Bridge	1882	March 16, 1989	Andover; 43°26′6″N 71°50′12″W	Merrimack	Town through truss
Kenyon Bridge	Kenyon Bridge	1882	May 22, 1978	Cornish City; 43°28′0″N 72°21′3″W	Sullivan	Multiple kingpost truss
Lyme–East Thetford Bridge	Lyme–East Thetford Bridge	1937	March 27, 2020	Lyme; 43.812144°N 72.1831°W	Grafton	Parker truss
Meadow Bridge	Meadow Bridge	1897	December 10, 2003	Shelburne; 44°24′5″N 71°3′49″W	Coos	Multiple steel truss
Meriden Bridge	Meriden Bridge	ca. 1880	August 27, 1980	Meriden; 43°33′12″N 72°16′0″W	Sullivan	Multiple kingpost truss
Milford Suspension Bridge		1889	July 17, 2017	Milford; 42°50′12″N 71°38′44″W	Hillsborough	Suspension bridge
Mount Orne Covered Bridge		1911	December 12, 1976	Lancaster; 44°27′38″N 71°39′12″W	Coos	Howe truss
Pier Bridge	Pier Bridge	1907	June 10, 1975	Newport; 43°21′43″N 72°14′31″W	Sullivan	Town lattice truss
Piermont Bridge	Piermont Bridge	1928	June 6, 2001	Piermont; 43°58′40″N 72°6′45″W	Grafton	Pennsylvania through truss
Pineground Bridge	Pineground Bridge	1887	March 10, 2004	Chichester; 43°15′26″N 71°22′12″W	Merrimack	Lenticular through truss
Prentiss Bridge	Prentiss Bridge	ca. 1874	May 24, 1973	Langdon; 43°9′11″N 72°23′38″W	Sullivan	Town lattice truss
Rowell's Covered Bridge	Rowell's Bridge	1852, 1853	November 21, 1976	West Hopkinton; 43°11′30″N 71°45′40″W	Merrimack	Long patent truss;Burr arch
Samuel Morey Memorial Bridge	The Samuel Morey Memorial Bridge	1936, 1938	December 8, 1997	Orford; 43°54′25″N 72°8′23″W	Grafton	Steel arch
Sawyers Crossing Covered Bridge	Cresson Bridge	1859	November 14, 1978	Swanzey; 42°53′8″N 72°17′0″W	Cheshire	Town truss
Slate Covered Bridge	Slate Covered Bridge	1862	November 14, 1978	Westport; 42°50′51″N 72°20′29″W	Cheshire	Town lattice truss
Stark Covered Bridge	Stark Covered Bridge	ca. 1857	December 1, 1980	Groveton; 44°36′3″N 71°24′30″W	Coos	Paddleford truss
Stone Arch Bridge	Stone Arch Bridge	1847	August 12, 2012	Keene; 45°54′51″N 72°15′11″W	Cheshire	
Stone Arch Underpass	Stone Arch Underpass	1848	September 12, 1985	Lebanon; 43°38′3″N 72°18′21″W	Grafton	
Sulphite Railroad Bridge	Sulphite Railroad Bridge	1897	June 11, 1975	Franklin; 43°26′43″N 71°38′10″W	Merrimack	Pratt truss
Swiftwater Covered Bridge	Swiftwater Bridge	1849	November 21, 1976	Bath; 44°8′3″N 71°57′5″W	Grafton	Paddleford truss
Tilton Island Park Bridge	Tilton Island Park Bridge	1858, 1881	March 21, 1980	Tilton; 43°26′32″N 71°35′13″W	Belknap	Truesdell truss
Waterloo Covered Bridge	Waterloo Covered Bridge	1859, 1860	November 21, 1976	Waterloo; 43°17′16″N 71°51′27″W	Merrimack	Town lattice truss
West Swanzey Covered Bridge	West Swanzey Covered Bridge	1832	February 29, 1980	West Swanzey; 42°52′18″N 72°19′42″W	Cheshire	Town truss
Whittier Bridge	Whittier Bridge	ca. 1870	March 15, 1984	Ossipee; 43°49′13″N 71°11′59″W	Carroll	Paddleford truss
Wright's Bridge	Wright's Bridge	1906	June 10, 1975	Newport; 43°21′33″N 72°15′34″W	Sullivan	Town lattice truss

== Former listing ==
Name	Image	Built	Listed	Removed	Location	County	Type
Corbin Covered Bridge	Corbin Covered Bridge	1845	December 6, 1976	September 2, 1993	Newport	Sullivan	Town lattice truss; rebuilt after a 1993 fire. Image is of the replacement bridge.

== See also ==
- List of covered bridges in New Hampshire
