= Sulphite Railroad Bridge =

- U.S. National Register of Historic Places
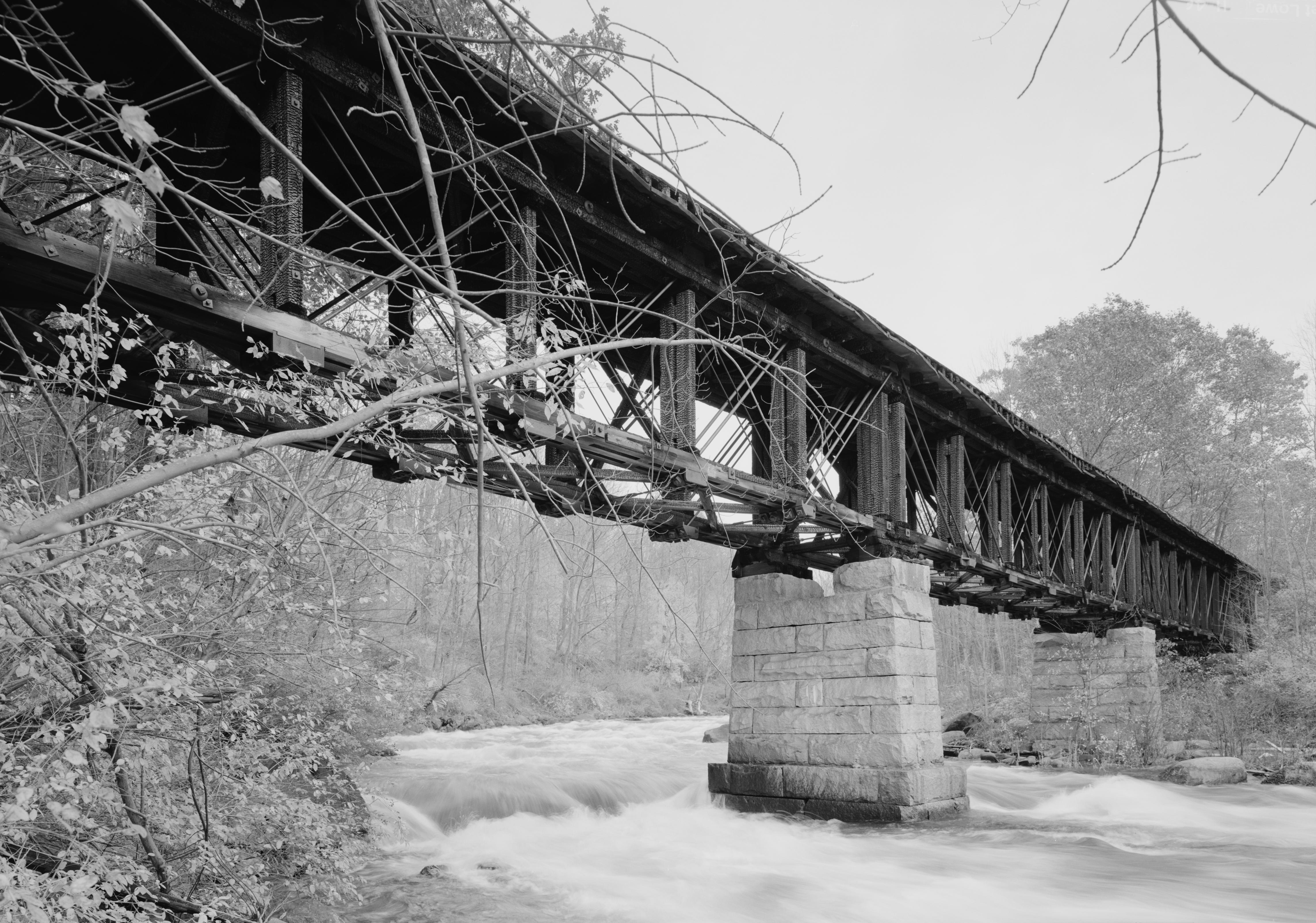
- HABS/HAER photo, 2003

- Location within New Hampshire Location within the United States
- Location: Off US 3 over Winnipesaukee River, Franklin, New Hampshire
- Coordinates: 43°26′42″N 71°38′7″W
- Area: 0.3 acres (0.12 ha)
- Built: 1897
- Built by: Boston & Maine Railroad
- Architectural style: Pratt truss
- NRHP reference No.: 75000130
- Added to NRHP: June 11, 1975

The Sulphite Railroad Bridge, also known locally as the Upside-Down Covered Bridge is a historic railroad bridge in Franklin, New Hampshire. The bridge was built circa 1896-7 to carry the tracks of the Boston and Maine Railroad across the Winnipesaukee River between Franklin and Tilton. The bridge is believed to be the only surviving "upside down" covered railroad bridge in the United States, in which the rail bed is laid on top of the bridge roof, whose purpose is to shelter the trusses below. The bridge was listed on the National Register of Historic Places in 1975. The bridge, unused since 1973, is not in good condition, having been subjected to graffiti, vandalism, and arson, as well as the elements.

== Description and history ==
The Sulphite Railroad Bridge is located about 0.7 miles (1.1 km) east of downtown Franklin, and about 350 yards (320 m) south of US Route 3, and crosses the river at a point where its banks are quite steep; it is not readily visible from any roadway, but may be seen from the Winnipesaukee River Trail. The bridge is 234 feet (71 m) long, and consists of three spans, each supported by Pratt trusses resting on granite piers or abutments. The main central span measures 180 feet (55 m).

The bridge was built about 1896-7 by the Boston and Maine Railroad, replacing a standard trestle bridge built in 1892 by the Franklin and Tilton Railroad. The bridge acquired its name for the large amount of sulfite carried by the rail line to paper mills in Franklin. The mills, which were the principal users of the line, closed in the 1920s, and another covered bridge on the line, crossing the Merrimack River, was washed away by flooding in 1936. The railroad line was shut down entirely in 1973. The bridge is believed to be the only surviving "upside down" covered railroad bridge, in which the rail bed is laid on top of the bridge roof, whose purpose is to shelter the trusses below.

== See also ==
- List of bridges documented by the Historic American Engineering Record in New Hampshire
- List of bridges on the National Register of Historic Places in New Hampshire
- List of New Hampshire covered bridges
- National Register of Historic Places listings in Merrimack County, New Hampshire
