= Milford Suspension Bridge =

- U.S. National Register of Historic Places
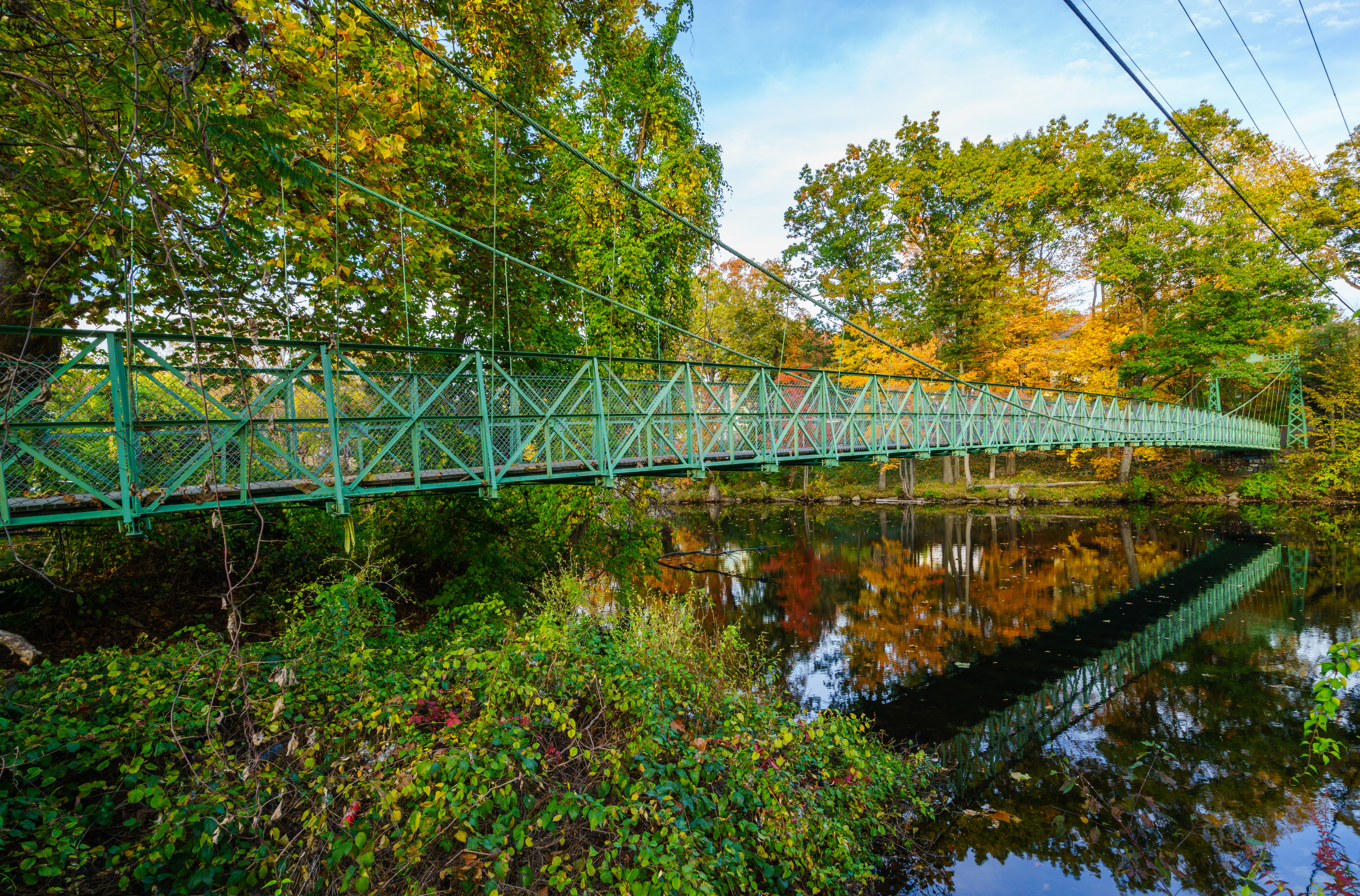

- Location within New Hampshire Location within the United States
- Location: Spanning Souhegan River near downtown Milford, New Hampshire
- Coordinates: 42°50′12″N 71°38′44″W
- Built: 1889
- Architectural style: Cable suspension bridge
- NRHP reference No.: 100001321
- Added to NRHP: July 17, 2017

The Milford Suspension Bridge is a historic pedestrian bridge spanning the Souhegan River between Bridge and Souhegan Streets in Milford, New Hampshire. Built in 1889, it is the only surviving work of the Berlin Iron Bridge Company in the state, and one of a small number of surviving 19th-century suspension bridges. It was listed on the National Register of Historic Places in 2017.

== Description and history ==
The Milford Suspension Bridge is located a short walk east of the Milford Oval in downtown Milford, extending from the eastern end of Bridge Street across the Souhegan River. The bridge is 275 feet (84 m) long, and is built out of a combination of riveted iron work and cabling. Its deck is made of wood, and its sides have been protected by modern chain link fencing. It rests on abutments fashioned out of roughly quarried local granite.

The bridge was built in 1889, at a time when it was common to travel by foot from the city's residential area on the north side of the river, to its industrial, commercial and civic facilities on the south side. The abutments were built by a local stone worker, and the bridge structure was built by the Berlin Iron Bridge Company, a major New England builder of metal bridges in the late 19th century. The company is known to have built 78 bridges in the state, of which this is the only one left. The bridge underwent a major restoration in 1975, at which time the chain link fencing was installed.

== See also ==
- List of bridges on the National Register of Historic Places in New Hampshire
- National Register of Historic Places listings in Hillsborough County, New Hampshire
