= Stone Arch Underpass =

- U.S. National Register of Historic Places
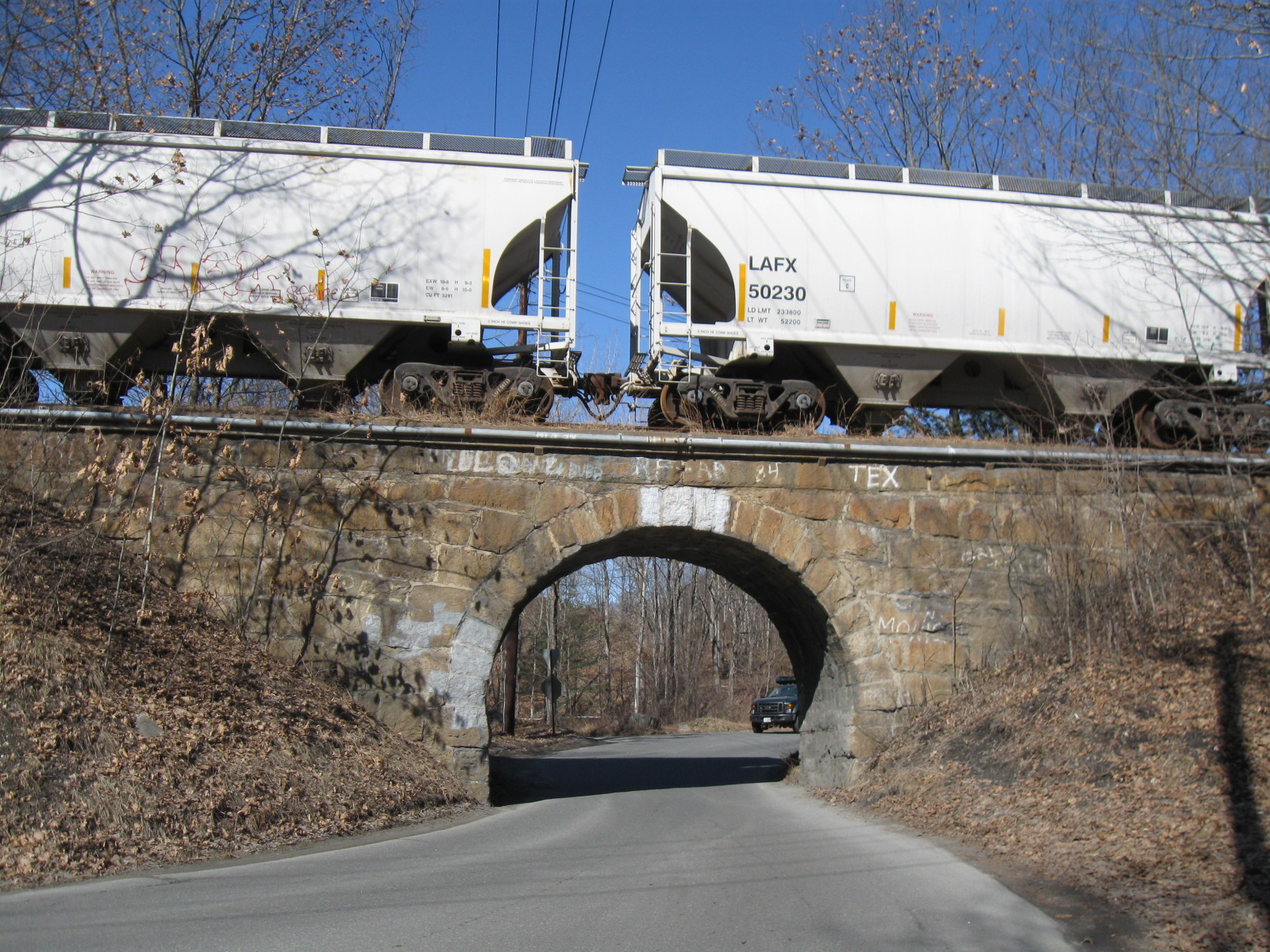

- Location within New Hampshire Location within the United States
- Location: Glen Rd., Lebanon, New Hampshire
- Coordinates: 43°38′3″N 72°18′21″W
- Area: 0.2 acres (0.081 ha)
- Built: 1848
- Built by: Northern Railroad
- NRHP reference No.: 85002190
- Added to NRHP: September 12, 1985

The Stone Arch Underpass is a historic stone arch bridge spanning Glen Road in Lebanon, New Hampshire. Built about 1848, it carried the Boston and Maine Railroad's former Northern Line. It is one of a small number of 19th-century stone arch bridges in the state, and the only one known in central western New Hampshire. The bridge was listed on the National Register of Historic Places in 1985. The railroad right-of-way has been functionally abandoned, and the bridge may become part of a continuation of the Northern Rail Trail.

== Description and history ==
The Stone Arch Underpass is located in western Lebanon, on Glen Road, a rural-industrial route paralleling the Mascoma River, which flows to its south. The river is also roughly paralleled by the former right-of-way of the railroad. The underpass is an architecturally distinctive and unusual construction, oriented in a roughly east–west orientation. The arch of the bridge is 12 feet (3.7 m) high, 18 feet (5.5 m) wide, and 12.5 feet (3.8 m) deep. The bridge is faced with roughly cut granite blocks of irregular size, with voussoir stones 1.5 feet (0.46 m) wide and 2.5 feet (0.76 m) high forming the arch. Modern metal tie rods have been added to the arch, and the bridge is capped in concrete, which provides the foundation for the rail bed. The total length of the bridge is about 60 feet (18 m). The arch is narrow enough that there is room for only a single lane of traffic.

The Northern Railroad was incorporated in 1844, and began service in 1848 between Concord, New Hampshire and White River Junction, Vermont. This underpass was built as part of the construction of that service. While no detailed records indicate who designed it, it may have been the work of the railroad's chief engineer, H. R. Campbell.

== See also ==
- National Register of Historic Places listings in Grafton County, New Hampshire
- List of bridges on the National Register of Historic Places in New Hampshire
