= Amos Chase House and Mill =

Historic house in New Hampshire, United States

- U.S. National Register of Historic Places
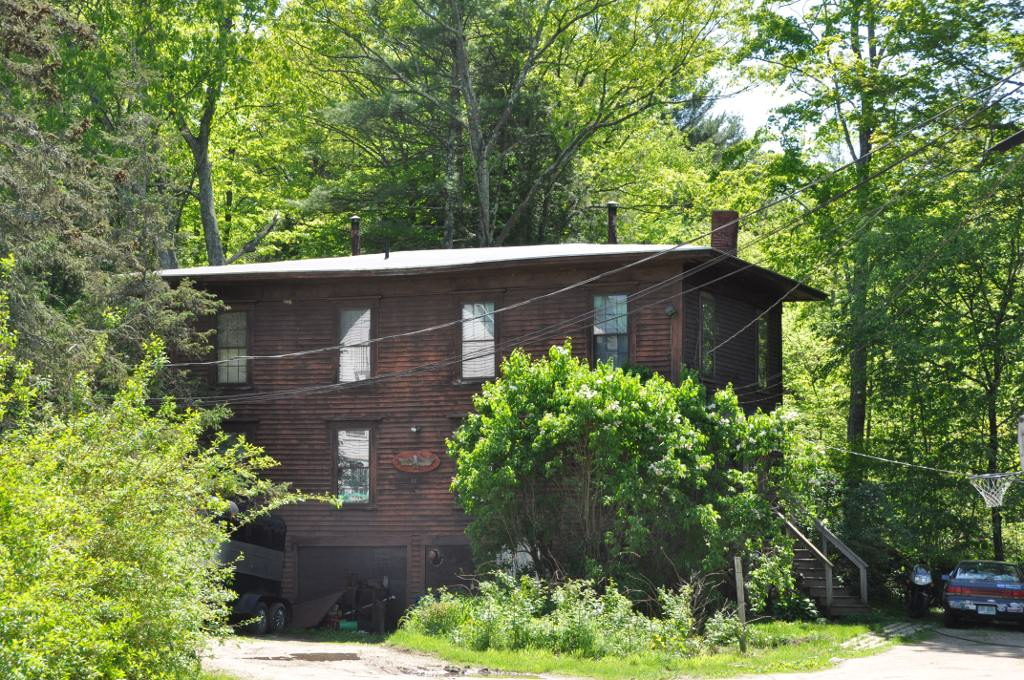

- Location within New Hampshire Location within the United States
- Location: NH 114 W side, 1/8 mi. S of jct. with NH 77, Weare, New Hampshire
- Coordinates: 43°6′32″N 71°45′1″W
- Area: 2.4 acres (0.97 ha)
- Built: 1836
- Architectural style: Greek Revival, Mill
- NRHP reference No.: 92000155
- Added to NRHP: March 12, 1992

The Amos Chase House and Mill are a historic property on New Hampshire Route 114, just south of the Piscataquog River in Weare, New Hampshire. The mill, built about 1849, is the last 19th-century mill standing in Weare, and the house, built about 1836, is a good example of vernacular Greek Revival architecture. The property was listed on the National Register of Historic Places in 1992.

== Description and history ==
The Amos Chase House and Mill are located in northern Weare, on the west side of New Hampshire 114 just south of its crossing of the Piscataquog River. The house is oriented facing the road, while the mill is behind it, on the bank of the river. The house is a 2½-story Greek Revival structure, with a gabled roof and clapboarded exterior. It has two similar five-bay facades (southeast and northeast) with central entries framed by pilasters and topped by architraves. The adjacent mill building is also a wood-frame structure, with a flat roof and clapboarded exterior. Both buildings have seen only modest and superficial alteration since their construction. Elements of the raceways providing water to the mill are still in evidence outside the building, and a stone dam built by Amos Chase spans the river.

The mill is the only surviving 19th-century mill building in Weare, out of a cottage industry that once saw a dozen or more such buildings. The house was built about 1836 by Amos Chase, as was a mill. That mill burned in 1844; the present mill was built by Chase as a replacement a few years later. This mill was the only one in the town to survive the New England Hurricane of 1938, although its waterwheel was washed away. Amos Chase was a tool manufacturer, one of several members of a locally prominent family operating small mills in the town. His son later used the mill in the manufacture of baskets.

== See also ==
- National Register of Historic Places listings in Hillsborough County, New Hampshire
- New Hampshire Historical Marker No. 192: Piscataquog River Mill Sites
