= Pier Bridge =

- U.S. National Register of Historic Places
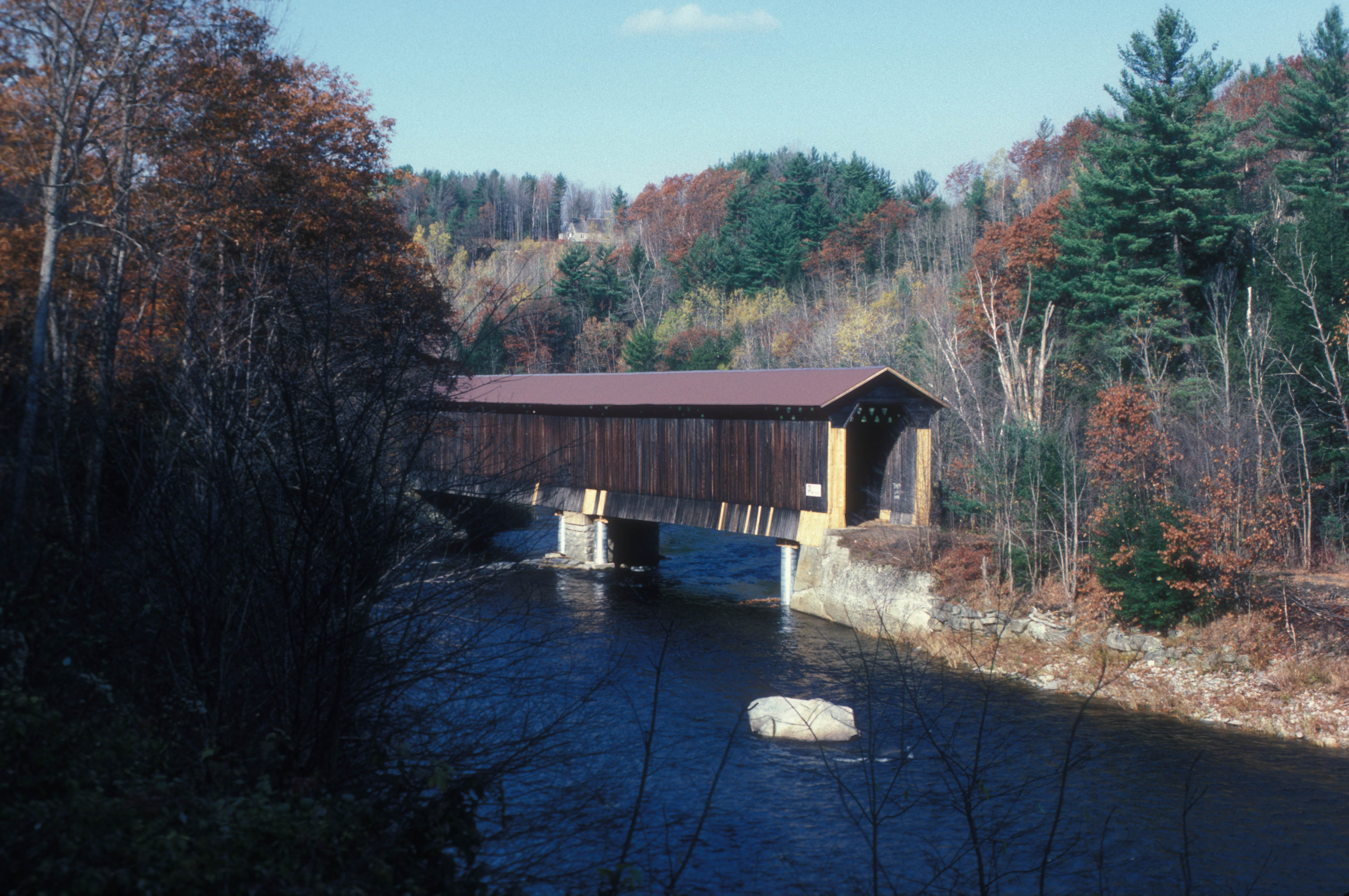

- Location within New Hampshire Location within the United States
- Location: Sugar River Trail east of Chandler, Newport, New Hampshire
- Coordinates: 43°21′43″N 72°14′31″W
- Area: 1 acre (0.40 ha)
- Built: 1907
- Built by: Boston and Maine Railroad
- Architectural style: Town lattice truss
- NRHP reference No.: 75000134
- Added to NRHP: June 10, 1975

The Pier Bridge is a historic covered bridge in Newport, New Hampshire. Originally built in 1907 to carry the Boston and Maine Railroad across the Sugar River, it now carries the multi-use Sugar River Trail, which was built on the abandoned right-of-way. It is one of a modest number of historic covered bridges in New Hampshire, and is named for the fact that it has a central pier. The bridge was listed on the National Register of Historic Places in 1975.

== Description and history ==
The Pier bridge is located about 0.5 miles (0.80 km) east of the former Chandler railroad station in western Newport, crossing the Sugar River at an angle with a roughly east–west orientation. It consists of two Town-Pratt lattice trusses, resting on granite abutments which have been capped by concrete, and a central pier of similar construction. The western span is 106 feet (32 m) long, the eastern one 121 feet (37 m). Its trusses consist of Town-style lattice trusses sandwiched between Pratt trusses. Elements of the truss and lattice networks are joined by a combination of wooden pegging and iron rods, with iron turnbuckles joining some of the chords. The exterior is finished in vertical board siding, with a ventilation gap of about 2 feet (0.61 m) between the siding and the roof.

The bridge was built in 1907 for the Boston and Maine Railroad. The railroad line it was built on dates to 1872, and was built by the Sugar River Railroad, which was merged into the B&M in 1887. The line was operated by the B&M until 1954 when it was sold to the Claremont & Concord Railway. The C&C last ran to Newport in 1977 and the line was subsequently abandoned. The bridge is one of two surviving railroad bridges on the line; the other is Wright's Bridge.

== See also ==
- National Register of Historic Places listings in Sullivan County, New Hampshire
- List of bridges on the National Register of Historic Places in New Hampshire
- List of New Hampshire covered bridges
