= List of bridges documented by the Historic American Engineering Record in New Hampshire =

This is a list of bridges documented by the Historic American Engineering Record in the U.S. state of New Hampshire.

== Bridges ==
Survey No.	Name (as assigned by HAER)	Status	Type	Built	Documented	Carries	Crosses	Location	County	Coordinates
NH-6	Bellows Falls Arch Bridge	Replaced	Steel arch	1905	1979		Connecticut River	North Walpole, New Hampshire, and Bellows Falls, Vermont	Cheshire County, New Hampshire, and Windham County, Vermont	43°08′17″N 72°26′54″W
NH-8	Cornish–Windsor Covered Bridge	Extant	Town lattice truss	1866	1984		Connecticut River	Cornish, New Hampshire, and Windsor, Vermont	Sullivan County, New Hampshire, and Windsor County, Vermont	43°28′26″N 72°23′02″W
NH-9	Cohas Brook Bridge	Replaced	Reinforced concrete open-spandrel arch	1929	1984	NH 28 (South Willow Street)	Cohas Brook	Manchester	Hillsborough	42°56′49″N 71°26′00″W
NH-10	Osgood Bridge	Replaced	Warren truss	1899	1986	Perch Pond Road	Beebe River	Campton Station	Grafton	43°49′17″N 71°37′54″W
NH-13	Walpole–Westminster Bridge	Replaced	Steel built-up girder	1911	1988	NH 123 / VT 123	Connecticut River	Walpole, New Hampshire, and Westminster, Vermont	Cheshire County, New Hampshire, and Windham County, Vermont	43°05′04″N 72°26′00″W
NH-14	Notre Dame Bridge	Replaced	Steel arch	1937	1988	Bridge Street	Merrimack River	Manchester	Hillsborough	42°59′39″N 71°28′10″W
NH-15	Durham Falls Bridge	Replaced	Steel rolled multi-beam	1907	1988	NH 108	Oyster River	Durham	Strafford	43°07′51″N 70°55′06″W
NH-16	Prescott Bridge	Replaced	Steel rolled multi-beam	1917	1989	Prescott Road	Lamprey River	Raymond	Rockingham	43°01′21″N 71°09′03″W
NH-17	Main Street Bridge	Replaced	Reinforced concrete Luten arch	1923	1989	Main Street	Israel River	Lancaster	Coos	44°29′17″N 71°34′10″W
NH-19	U.S. Route 4 Bridge	Replaced	Pratt truss	1940	1992	US 4	Mascoma River	Canaan	Grafton	43°38′37″N 72°06′47″W
NH-21	Branch River Bridge	Replaced	Reinforced concrete T-beam	1935	1993	NH 12 (Main Street)	The Branch	Keene	Cheshire	42°55′7″N 72°16′29″W
NH-23	Main Street Bridge	Replaced	Warren truss	1915	1995	NH 12 / NH 103 (Main Street)	Sugar River	Claremont	Sullivan	43°22′32″N 72°20′45″W
NH-24	Claremont Railway Bridge	Demolished	Warren truss	1903	1995	Claremont Railway	Sugar River	Claremont	Sullivan	43°22′32″N 72°20′45″W
NH-25	Elm Street Sluiceway	Extant	Culvert	1813	1995	Elm Street	Mill sluiceway	Claremont	Sullivan	43°22′34″N 72°20′45″W
NH-26	Colonel Alexander Scammell Memorial Bridge	Replaced	Strauss bascule	1935	1996	US 4	Bellamy River	Dover	Strafford	43°07′45″N 70°50′55″W
NH-27	Kelleyville Bridge	Replaced	Reinforced concrete open-spandrel arch	1933	1995	NH 11 / NH 103	Sugar River	Newport	Sullivan	43°21′44″N 72°13′30″W
NH-28	Manchester Street Bridge	Replaced	Parker truss	1933	1996	US 3 (Manchester Street)	Merrimack River	Concord	Merrimack	43°11′35″N 71°31′26″W
NH-29	Water Street Bridge	Replaced	Steel built-up girder	1936	1996	US 3 (Water Street)	Boston and Maine Railroad	Concord	Merrimack	43°11′47″N 71°31′46″W
NH-30	Barnstead Bridge	Replaced	Reinforced concrete rigid frame	1935	1997	NH 107 (Barnstead Road)	Suncook River	Pittsfield	Merrimack	43°18′26″N 71°19′21″W
NH-31	Edna Dean Proctor Bridge	Extant	Reinforced concrete closed-spandrel arch	1939	1997	NH 114	Contoocook River	Henniker	Merrimack	43°10′44″N 71°49′19″W
NH-33	Bath–Haverhill Bridge	Extant	Town lattice truss	1829	2003	NH 135 (Ammonoosuc Street) (former)	Ammonoosuc River	Woodsville and Bath	Grafton	44°09′17″N 72°02′11″W
NH-34	Bath Bridge	Extant	Burr truss	1832	2003	Lisbon Road	Ammonoosuc River	Bath	Grafton	44°10′01″N 71°58′02″W
NH-35	Wright's Bridge	Extant	Town lattice truss	1906	2003	Concord and Claremont Railroad	Sugar River	Claremont	Sullivan	43°21′32″N 72°15′33″W
NH-36	Sulphite Railroad Bridge	Abandoned	Pratt truss	1896	2003	Boston and Maine Railroad	Winnipesaukee River	Franklin	Merrimack	43°26′42″N 71°38′07″W
NH-38	Contoocook Railroad Bridge	Extant	Town lattice truss	1889	2003	Concord and Claremont Railroad	Contoocook River	Hopkinton	Merrimack	43°13′23″N 71°42′50″W
NH-39	Clark's Bridge	Extant	Howe truss	1904	2003	White Mountain Central Railroad	Pemigewasset River	Lincoln	Grafton	44°03′6″N 71°41′16″W
NH-40	Kenyon Bridge	Extant	King post truss	1882	2003	Town House Road	Mill Brook	Cornish	Sullivan	43°27′47″N 72°21′12″W
NH-41	Honeymoon Bridge	Extant	Paddleford truss	1876	2003	NH 16A	Ellis River	Jackson	Carroll	44°08′30″N 71°11′11″W
NH-42	Hancock–Greenfield Bridge	Extant	Pratt truss	1937	2003	Forest Road	Contoocook River	Hancock and Greenfield	Hillsborough	42°57′24″N 71°56′05″W
NH-43	Livermore Bridge	Abandoned	Town lattice truss	1937	2003	Russell Hill Road (former)	Blood Brook	Wilton	Hillsborough	42°49′46″N 71°46′42″W
NH-44	Rollins Farm Bridge	Abandoned	Howe truss	1917	2003	Ham Road	Boston and Maine Railroad	Rollinsford	Strafford	43°13′23″N 70°51′07″W
NH-45	Mechanic Street Bridge	Extant	Paddleford truss	1862	2004	Mechanic Street	Israel River	Lancaster	Coos	44°29′13″N 71°33′51″W
NH-48	Boston and Maine Railroad, Berlin Branch Bridge No. 148.81	Rehabilitated	Howe truss	1918	2009	Boston and Maine Railroad, Berlin Branch	Moose Brook	Gorham	Coos	44°24′2″N 71°12′27″W
NH-49	Boston and Maine Railroad, Berlin Branch Bridge No. 143.06	Rehabilitated	Howe truss	1918	2009	Boston and Maine Railroad, Berlin Branch	Snyder Brook	Randolph	Coos	44°22′16″N 71°17′07″W
NH-50	Whittier Bridge	Bypassed	Paddleford truss	1870	2009	NH 25 (Nudd Road) (former)	Bearcamp River	Ossipee	Carroll	43°49′20″N 71°12′43″W
NH-52	Sarah Mildred Long Bridge	Replaced	Vertical-lift bridge	1940	2012	US 1 Byp. and Portsmouth Naval Shipyard railroad	Piscataqua River	Portsmouth, New Hampshire, and Kittery, Maine	Rockingham County, New Hampshire, and York County, Maine	43°05′09″N 70°45′39″W
