= List of New Hampshire historical markers (176–200) =

- «151–175 201–225»

This page is one of a series of pages that list New Hampshire historical markers. The text of each marker is provided within its entry.

Contents
No.	Title	Location	Coordinates
176	Abbott Bridge	Pelham	42.72684°N 71.31926°W
177	Charlestown, New Hampshire Home Town of Carlton E. "Pudge" Fisk	Charlestown	43.23214°N 72.42348°W
178	New Hampshire's Last Soldier of the Revolution	Antrim	43.02967°N 71.93807°W
179	Smith Bridge	Plymouth	43.7756°N 71.73974°W
180	Rockingham Memorial	Brentwood	42.99055°N 71.03989°W
181	First New Hampshire Turnpike	Northwood	43.22336°N 71.25413°W
182	Lighting up Rural New Hampshire	Lempster	43.23872°N 72.21009°W
183	First Church Building in Deerfield	Deerfield	43.10581°N 71.24399°W
184	Turkey Pond – 1938 Hurricane	Concord	43.1689°N 71.58274°W
185	Willowdale Settlement	Littleton	44.27895°N 71.81139°W
186	Sawyer's Rock	Hart's Location	44.0759°N 71.32781°W
187	Suncook Village	Pembroke	43.13168°N 71.45269°W
188	Historic Handshake	Claremont	43.3629°N 72.35326°W
189	Stream Gaging in New Hampshire	Plymouth	43.75971°N 71.68661°W
190	Haverhill–Bath Bridge	Haverhill	44.15304°N 72.03694°W
191	Arched Bridge	Rochester	43.3051°N 70.97959°W
192	Piscataquog River Mill Sites	Weare	43.10946°N 71.75019°W
193	Old Allenstown Meeting House / Meeting House Burying Ground	Allenstown	43.1605°N 71.38098°W
194	Wentworth–Coolidge Mansion	Portsmouth	43.06097°N 70.75394°W
195	Contoocook Railroad Bridge and Depot	Hopkinton	43.22327°N 71.71425°W
196	Blair Bridge	Campton	43.81026°N 71.66671°W
197	Jonathan "Jocky" Fogg, Patriot	Pittsfield	43.30545°N 71.32925°W
198	Alderbrook	Bethlehem	44.32716°N 71.70194°W
199	Major Andrew McClary	Epsom	43.22321°N 71.33409°W
200	Wildwood	Easton	44.092°N 71.8262°W
Notes • References • External links

== Markers 176 to 200 ==
=== 176. Abbott Bridge ===
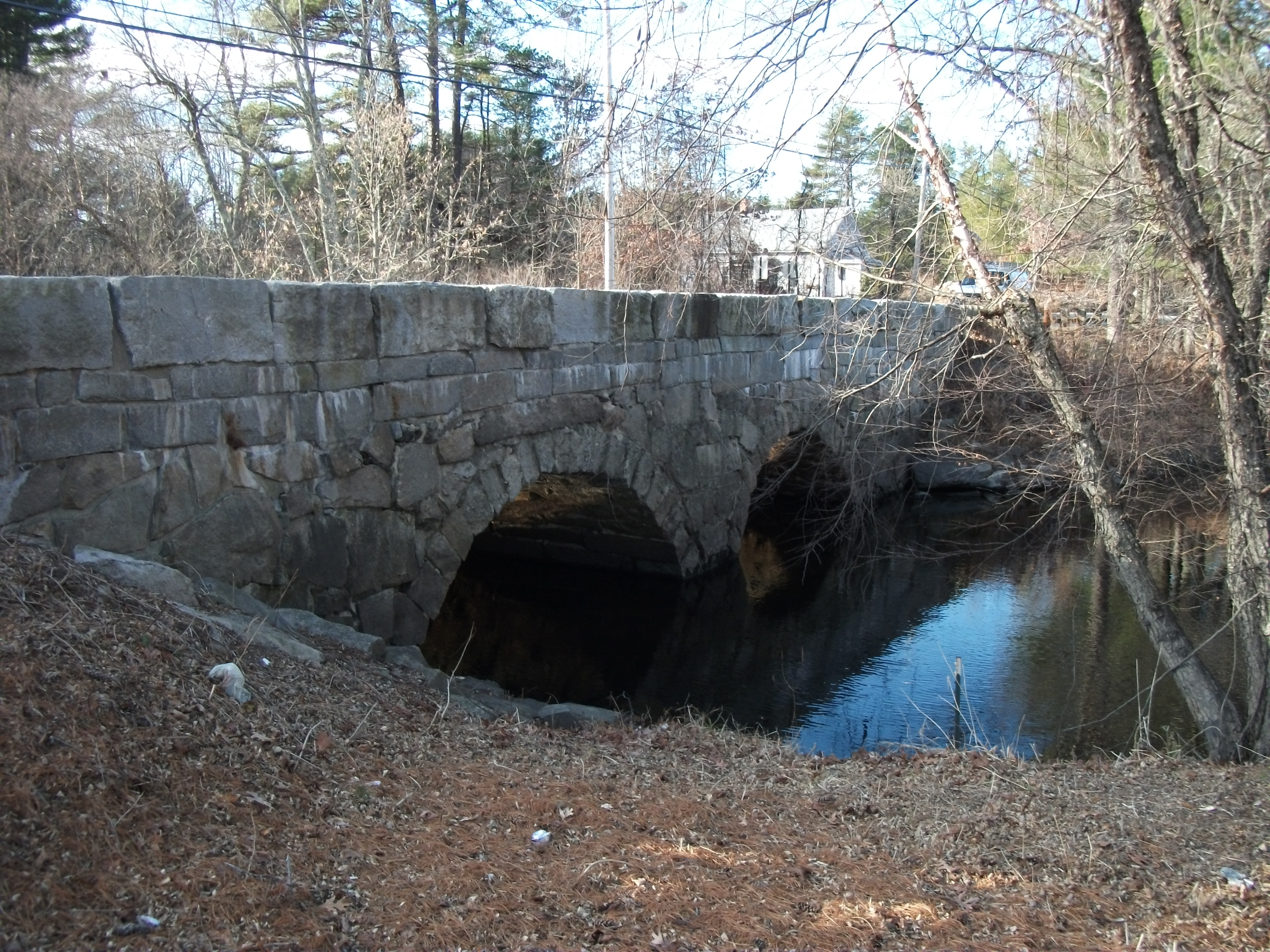
Abbot Bridge crossing Beaver Brook

Town of Pelham

"Built in 1837, without mortar and sustained solely by expert shaping of its arched stones, it is the oldest double-arched stone bridge to survive in New Hampshire. Located near the Uriah Abbott home, it was also called the South Bridge. It is attributed to mason Benjamin F. Simpson (born 1799), who later built two other bridges in town. (Restored in 1998)"

=== 177. Charlestown, New Hampshire Home Town of Carlton E. "Pudge" Fisk ===
Town of Charlestown

"Carlton attended Charlestown schools, starring in basketball, soccer and baseball at Charlestown High School. He played professional baseball for the Boston Red Sox and the Chicago White Sox from 1969 to 1993, where he set several records including most home runs by a catcher and most games caught. (Note: Fisk's records for home runs by a catcher and games caught have been surpassed by Mike Piazza and Iván Rodríguez, respectively.) He was honored as the first ever unanimous choice Rookie of the Year in 1972. He was voted to the American League All Star team eleven times. Carlton was inducted into the Baseball Hall of Fame in 2000."

=== 178. New Hampshire's Last Soldier of the Revolution ===
Town of Antrim

"Samuel Downing, born in Newburyport MA in 1764, (Note: Other sources give Samuel Downing's year of birth as 1761.) was enticed to Antrim while still a boy to be an apprentice of Robert Aiken, a Scots-Irish spinning wheel maker. In 1780 Samuel ran away to Hopkinton NH to enlist in the Continental Army; refused, he went to Charlestown NH where he joined the 2nd NH Regiment. He served to the end of the war, returned to Antrim and became a respected citizen. In 1794 he emigrated to Edinburg NY where he settled permanently. At his death in 1867 he was the oldest recorded pensioner of the Revolution, although two others were enrolled later."

=== 179. Smith Bridge ===
Town of Plymouth

"Named for local farmer Jacob Smith, the first bridge at this site was begun before 1786 and completed with the aid of a lottery authorized in that year. In 1850, contractor Harmon Marcy of Littleton, N.H. built a new bridge at a cost of about $2,700, using a pre-stressed wooden truss patented by Col. Stephen Harriman Long (1784-1864) of Hopkinton, N.H. After an arsonist burned the 143-year-old span in 1993, the state constructed this two-lane bridge. Built with glue-laminated timbers and arches at a cost of $3.3 million and dedicated in 2001, the new span was designed to bear the same loads as interstate highway bridges."

=== 180. Rockingham Memorial ===
Town of Brentwood

"Brentwood's meetinghouse could not hold the nearly 2,000 Federalists who gathered for the Friends of Peace rally here on August 5, 1812. So 'under the great canopy of Heaven,' Daniel Webster read his 'Rockingham Memorial,' opposing the United States' entry into the War of 1812. (Note: See also Federalist Party#Opposition to the War of 1812, and a summary of the Rockingham Memorial here.) Although he had not held any previous elective office, before the meeting ended Webster was chosen to run for Congress on the Peace Ticket. He won the election and became a national figure."

=== 181. First New Hampshire Turnpike ===
Town of Northwood

"Extending 36 miles from Piscataqua Bridge in Durham to the Merrimack River in East Concord, this highway was originally a toll road. The first of more than 80 New Hampshire turnpikes built by private corporations in the nineteenth century, (Note: See also List of turnpikes in New Hampshire.) this was the only one connecting Portsmouth, the state's seaport, with the interior settlements. Chartered in 1796, the corporation began to build the road about 1801. Much of the present Route 4 follows the four rod (66 foot) right-of-way of this first turnpike."

=== 182. Lighting up Rural New Hampshire ===
Town of Lempster

"On nearby Allen Road on December 4, 1939, the New Hampshire Electric Cooperative set its first utility pole, an important event in bringing electric service to the farms, mills, and homes of the New Hampshire countryside. A group of citizens formed the Cooperative and, with funding from the federal Rural Electrification Administration (REA), built and maintained its own power lines. By 2001, the member-owned Cooperative served more than 70,000 members and remained the state's only electric cooperative."

=== 183. First Church Building in Deerfield ===
Town of Deerfield

"Deerfield's first house of worship was erected near this spot in 1770 by the Baptists. They used this building until about 1818, when they constructed a new church at Deerfield Center. The Baptists' first preacher, Eliphalet Smith, was ordained in 1770. The Deerfield church was one of the earliest Baptist Groups to be formed in New Hampshire."

=== 184. Turkey Pond – 1938 Hurricane ===
City of Concord

"The Great Hurricane of 1938 devastated New England's forests. As a result, Turkey Pond was used to store almost 12 million board feet (Note: 12 million board feet is equivalent to 1 million cubic feet (28,000 m^{3}).) of salvaged white pine logs, more than anywhere in New England. From 1941 to 1943, the H.S. Durant mill, operating on this site, sawed most of the volume floating in Turkey Pond. On the pond's north side, the U.S. Forest Service constructed a sawmill that was operated by a group of local women. Led by sawfiler Laura Willey, the women proved themselves to be an exemplary crew. 'Snow, rain, or sub-zero weather never slowed them up,' wrote one Forest Service manager."

=== 185. Willowdale Settlement ===
Town of Littleton

"Willowdale was established around a sawmill that was built in 1812. The village thrived because sawmills, gristmills, and a factory producing sawmill machinery were powered by the Ammonoosuc River. After the Littleton Lumber Company opened in 1870, the village grew rapidly to include stores, a post office, a school, railroad siding, and a hall. The company employed as many as 60 workers and produced 3 to 6 million board feet (Note: 3 to 6 million board feet is equivalent to one-quarter to one-half million cubic feet (7,100 to 14,200 m^{3}).) yearly until fire destroyed it in 1898. (Note: This fire was reported in The Boston Globe of May 25, 1898.) The village never recovered and slowly dwindled away until it disappeared altogether, a fate suffered by other 19th century mill villages."

=== 186. Sawyer's Rock ===
Town of Hart's Location

"In 1771, Timothy Nash of Lancaster and Benjamin Sawyer of Conway made a bargain with Governor John Wentworth to bring a horse through Crawford Notch in order to prove the route's commercial value. The pair succeeded by dragging and lowering the animal down rock faces. Sawyer's Rock is said to be the last obstacle they encountered before reaching the Bartlett intervales. Nash and Sawyer were rewarded with a 2,184 acre parcel at the northern end of the Notch. Sawyer's Rock symbolizes the determination and foresight that helped open and develop trade and travel into the White Mountains Region."

=== 187. Suncook Village ===
Town of Pembroke

"The waters of Suncook River were harnessed in the 1730s, eventually powering saw and grist mills, forge shops, and paper mills. The first cotton factory, owned by Major Caleb Stark, was built here in 1811. By 1900, Pembroke Mill, Webster Mill, and China Mill employed more than 1,500 workers, mostly recruited from the Province of Quebec, to make 35 million yards of cotton cloth each year. Suncook's commercial center, built of native brick and granite, attained its present appearance by 1886. It is one of the best-preserved small manufacturing villages in New Hampshire."

=== 188. Historic Handshake ===
City of Claremont

"On June 11, 1995, President William Jefferson Clinton and Speaker of the House Newt Gingrich met at the Invitation of the Congress of Claremont Senior Citizens, Inc. to debate issues affecting senior citizens. During the debate, the political foes shook hands and pledged to create a bi-partisan commission to study federal limits on lobbying and the financing of election campaigns. This famous 'handshake' on campaign finance reform was carried live on television and received widespread media coverage including front page attention in newspapers nationwide."

=== 189. Stream Gaging in New Hampshire ===
Town of Plymouth

"This is the site of the longest continuous stream gaging in New Hampshire. Daily measurement of the level of the Pemigewasset River was begun here in 1886 by the Locks and Canals Company of Lowell, Massachusetts, which controlled flowage in the Merrimack River and its headwaters. In 1903, with funding from the State of New Hampshire, the U.S. Geological Survey began to measure the discharge of the river to determine available waterpower and the effects of White Mountain deforestation. The original gage was on the abutment of a covered bridge at this site. The concrete gaging station, just downstream, dates from 1926."

=== 190. Haverhill–Bath Bridge ===
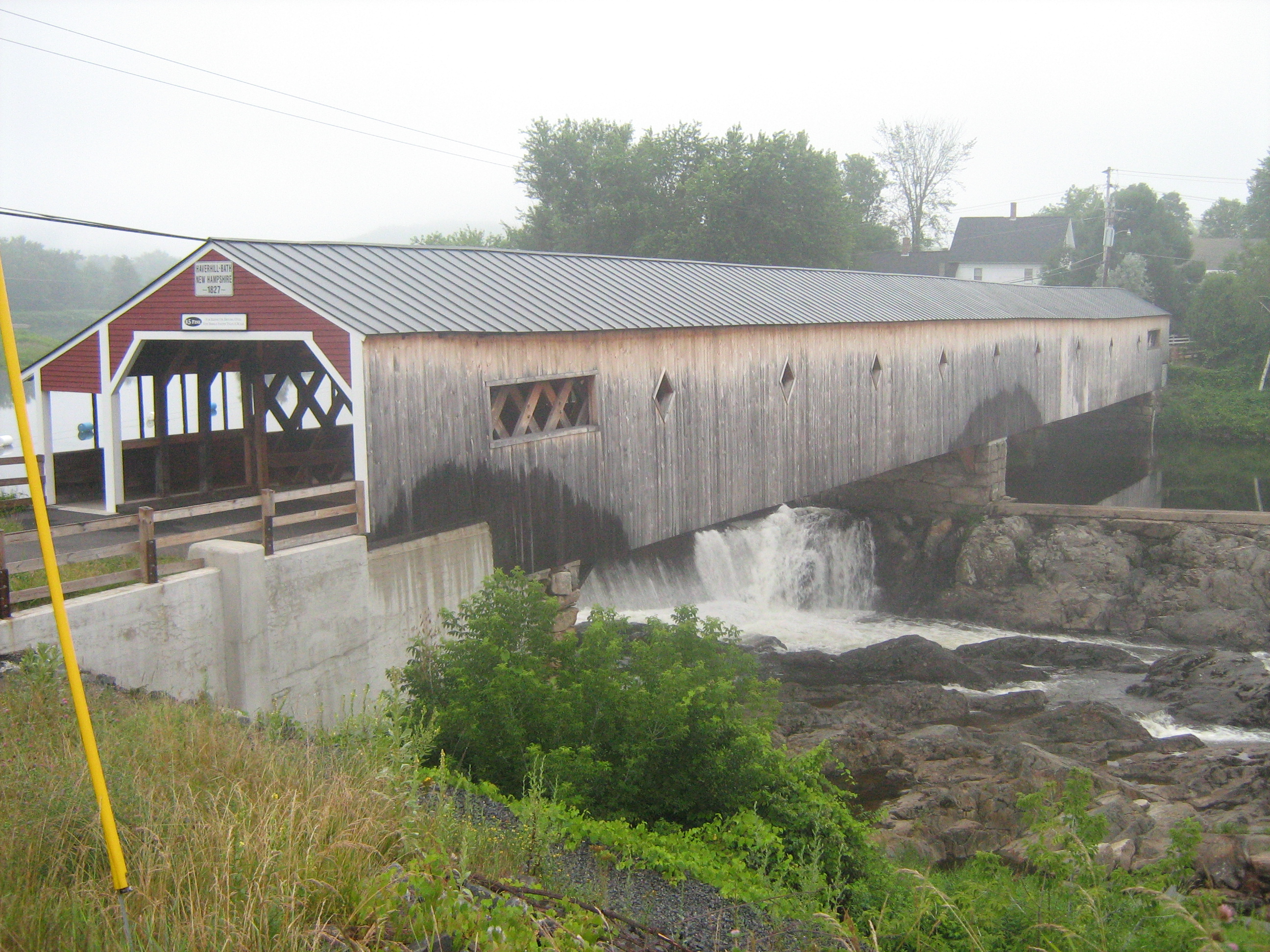
Haverhill–Bath Bridge, after its 2004 restoration

Town of Haverhill

"Constructed in 1829 by the towns of Bath and Haverhill at a cost of about $2,400, this is one of the oldest covered bridges in the United States. Built with 3-by-10-inch planks that were probably sawn at an adjacent mill, the span is the earliest surviving example of the lattice bridge truss that was patented in 1820 by Connecticut architect Ithiel Town (1784-1844). The bridge was strengthened with laminated wooden arches in 1921-22, and the upstream sidewalk was added at about the same time. The 256-foot-long bridge carried traffic for 170 years before being bypassed in 1999."

=== 191. Arched Bridge ===
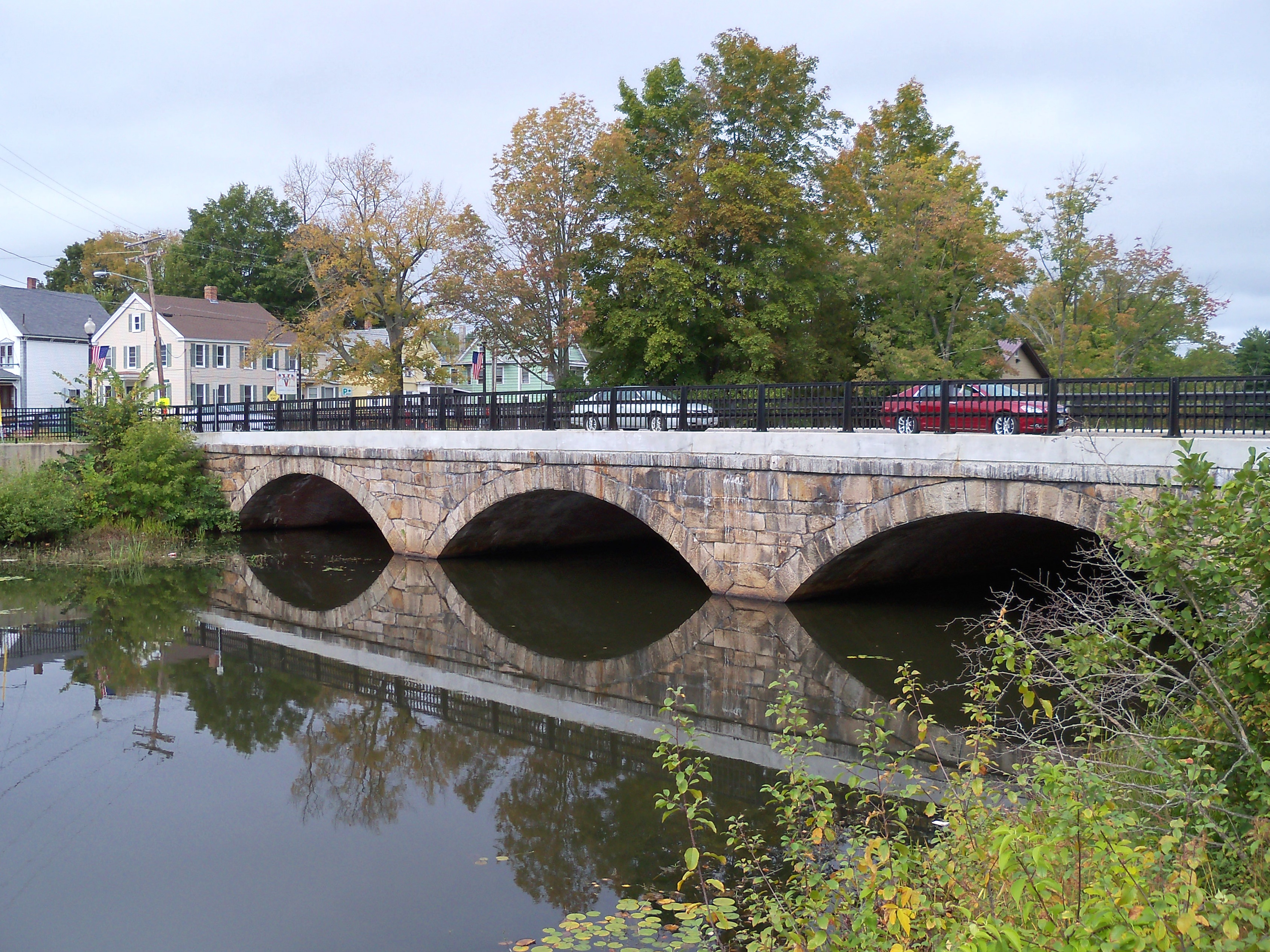
Rochester arched bridge over the Cocheco River

City of Rochester

"Designed and built between 1881 and 1883 by Silas Hussey, Jr. (1828-1913), this bridge is unique in New Hampshire in having heavy brick arches faced with split granite. Its fifty-foot width was exceptional for the time. Hussey was a local quarryman and stonecutter who also designed Rochester's Civil War monument. He built the three-arched bridge for a contract price of $13,800, subcontracting the bricklaying to Henry J. Wilkinson (1848-1899) of Rochester, a British-born mason."

=== 192. Piscataquog River Mill Sites ===
Town of Weare

"Twenty-two mills in Weare, located along the Piscataquog River, were the economic life-blood of the town from 1752-1979. The mills furnished employment, goods, and services locally and afar. They manufactured toys, textiles, wood and metal products, hosiery and shoes. Many of the mills were destroyed by the hurricane and flood of 1938. The Amos Chase Mill, listed in the National Register of Historic Places, is the only Mill building to survive into the 21st century."

=== 193. Old Allenstown Meeting House / Meeting House Burying Ground ===
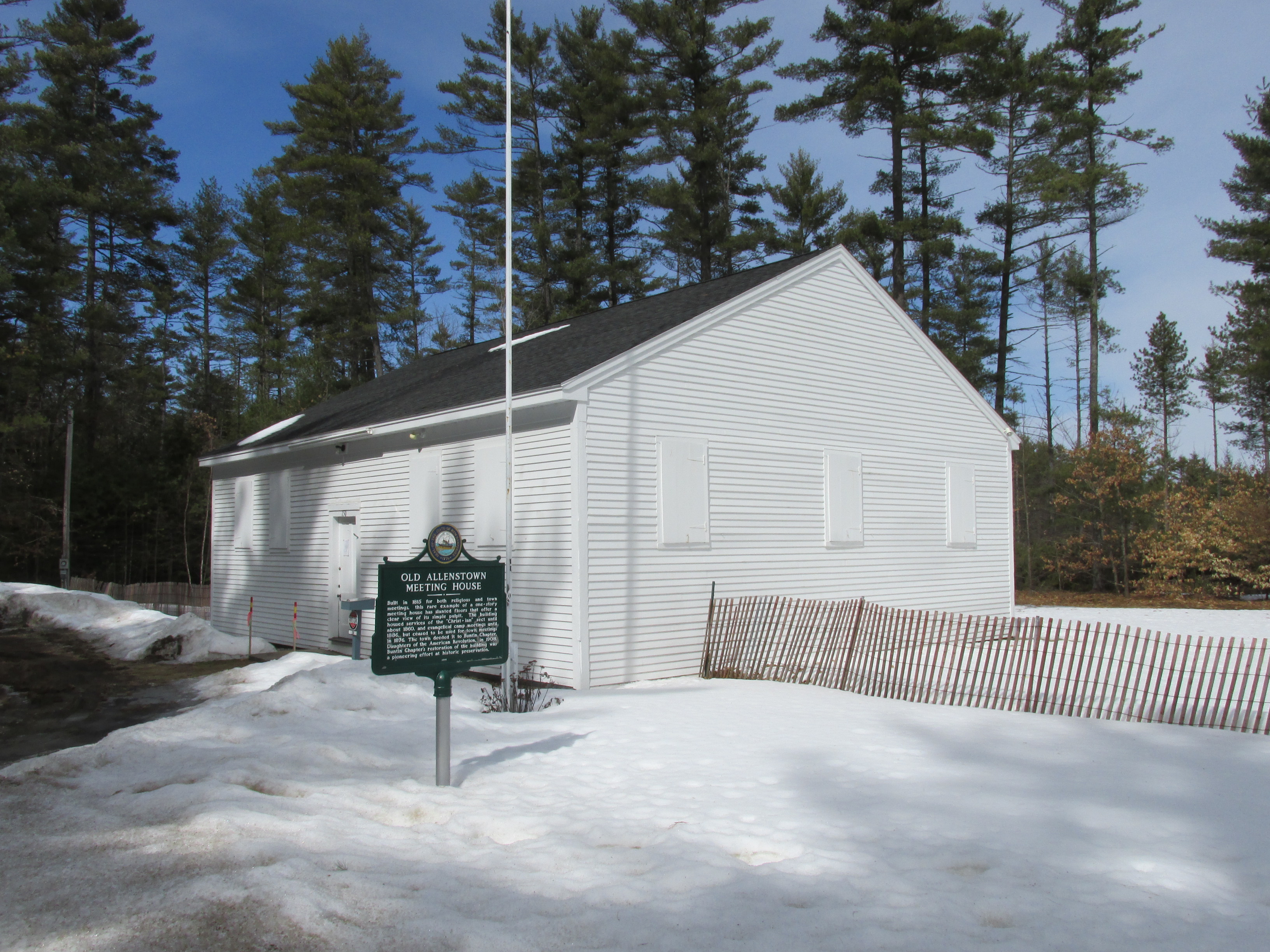
Allenstown Meeting House

Town of Allenstown

"Built in 1815 for both religious and town meetings, this rare example of a one-story meeting house has slanted floors that offer a clear view of its simple pulpit. The building housed services of the 'Christ-ian' sect until about 1860, and evangelical camp meetings until 1886, but ceased to be used for town meetings in 1876. The town deeded it to Buntin Chapter, Daughters of the American Revolution, in 1908. Buntin Chapter's restoration of the building was a pioneering effort at historic preservation."

"The Old Burying Ground is enclosed within the stone walls across the road. Judge Hall Burgin donated land for a meeting house and burying ground about 1807, and both parcels have always been conveyed together. There are five known graves in the cemetery: Ede Hall Burgin; his wife, Elizabeth Burgin; two daughters of Jonathan Sargent; and John Critchett. In the early 1900s, two gravestones remained visible. Buntin Chapter, Daughters of the American Revolution, passed the property to the state in 1991, and the state deeded it back to the town in 2004."

=== 194. Wentworth–Coolidge Mansion ===
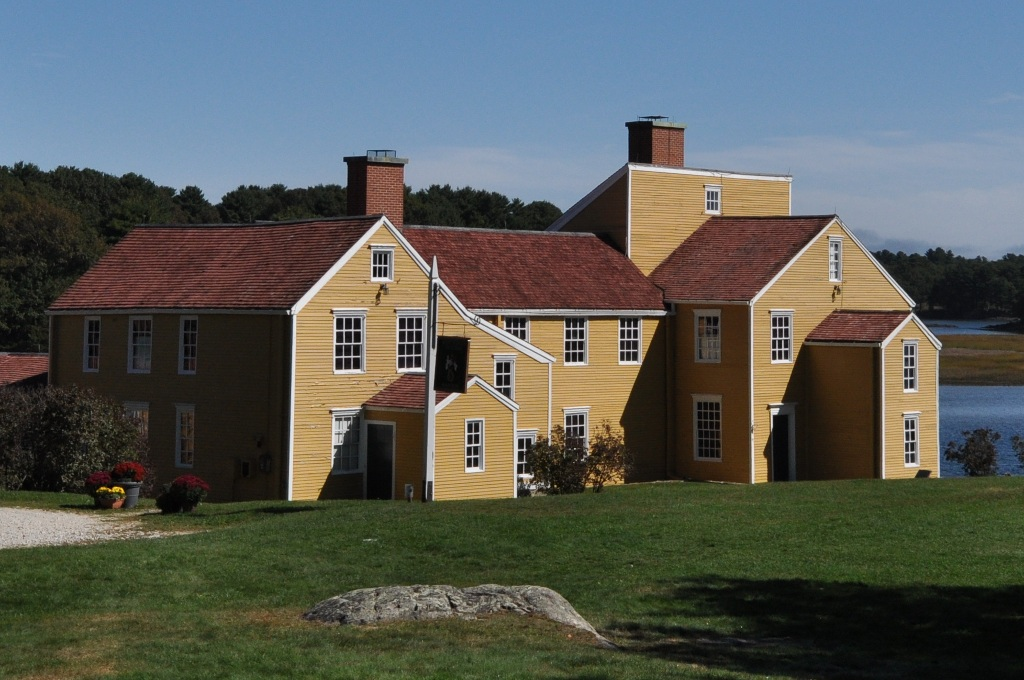
Wentworth–Coolidge Mansion

City of Portsmouth

"At the end of Little Harbor Road is the farm of Royal Governor Benning Wentworth (1696-1770). Appointed in 1741 by George II, Wentworth governed the province of New Hampshire for 25 years, promoting expansion as far west as Bennington, in present-day Vermont. The Cushing family acquired the farm in 1816, and by the 1840s began to show the mansion as one of America's first historic houses open to the public. In 1886, John Templeman Coolidge (1856-1945) of Boston purchased the site for a summer home. In 1954, his widow, Mary Abigail Parsons Coolidge, donated it to the state of New Hampshire."

=== 195. Contoocook Railroad Bridge and Depot ===
Town of Hopkinton

"Built in 1889 on the granite abutments of an older span, this is the world's oldest surviving covered railroad bridge. It was probably designed by Boston & Maine Railroad engineer Jonathan Parker Snow (1848-1933) and built by carpenter David Hazelton (1832-1908). Under Snow, the Boston & Maine utilized wooden bridges on its branch lines until after 1900, longer than any other major railroad. The nearby depot was built in 1850 on the earlier Concord & Claremont Railroad, which was acquired by the Boston & Maine in 1887."

=== 196. Blair Bridge ===
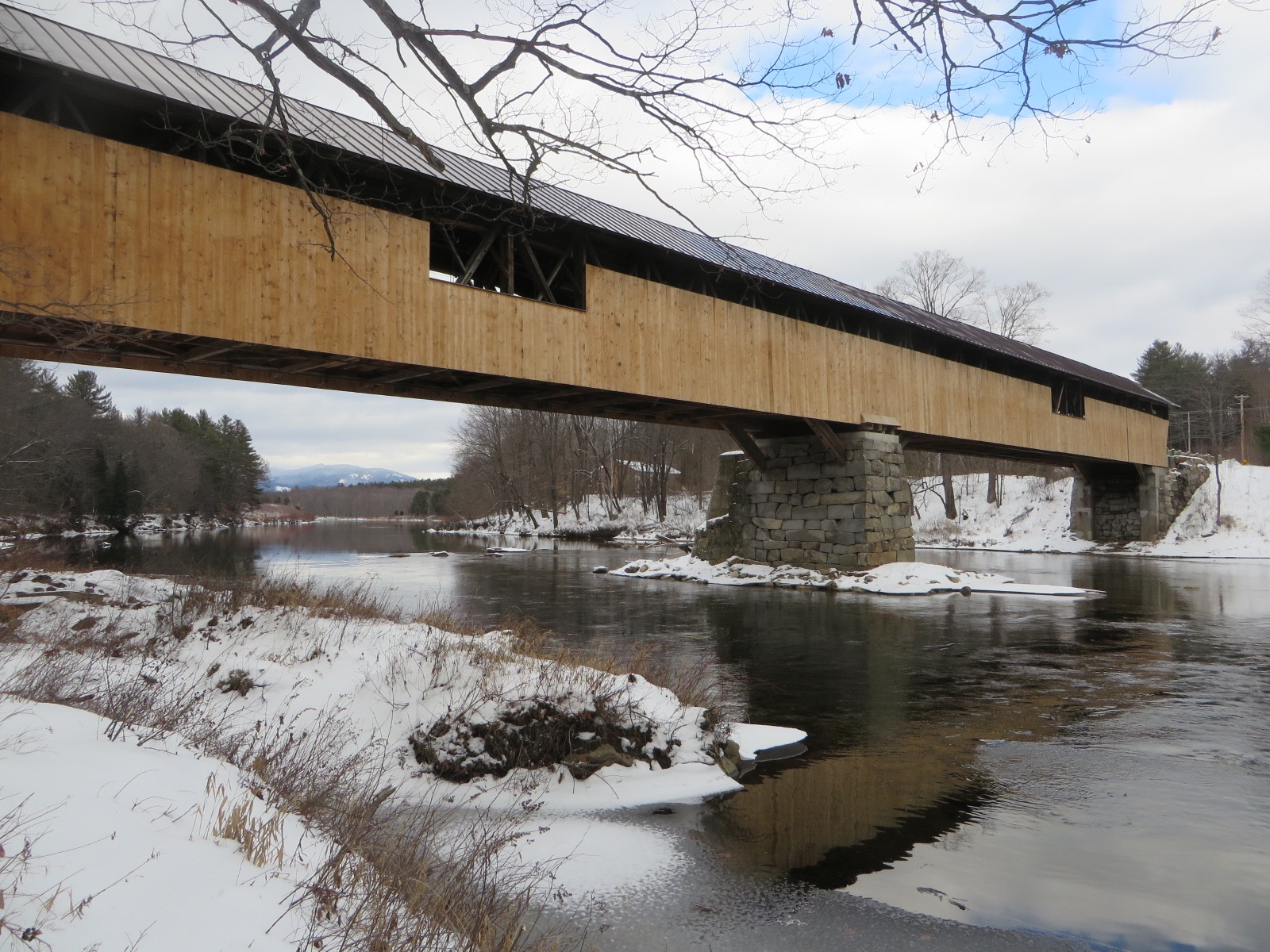
Blair Bridge

Town of Campton

"Hiram W. Merrill (1822-1898) of Plymouth, N. H., built this bridge in 1870 to replace a span of 1829 that had been burned by an arsonist. The bridge employs a truss design patented by Col. Stephen Harriman Long (1784-1864) of Hopkinton, N. H. It is New Hampshire's only surviving example of Long's patent to retain wedges at the lower chords by which the trusses were pre-stressed during construction, stiffening the bridge against the weight of traffic. Covered bridge expert Milton S. Graton (1908-1994) restored the structure in 1977."

=== 197. Jonathan "Jocky" Fogg, Patriot ===
Town of Pittsfield

"Jocky Fogg epitomizes the youth who suffered to defend our liberty during the Revolutionary War. Hearing about the clash at Lexington and Concord while planting peas at this site, he immediately marched to Cambridge and fought in the Battle of Bunker Hill. Fogg later survived the ill-fated winter march to Quebec under Benedict Arnold. Of the 1100 men who left, only half reached the city, cold and starved. Captured and imprisoned for nine months under deplorable conditions, Fogg returned to Pittsfield and married Sarah Cram, daughter of the town's founder."

=== 198. Alderbrook ===
Town of Bethlehem

"Alderbrook developed around a sawmill built by H.C. Libbey in 1844. The Village grew to include a post office, a dozen company-owned houses, a boarding house, school and railroad station. The mill employed as many as 40 to 60 men and cut as much as 3 to 5 million board feet (Note: 3 to 5 million board feet is equivalent to 0.250 to 0.417 million cubic feet (7,100 to 11,800 m^{3}).) each year of lumber, clapboards, lath and shingles. It was sold to a Portland company in July 1909 and was destroyed by fire five months later. The blaze was likely started by a spark from a freight engine. The mill was not rebuilt and the once productive hamlet disappeared as the company left for other tracts of timber."

=== 199. Major Andrew McClary ===
Town of Epsom

"Andrew McClary served in the famed Rogers Rangers. He participated in the December 1774 raids on the British Fort, William & Mary in New Castle, at which time powder and munitions were seized. Learning of the pending conflict at Bunker Hill while tilling his land just south of here he left his plow in the furrow in his haste to meet the challenge. McClary was named 2nd in command to Col. John Stark of the 1st N.H. Regiment. A British cannonball felled him as the battle ended, prompting the eulogy: 'His sun went down at noon on the day that ushered in our nation's birth'."

=== 200. Wildwood ===
Town of Easton

"In this area of Easton, once part of Landaff, and before that, Lincoln, the village of Wildwood once stood. Wildwood was a farming community in the early 1800s. Later, during the Great Depression, it hosted New Hampshire's first CCC camp. At the turn of the 20th century, Wildwood reached its peak of development. As a center for the 'slash and run' logging of Mount Moosilauke, Wildwood had a school, a post office, and sawmills. West of here was a dam used in the drives that moved logs down the Wild Ammonoosuc River, from the mountains to the mills."
