= Hancock–Greenfield Bridge =

- U.S. National Register of Historic Places
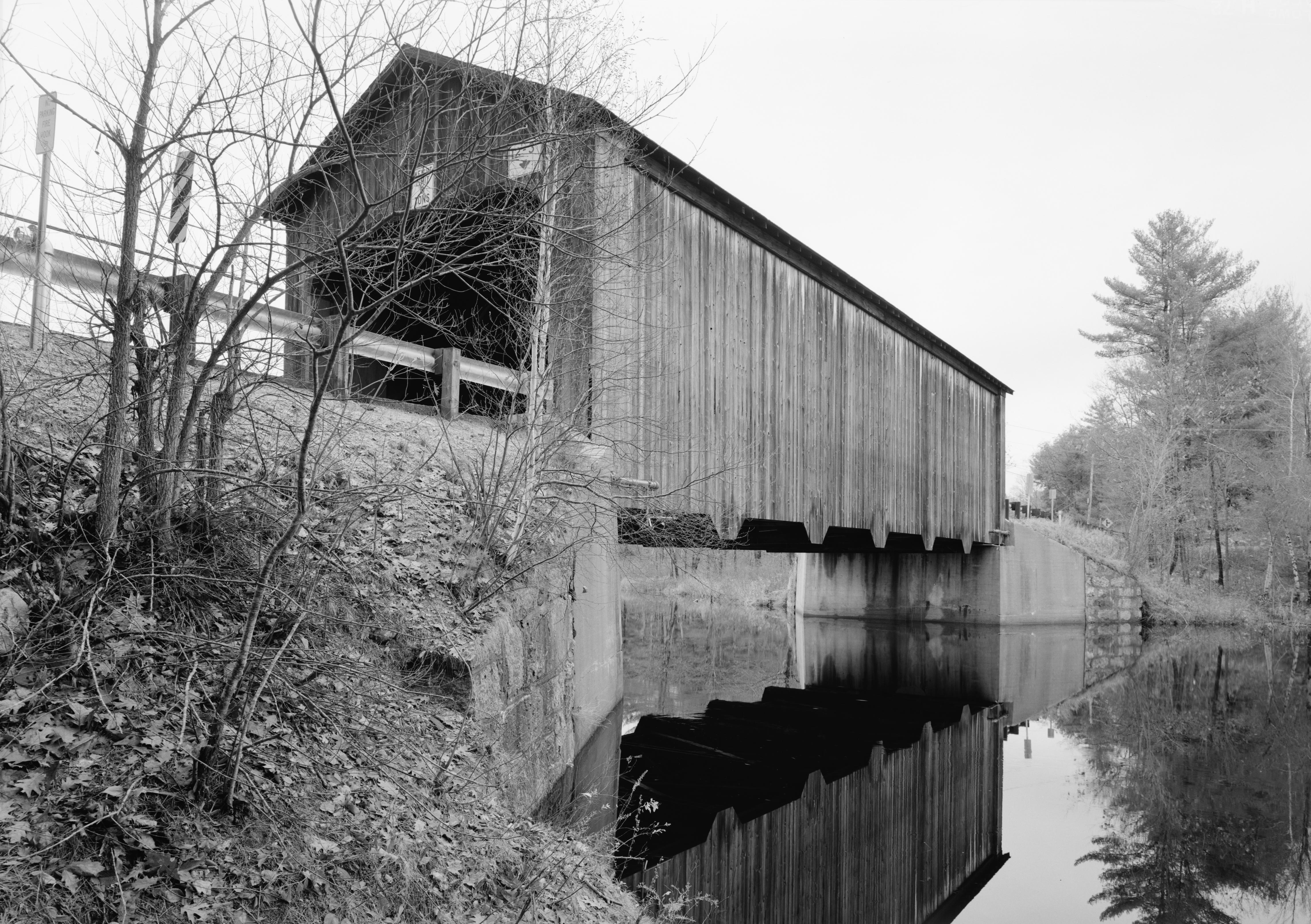
- Hancock–Greenfield Bridge, spanning Contoocook River, carrying Forest Road

- Location within New Hampshire Location within the United States
- Location: Forest Rd. over the Contoocook River, Greenfield and Hancock, New Hampshire
- Coordinates: 42°57′24″N 71°56′5″W
- Area: less than one acre
- Built: 1937
- Architect: John W. Childs
- Architectural style: Teco–Pratt timber truss
- NRHP reference No.: 81000071
- Added to NRHP: May 05, 1981

The Hancock–Greenfield Bridge is a historic covered bridge carrying Forest Road over the Contoocook River at the town line between Hancock and Greenfield, New Hampshire. The New Hampshire Department of Transportation covered bridge database refers to it as County Bridge. Built in 1937, it is the first wooden covered bridge in the northeastern United States to use modern engineering techniques (in this case, a Teco–Pratt truss). The bridge was listed on the National Register of Historic Places in 1981.

== Description and history ==
The Hancock–Greenfield Bridge carries Forest Road (historically known as Old County Road) over the Contoocook River, which forms the border between eastern Hancock and northwestern Greenfield. It is a single-span Teco–Pratt timber truss, 88 feet (27 m) long and 27 feet 2 inches (8.28 m) wide, with an internal clearance of 14 feet (4.3 m). The road bed is 20 feet (6.1 m) wide and carries two lanes of traffic. The bridge's roof is sheathed in asphalt, and its walls are finished in vertical board siding. The vertical load-bearing trusses are joined by a latticework web at both the ceiling and floor, effectively making the structure into a single box truss. The roadway is asphalt laid on horizontally placed timbers. All of its major interconnection points are reinforced by steel gussets, and crossing and connection points of the trusses are made with steel pins.

The bridge was built in 1937, replacing a Long-truss covered bridge built in 1852. That structure was extensively damaged by flooding in 1936. The Timber Engineering Company of Washington, DC, provided the interconnecting elements, which greatly strengthen the structure, based on plans it had first published in 1935. Construction of these types of bridges was generally supplanted by the more economical steel girder bridges after World War II.

== See also ==
- List of bridges documented by the Historic American Engineering Record in New Hampshire
- List of bridges on the National Register of Historic Places in New Hampshire
- List of New Hampshire covered bridges
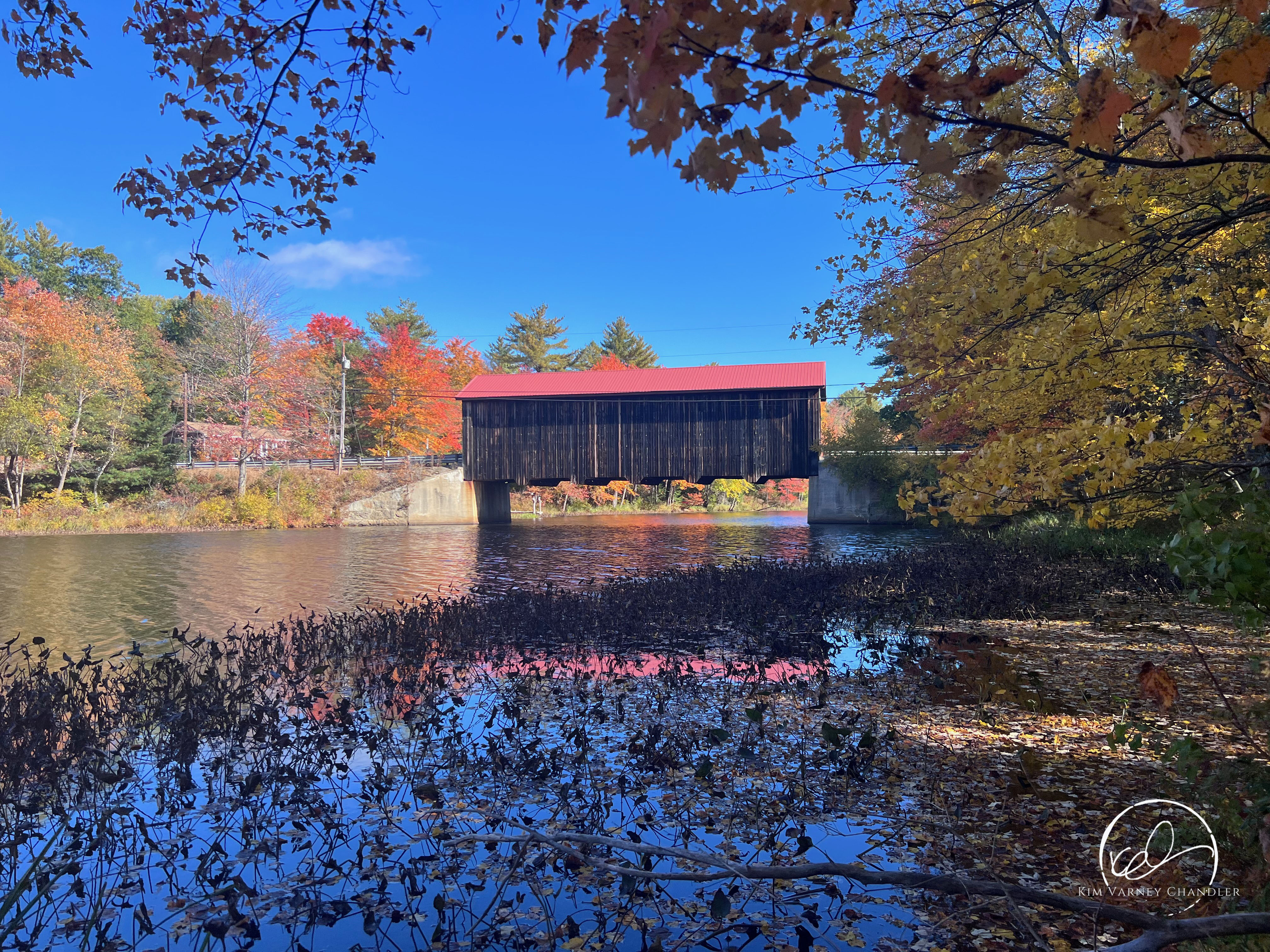
- Hancock-Greenfield Bridge, 2022
  National Register of Historic Places listings in Hillsborough County, New Hampshire
