= Meriden Bridge =

- U.S. National Register of Historic Places
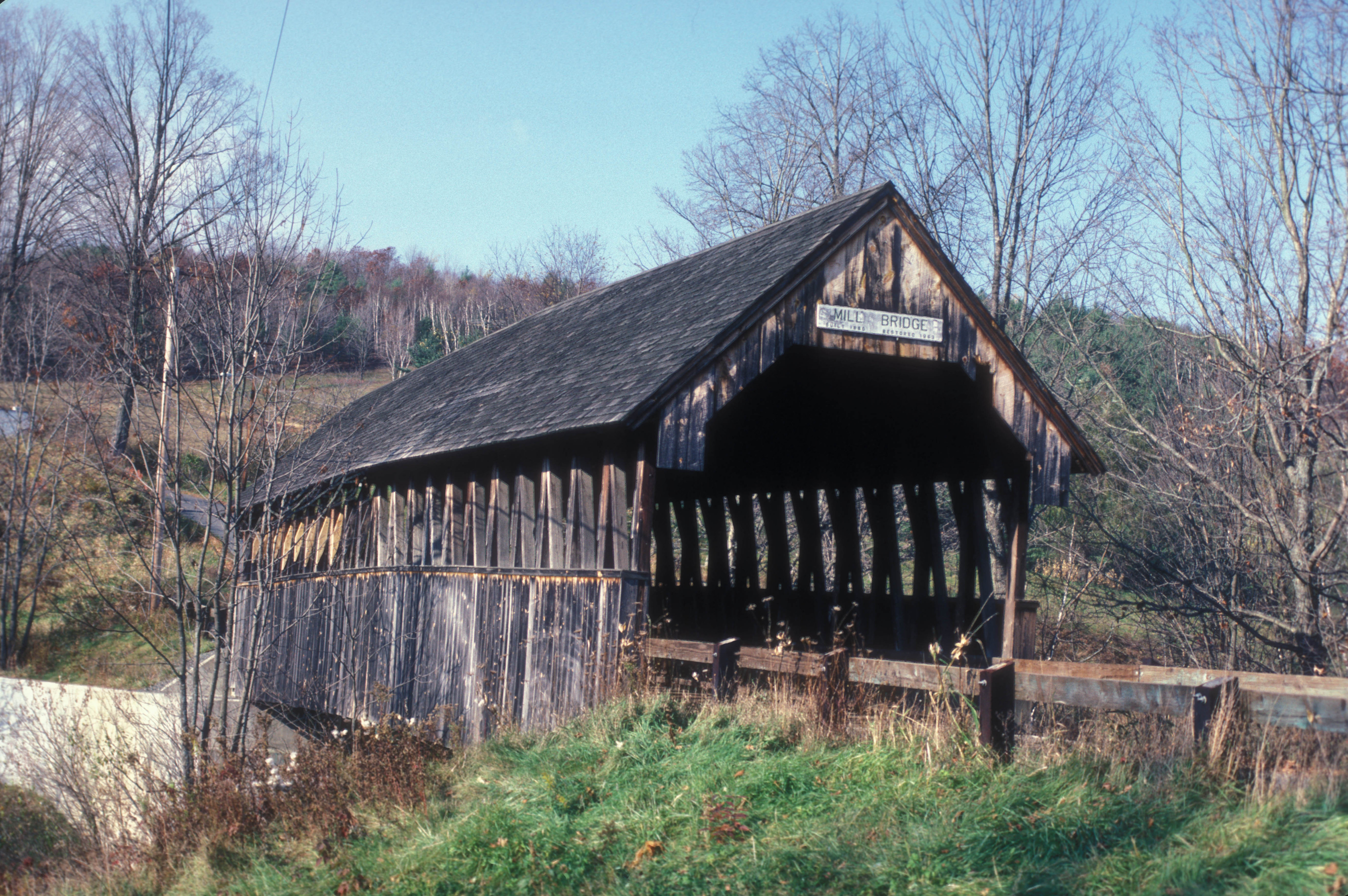

- Location within New Hampshire Location within the United States
- Location: Colby Mill Rd., Meriden, New Hampshire
- Coordinates: 43.553411°N 72.2657919°W
- Area: less than one acre
- Built: 1880
- Built by: James F. Tasker
- Architectural style: Multiple Kingpost Truss
- NRHP reference No.: 80000321
- Added to NRHP: August 27, 1980

The Meriden Bridge is a historic covered bridge in the Meriden area of Plainfield, New Hampshire. The bridge is a single span which carries Colby Hill Road over Bloods Brook, just west of a junction with Main Street and Willow Brook Road. Built about 1880, it is one of New Hampshire's few surviving 19th-century covered bridges. It was listed on the National Register of Historic Places in 1980.

== Description and history ==
The Meriden Bridge is located north of the village of Meriden on Colby Hill Road just west of Main Street. It is a multiple Kingpost truss design, 85 feet (26 m) long and 16 feet (4.9 m) wide. It has a road bed 14 feet (4.3 m) wide, carrying one lane of traffic. The lower third of the sides is shielded by vertical board siding (to a height of about 5 feet (1.5 m)), as are the top section of the portals. The trusses have 22 panels, each 36 inches (91 cm) wide, with the chords fastened to the posts by iron rods.

The bridge was built about 1880 by James Tasker of nearby Cornish, a well-known regional builder of covered bridges. It underwent rehabilitation several times in the 20th century, including a complete rebuilding in 1963, when concrete abutments were laid, and steel beams were added to carry the active load.

== See also ==
- List of New Hampshire covered bridges
- List of bridges on the National Register of Historic Places in New Hampshire
- National Register of Historic Places listings in Sullivan County, New Hampshire
