= Tilton Island Park Bridge =

- U.S. National Register of Historic Places
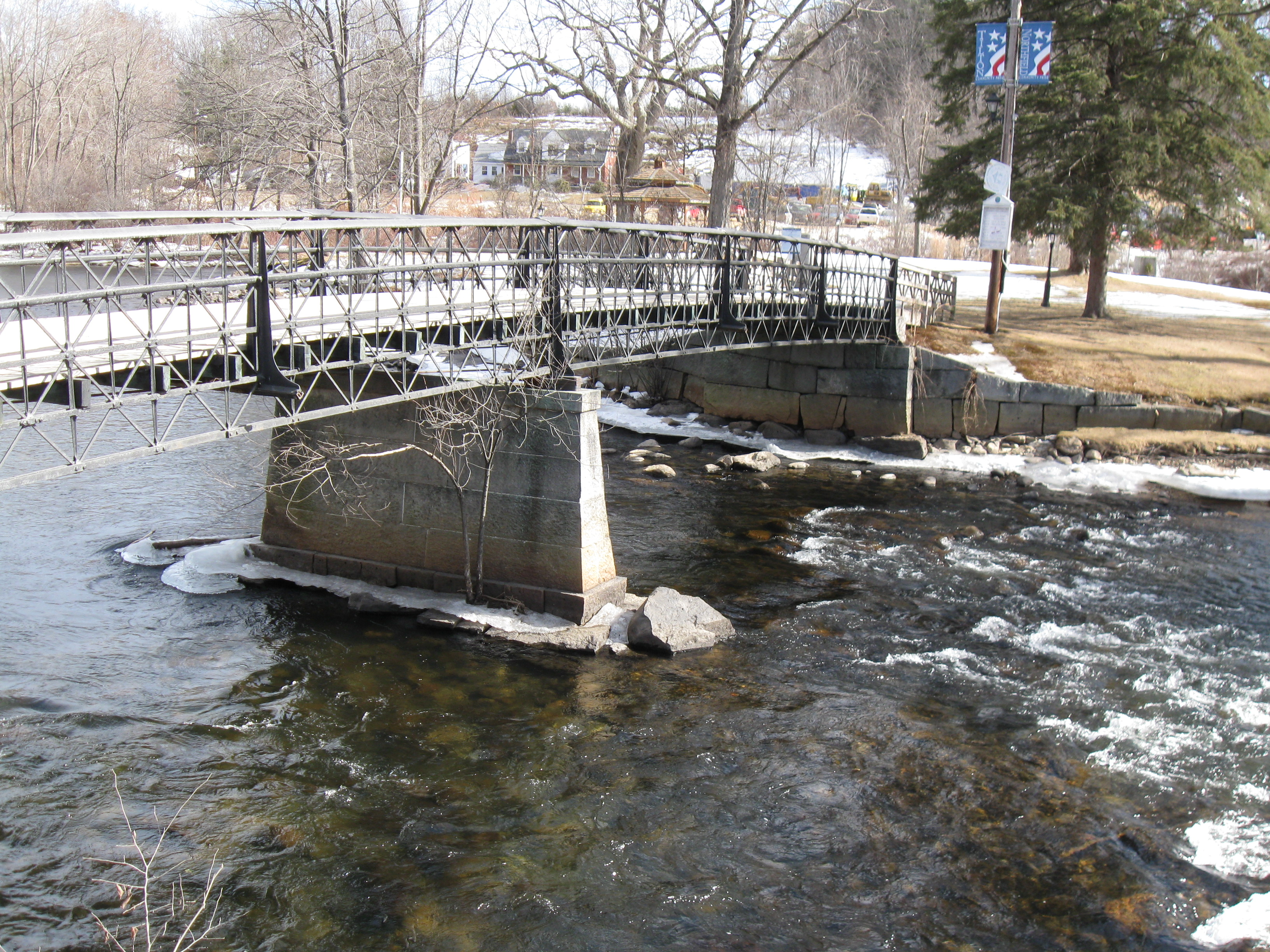

- Location within New Hampshire Location within the United States
- Location: Tilton Island Park, Tilton, New Hampshire
- Coordinates: 43°26′32″N 71°35′13″W
- Area: less than one acre
- Built: 1881
- Architect: Truesdell, Lucius E.; Briggs, Albert D.
- Architectural style: Truesdell Truss
- NRHP reference No.: 80000268
- Added to NRHP: March 21, 1980

The Tilton Island Park Bridge is a foot bridge in Tilton, New Hampshire. It spans a portion of the Winnipesaukee River just east of downtown Tilton, providing access to Tilton Island Park, located on an island in the river. Built in 1881, it is a rare surviving example of a bridge with cast iron components, designed by a distinctive patent issued in 1858 to Lucius Truesdell. The bridge was listed on the National Register of Historic Places in 1980.

== Description and history ==
The Tilton Island Park Bridge is located at the eastern end of downtown Tilton, extending from the northwest shore of the Winnipesaukee River to the wooded Tilton Island Park. It consists of two Truesdell truss spans, which rest on granite abutments and a central granite pier. The bridge is 85 feet (26 m) in length, and 10 feet (3.0 m) wide. Its trusses are made of cast iron, using a patented design similar to that of Ithiel Town for wooden lattice bridges. The principal innovation in Lucius Truesdell's 1858 patent was the clamps which fix the lattice members together where they cross, providing additional rigidity, and a series of horizontal and vertical members which are integrated into the diagonal lattice members. The decking of the bridge is wooden planking laid over crossbeams that rest directly on the lowest truss members. The decking is stabilized by diagonal bracing tie rods fastened beneath these elements.

The bridge was manufactured by A. D. Briggs & Company and installed in 1881 by J. R. Smith. It, along with the park, was a gift to the town by Charles Tilton. Albert Briggs, the builder, apparently specialized in the construction of Truesdell patent bridges; this is one of the few of the design known to survive. It is also rare for its survival despite the use of cast iron, which later gave way to more weather-safe wrought iron and steel.

The park was closed some time in late 2021 due to structural concerns about the bridge.

== See also ==
- National Register of Historic Places listings in Belknap County, New Hampshire
- List of bridges on the National Register of Historic Places in New Hampshire
