= Wright's Bridge =

- U.S. National Register of Historic Places
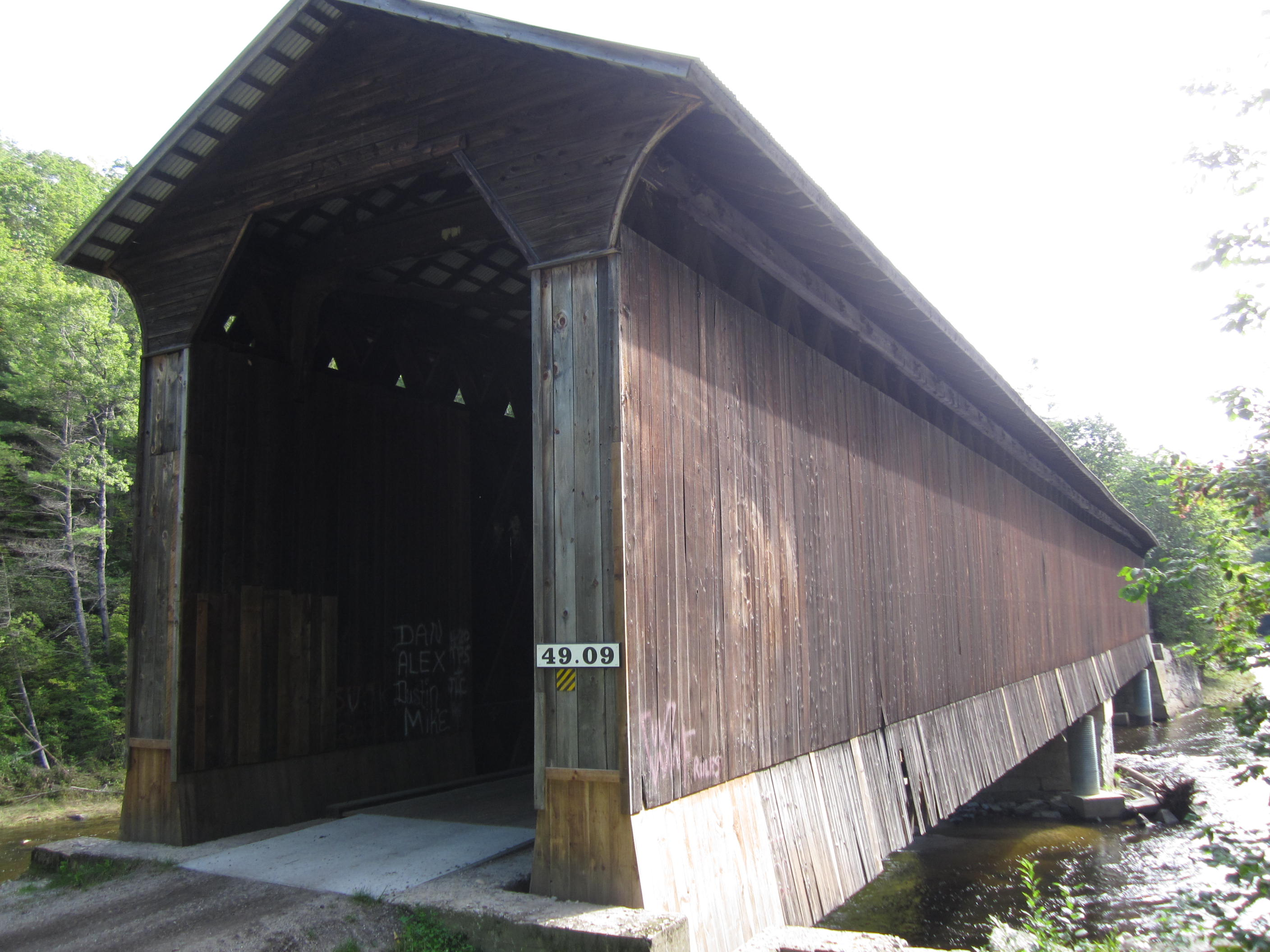

- Location within New Hampshire Location within the United States
- Location: Sugar River Trail over the Sugar River, Newport, New Hampshire
- Coordinates: 43°21′32″N 72°15′33″W
- Area: 1 acre (0.40 ha)
- Built: 1906
- Architect: Boston & Maine Railroad
- Architectural style: Town-Lattice Truss
- NRHP reference No.: 75000135
- Added to NRHP: June 10, 1975

Wright's Bridge is a historic covered bridge in Newport, New Hampshire. Originally built in 1906 to carry the Boston and Maine Railroad across the Sugar River, it now carries the multi-use Sugar River Trail. The bridge was listed on the National Register of Historic Places in 1975.

== Description and history ==
Wright's Bridge is located in a rural setting in western Newport, spanning the Sugar River about 1,200 feet (370 m) west of the trail's intersection with Chandler Mill Road. The bridge is a single-span Town double-lattice truss structure which has been reinforced by laminated arches. The bridge spans 122 feet (37 m), with 6 feet (1.8 m) of overhang at each end, and rests on granite abutments. Its exterior is finished with vertical board siding extending to about 2 feet (0.61 m) below the eaves. The portals have vertical boards along the sides, and horizontal boards above the opening. Elements of the trusses and arches are joined by a combination of wooden pegging, iron reinforcing rods, and metal turnbuckles.

The bridge is named for S. K. Wright, who sold this portion of the railroad right-of-way in 1871. The first bridge on the site was built soon afterward, by the Sugar River Railroad which originally built this section of railroad. Its successor, the Boston & Maine, built this replacement structure in 1906. The line was operated by the B&M until 1954 when it was sold to the Claremont & Concord Railway. The C&C last ran to Newport in 1977 and the line was subsequently abandoned. The bridge is one of two surviving railroad bridges on the line; the other is Pier Bridge.

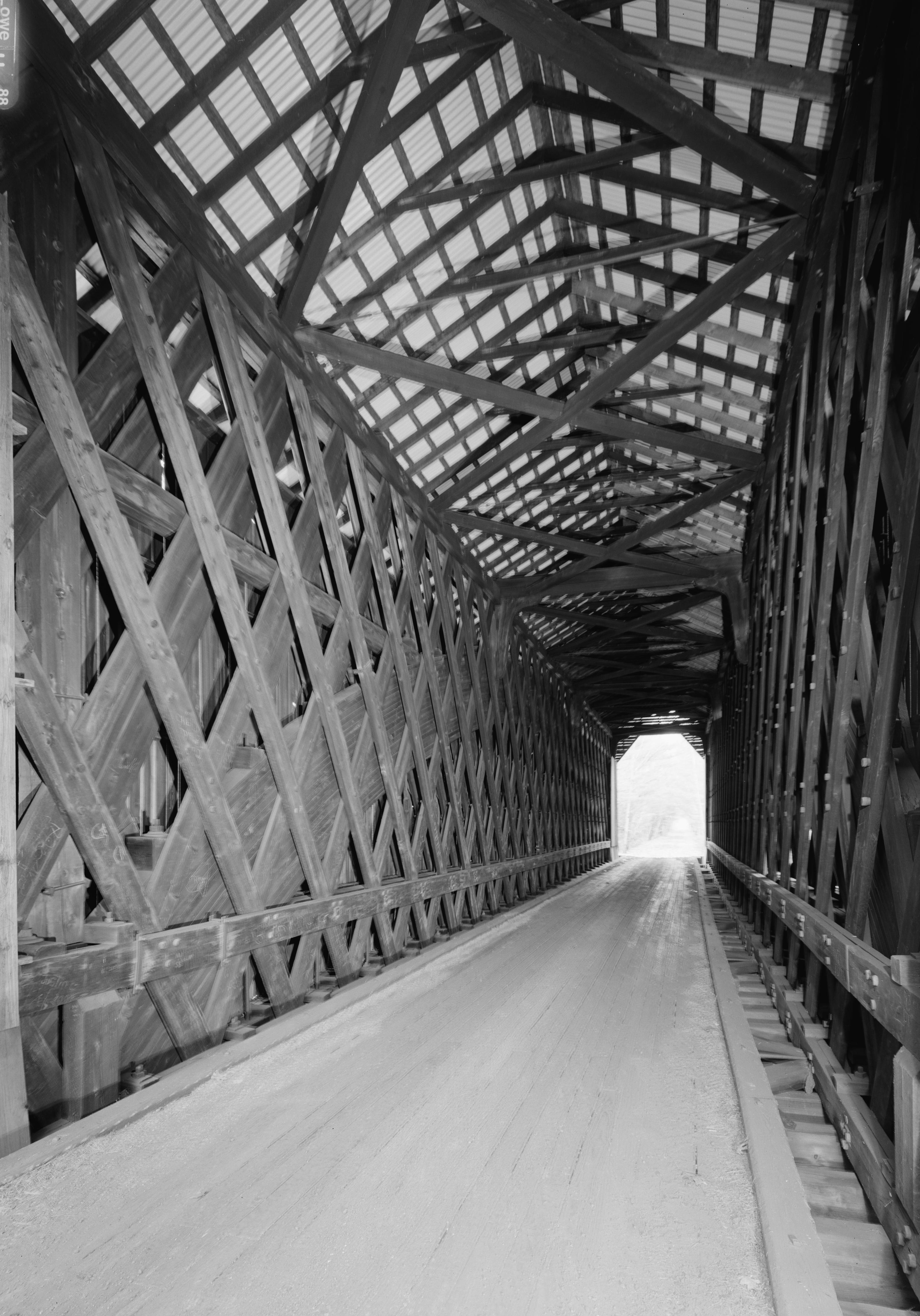

== See also ==
- List of bridges documented by the Historic American Engineering Record in New Hampshire
- List of bridges on the National Register of Historic Places in New Hampshire
- List of New Hampshire covered bridges
- National Register of Historic Places listings in Sullivan County, New Hampshire
