= Haverhill–Bath Covered Bridge =

- U.S. National Register of Historic Places
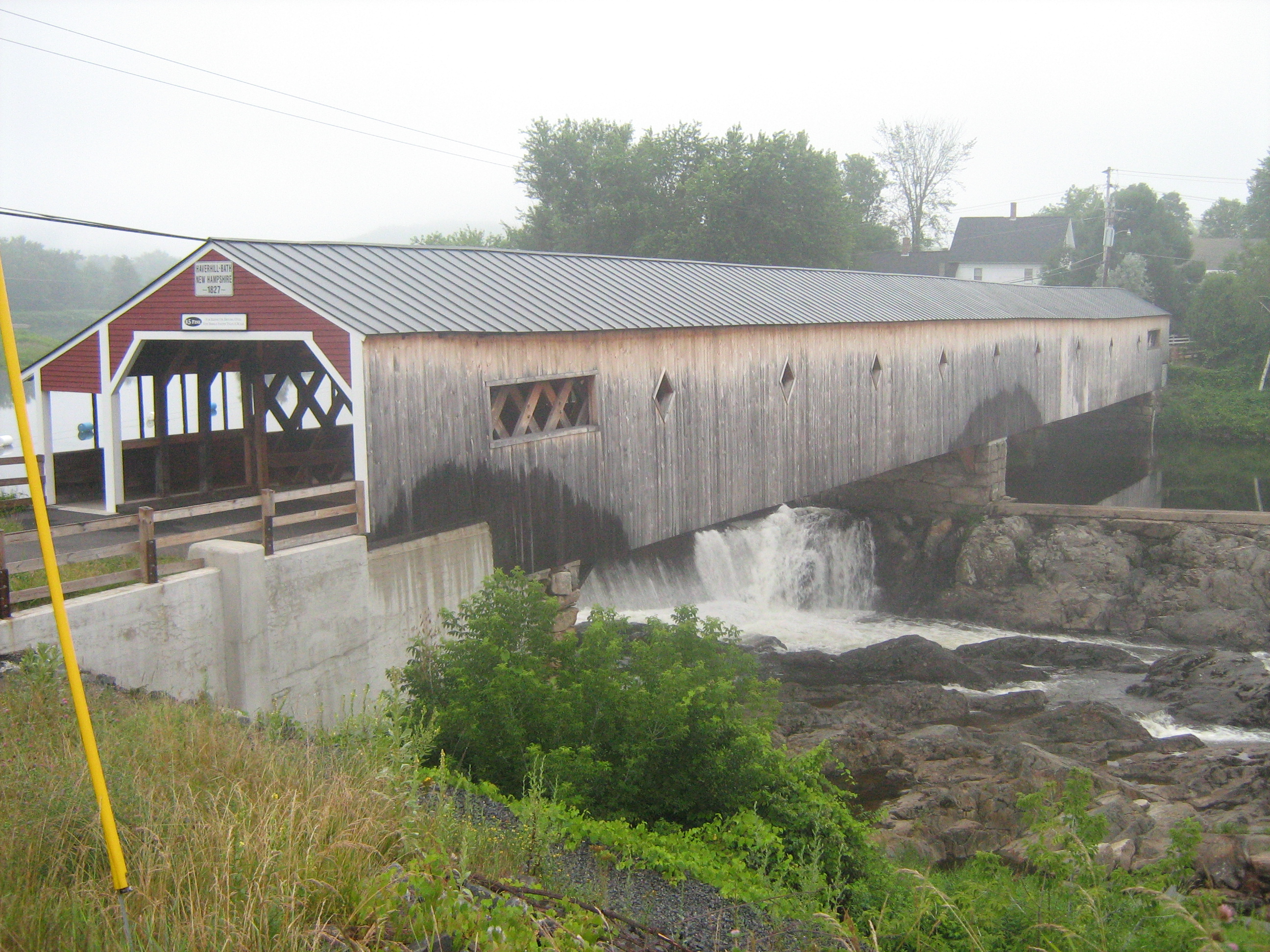
- The bridge following restoration in 2004

- Location within New Hampshire Location within the United States
- Location: Next to NH 135, Woodsville, New Hampshire
- Coordinates: 44°9′17″N 72°2′11″W
- Area: 0.1 acres (0.040 ha)
- Built: 1829
- Architectural style: Town lattice truss
- NRHP reference No.: 77000091
- Added to NRHP: April 18, 1977

The Haverhill–Bath Covered Bridge (Note: Haverhill–Bath per the NRHP nomination; listed as Bath–Haverhill on the state's website.) is a historic covered bridge over the Ammonoosuc River joining Bath and Woodsville, New Hampshire. Formerly used to carry New Hampshire Route 135, the bridge was idled in 1999. Restored in 2004, it is now open to foot traffic only. It is believed to be the oldest covered bridge in the state.

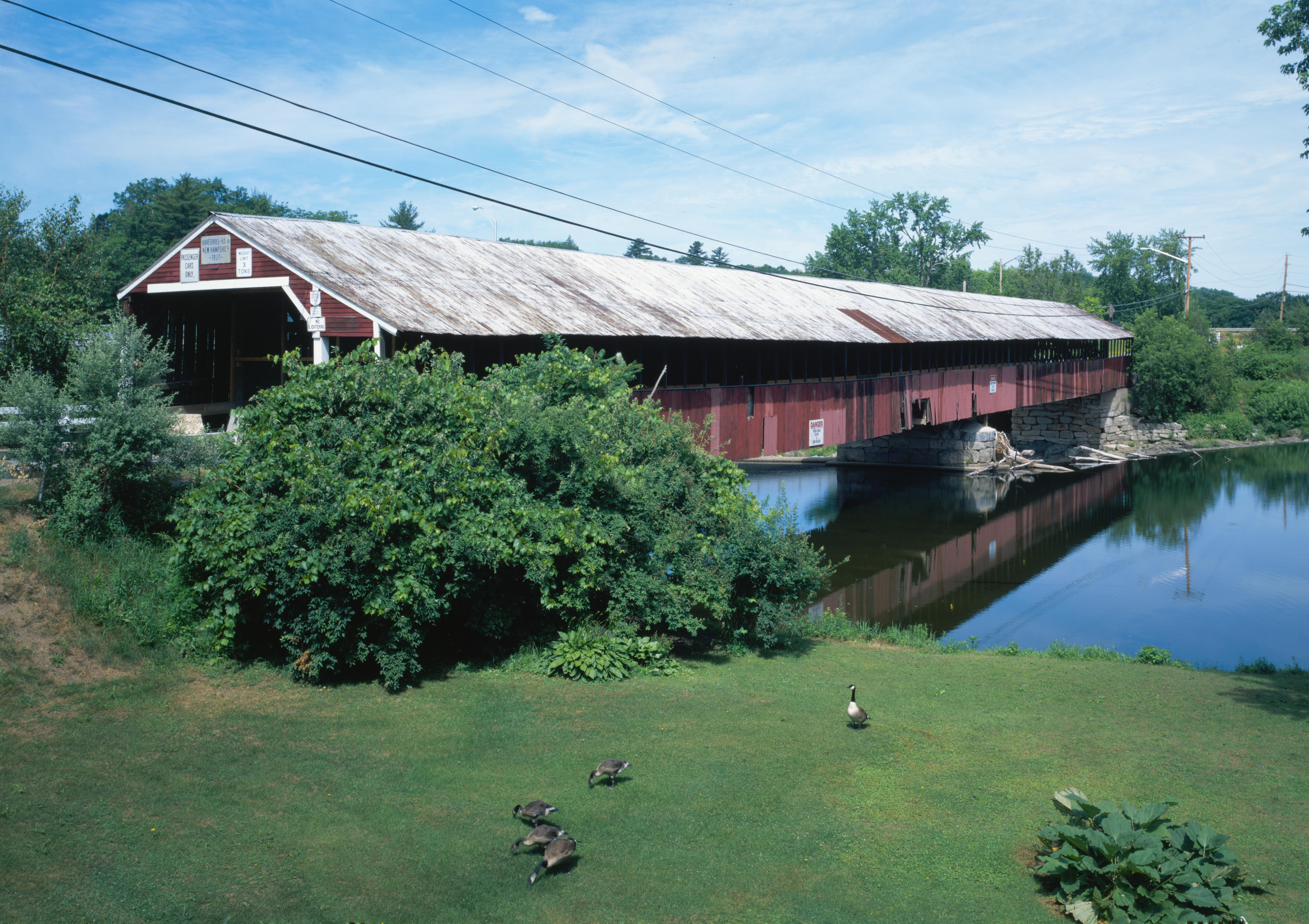
Haverhill–Bath Covered Bridge in 2003, before restoration

The Haverhill–Bath Bridge is located in the northwestern corner of the town of Haverhill, connecting the village of Woodsville to a rural area in the southwestern corner of Bath. The bridge was built in 1829 with funding provided by both towns. It was built by Moses Abbott and Leonard Walker after Airel Miner, the first choice to supervise the construction, stepped down. The bridge is a Town lattice truss bridge with two spans, resting on stone and concrete abutments, and a stone pier. The road bed is 256 feet 8 inches (78.23 m) long and 14 ft 4 in (4.37 m) wide, and the roof is 277 ft 8 in (84.63 m) long, covering not just the bridge but also framed entrances on both sides. There is a sidewalk (not part of the original construction) on the east (upstream) side of the bridge that is 6 ft 1 in (1.85 m) wide. The roof on that side is extended over the sidewalk, giving the roof profile that of a saltbox house. The downstream side is finished in vertical board siding, with diamond openings spaced along its length and two larger rectangular openings near the ends.

The bridge has survived a number of floods, most notably in 1927, when the lattice work was pierced by a tree trunk, and a barn was carried into the structure. It has been renovated multiple times, most recently in 2004. The bridge was listed on the National Register of Historic Places in 1977. It is commemorated by New Hampshire Historical Marker No. 190.

== See also ==
- List of bridges documented by the Historic American Engineering Record in New Hampshire
- List of bridges on the National Register of Historic Places in New Hampshire
- List of New Hampshire covered bridges
- National Register of Historic Places listings in Grafton County, New Hampshire
