= Whittier Bridge =

- U.S. National Register of Historic Places
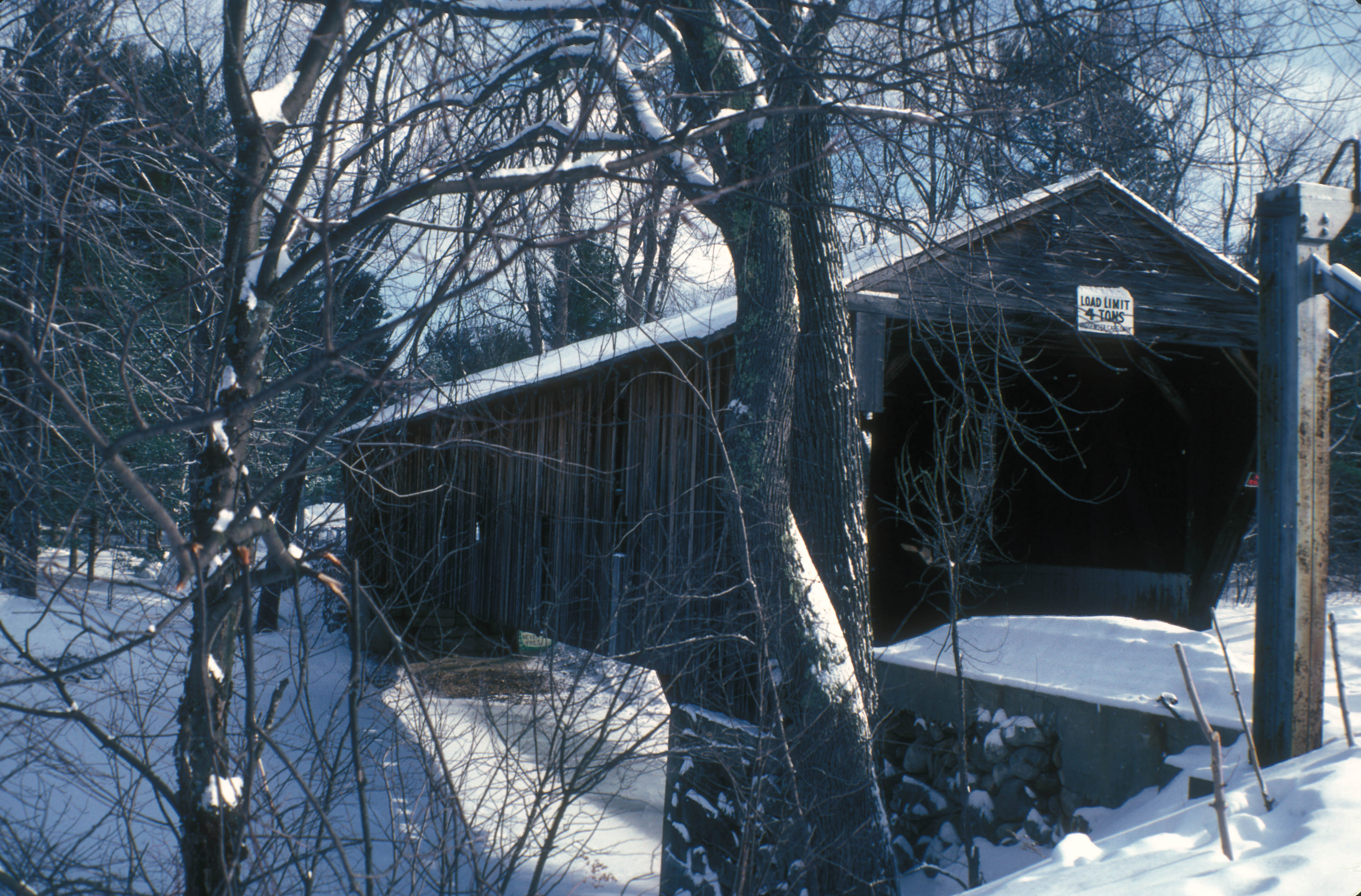
- The bridge in 1970

- Location within New Hampshire Location within the United States
- Location: Old NH 25 (Nudd St. and Covered Bridge Rd.), Ossipee, New Hampshire
- Coordinates: 43°49′20″N 71°12′43″W
- Area: 0.1 acres (0.040 ha)
- Built: 1870
- Architectural style: Paddleford Truss
- NRHP reference No.: 84002558
- Added to NRHP: March 15, 1984

The Whittier Bridge is a historic wooden covered bridge in Ossipee, New Hampshire. The bridge carried an old alignment of New Hampshire Route 25 (now Nudd Road and Old Covered Bridge Road) over the Bearcamp River. Built in 1870, it is one of New Hampshire's few surviving 19th-century covered bridges, and a rare example of a Paddleford truss. The bridge was listed on the National Register of Historic Places in 1984. It was closed to vehicular traffic in 1989, and was removed from its footings for restoration in 2008. As of September 2019, the bridge is resting on Nudd Road adjacent to the crossing point. It was placed back on its abutments in the late fall of 2022.

== Description and history ==
The Whittier Bridge site is located southwest of the village of West Ossipee, at a long-used crossing point of the Bearcamp River, which flows roughly southeast toward Ossipee Lake from the White Mountains to the northwest. The bridge is a single-span Paddleford truss, with a total length of 137 feet 7 inches (41.94 m) and a clear span of 114 feet (35 m). Its exterior is clad in vertical board siding, which after its most recent renovation only extended part way up the sides. The portal ends project at an angle to a gable. The abutments are dry-laid large granite blocks reinforced by concrete.

Bridges have been documented at this location as early as 1792. The roadway was cut in the 1770s by Captain John Dudley on behalf of Ossipee's proprietors, predating the town's incorporation. Known locally as the Great Bridge, it served as part of the major east–west route (now NH 25) in the region, later joined by an important north–south (now NH 16), with the two meeting in West Ossipee. Bridges standing here were documented by the town as undergoing either major repairs or reconstructions in the 19th century. The bridge preceding this one was washed off the abutments by flooding in 1869, and was rebuilt on commission from Henry Banks, proprietor of the West Ossipee Hotel. It is named for poet John Greenleaf Whittier, who summered at the hotel for several years in the 1870s. Like its predecessors, it has undergone a number of renovations and alterations. Laminated arches were added to strengthen it in the late 19th century, and steel supporting elements were added in the 1940s. It was again given a major restoration in 1983, at which time those elements were removed, and the full-height siding was replaced with the present shorter siding.

The bridge was closed again to traffic in 1989, and in 2008 it was removed from the abutments. Having been placed on the Nudd Road approach, a timeline for the bridge to be restored has been established. A project to move the bridge back into place is moving forward with CPM Constructors out of Freeport, Maine and will likely start spring of 2022. As of December 2022, the bridge was moved to its abutments. It is now open for pedestrian traffic only.

== See also ==
- List of bridges documented by the Historic American Engineering Record in New Hampshire
- List of bridges on the National Register of Historic Places in New Hampshire
- List of covered bridges in New Hampshire
- National Register of Historic Places listings in Carroll County, New Hampshire
