= Keniston Bridge =

- U.S. National Register of Historic Places
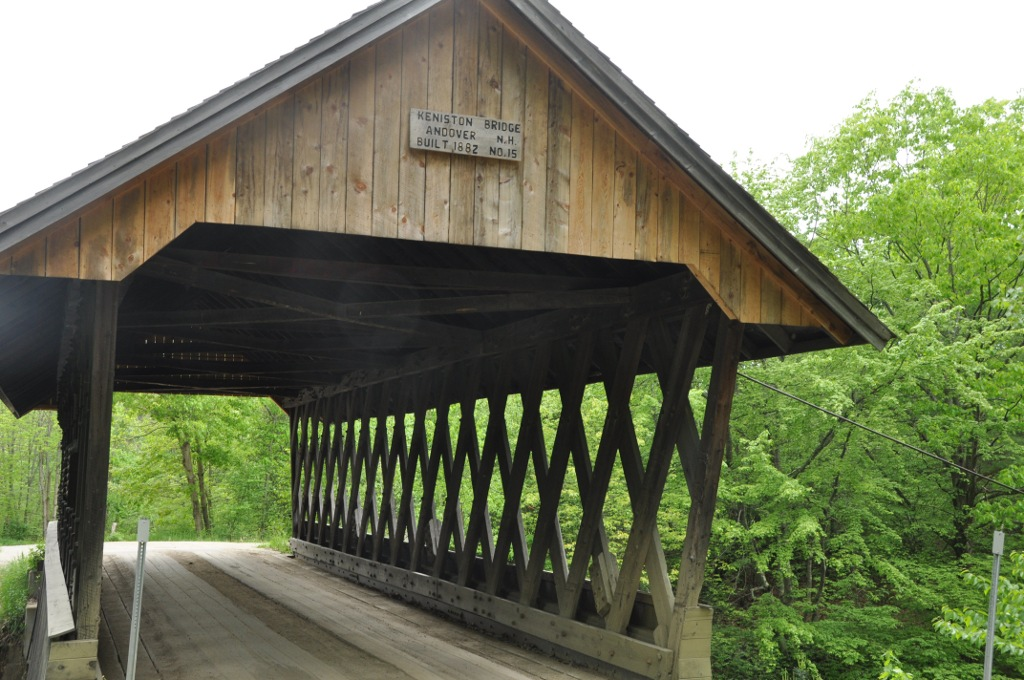

- Location within New Hampshire Location within the United States
- Location: Bridge Rd. over Blackwater River, Andover, New Hampshire
- Coordinates: 43°26′6″N 71°50′12″W
- Area: 0.1 acres (0.040 ha)
- Built: 1882
- Built by: Hamilton, Albert R.
- Architectural style: Ithiel Town through truss
- NRHP reference No.: 89000190
- Added to NRHP: March 16, 1989

The Keniston Bridge is a historic covered bridge in Andover, New Hampshire, carrying Bridge Street over the Blackwater River. Built in 1882, it is of Town through truss construction, and is one of the few surviving 19th-century covered bridges in the state. It is also one of the only ones whose sides are not fully sheathed, exposing the trusses. The bridge was listed on the National Register of Historic Places in 1989.

== Description and history ==
The Keniston Bridge is located in a rural setting west of Andover's main village, carrying Bridge Street over the Blackwater River a short way south of U.S. Route 4. It is a single-span Town truss, mounted on granite bridge abutments that have been partially rebuilt in concrete. Much of the fabric of the bridge is original, although strengthening elements (wooden chords and steel beams) have been added to the trusses and the road bed, and portions of the downstream truss have been replaced. The bridge is topped by a wooden shingle roof, and measures 73 feet (22 m) in length and 19 feet (5.8 m) in width. The distance between the abutments on which it rests is 51 feet (16 m).

The bridge was built by a local builder, Albert Hamilton, and underwent repairs and renovations in 1949 and 1981. Most of the strengthening elements enabling it to carry heavier loads have been effectively hidden behind its sheathing or beneath its main structure. Unlike many of the state's surviving covered bridges, its sides are not completely sheathed, with vertical siding only rising about 5 feet (1.5 m). The bridge has survived in part because it is on a minor road that sees very little traffic.

== See also ==
- National Register of Historic Places listings in Merrimack County, New Hampshire
- List of bridges on the National Register of Historic Places in New Hampshire
