= Contoocook =

Contoocook may refer to a place name in New Hampshire, the United States:

- The Contoocook River, a tributary of the Merrimack River
- Contoocook, New Hampshire, a village in the town of Hopkinton, named for the river
  - Contoocook Railroad Bridge, oldest surviving covered railroad bridge
  - Contoocook Railroad Depot, restored railroad depot in Contoocook, New Hampshire
- Contoocook Lake in Jaffrey and Rindge, New Hampshire, the source of the river
- USS Contoocook (1864), a U.S. Navy vessel during the American Civil War
