= Hopkinton High School =

Hopkinton High School may refer to:

- Hopkinton High School (New Hampshire) located in Hopkinton, New Hampshire
- Hopkinton High School (Massachusetts) located in Hopkinton, Massachusetts
