= Hopkinton School District (New Hampshire) =

Public school district in Hopkinton, New Hampshire, United States

Address
- 204 Maple Street Hopkinton, New Hampshire, 03229; United States

District information
- Type: Public school district
- Grades: PK–12
- Superintendent: Michael Flynn
- NCES District ID: 3303900

Students and staff
- Enrollment: 939 (2020-2021)
- Faculty: 79.80 (on FTE basis)
- Student–teacher ratio: 11.77

Other information
- Website: www.hopkintonschools.org

Hopkinton School District is a public school district located in Hopkinton, New Hampshire, U.S. The district serves about 900 students in four schools.

== Schools ==
=== High schools ===
- Hopkinton High School

=== Middle schools ===
- Hopkinton Middle School (combined in same building as high school)

=== Elementary schools ===
- Maple Street School 4-6
- Harold Martin School PK-3

== School Board ==
Name		Term
Andrea Folsom	Chair	Term expires 2023
Rob Nadeau	Vice Chair	Term expires 2023
Norman Goupil		Term expires 2025
Jim O'Brien		Term expires 2024
Dulcie Madden Lipoma		Term expires 2024
Rob Nadeau		Term expires 2023
Noah Aframe, Class of 2025	HHS Student Representative	2022-23
Florence Dapice	HHS Student Representative	2022-23
