= Howe-Quimby House =

Historic house in New Hampshire, United States

- U.S. National Register of Historic Places
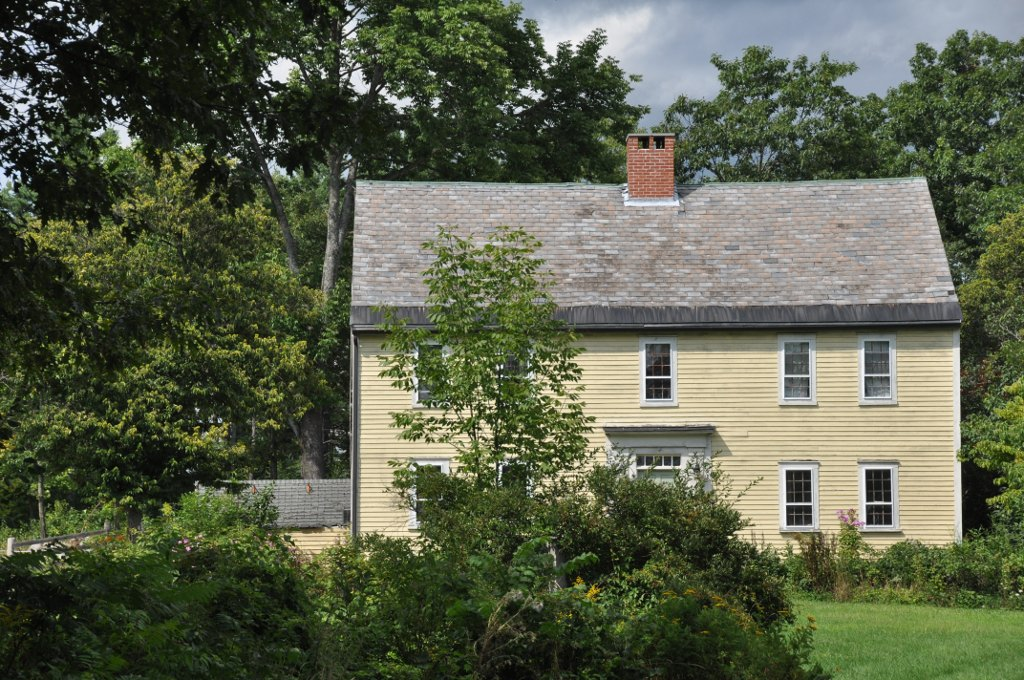

- Location within New Hampshire Location within the United States
- Location: 862 Sugar Hill Rd., Hopkinton, New Hampshire
- Coordinates: 43°9′29″N 71°42′3″W
- Area: 17 acres (6.9 ha)
- Built: 1780
- Built by: Howe, David B.
- Architectural style: Greek Revival, Georgian
- NRHP reference No.: 80000295
- Added to NRHP: June 27, 1980

The Howe-Quimby House is a historic house on Sugar Hill Road in Hopkinton, New Hampshire. Built about 1780, it is a well-preserved example of a rural 18th-century farmhouse with later stylistic modifications. The house was listed on the National Register of Historic Places in 1980.

== Description and history ==
The Howe-Quimby House is located in a rural setting in southwestern Hopkinton, on the west side of Sugar Hill Road, north of its junction with Holmes Road. It is a 2 1/2-story wood-frame structure, with a gabled roof, central chimney, and clapboarded exterior. Its main facade is oriented facing south and is five bays wide. The main entrance, set at its center, is flanked by sidelight windows and pilasters, and is topped by a transom window and corniced entablature. The interior follows a center chimney plan, with a narrow entrance vestibule, chambers to either side of the chimney, and a large rear kitchen with smaller chambers at the corners. Many of the rooms have woodwork that is either original to the construction, or were the result of an early 19th century Greek Revival update. A 1 1/2-story frame ell extends to one side.

The main block of the house was built between 1766 and 1784 by David Howe, and sold to Jonathan Quimby in 1784. The basic styling of the exterior is Georgian, although the main and side entries received Greek Revival treatment, with door hoods and sidelight windows. The interior of the house is divided in its styling: after Jonathan Quimby's death, the inside was divided between his wife and eldest son. The wife maintained her side of the house with Georgian/Federal styling, while his son updated his side with Greek Revival features.

== See also ==
- National Register of Historic Places listings in Merrimack County, New Hampshire
