= Irene Shepard =

American politician (1922–2014)

Irene James Shepard (May 14, 1922 – April 13, 2014) was an American educator and politician.

Born in Calais, Maine, Shepard received her bachelor's degree from University of Maine. She then taught French and lived in Hopkinton, New Hampshire where she was, after 50 years, the longest term living parishioner of St. Andrew's Episcopal Church of Hopkinton. Shepard served in the New Hampshire House of Representatives, in 1975, 1977, 1979, 1983, and 1985, as a Republican. In 1985, Shepard moved to Weare, New Hampshire. Shepard died in Concord, New Hampshire at the age of 91.
