= Otto and Vivika Heino =

American artists, Vivika (1910–1995) Otto (1915–2009)

Vivika and Otto Heino
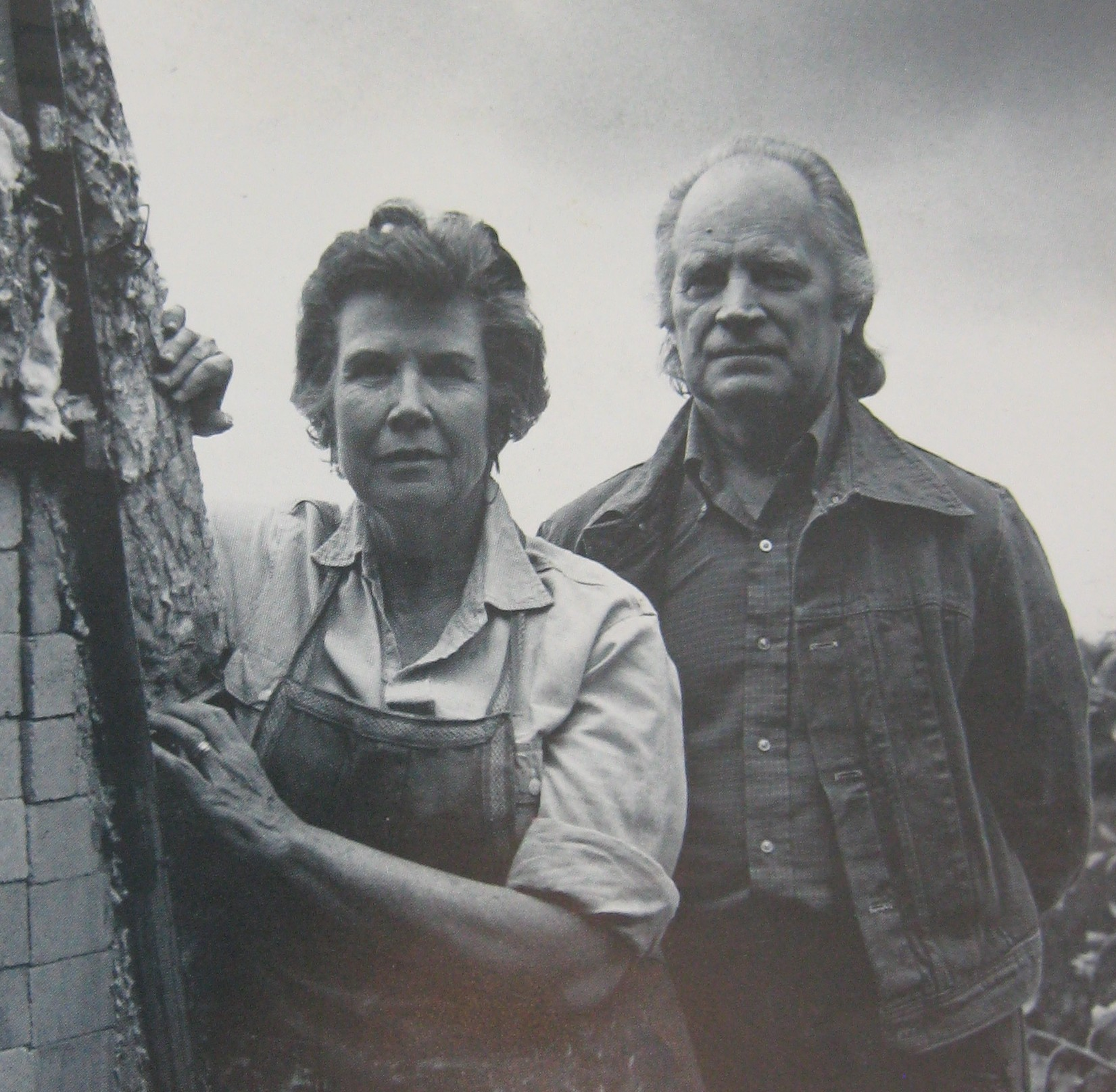
- Vivika and Otto at The Pottery, Ojai
- Born: Vivien Place; Aho Heino: Vivika June 27, 1910; Caledonia, New York; Otto April 20, 1915; East Hampton, Connecticut
- Died: Vivika September 1, 1995; Otto July 16, 2009; Ojai, California
- Known for: Ceramics
- Movement: Arts and Crafts

Otto Heino (April 20, 1915 – July 16, 2009) and Vivika Heino (June 27, 1910 – September 1, 1995) were artists working in ceramics. They collaborated as a husband-and-wife team for thirty-five years, signing their pots Vivika + Otto, regardless of who actually made them.

== Otto Heino ==
One of twelve children born of Finnish immigrants, Lena and August Heino, in East Hampton, Connecticut, United States. His family ran a dairy farm in quiet farm country. Otto Heino's involvement with ceramics began while serving in the U.S. Air Force in England; during a military leave, he spent several days watching Bernard Leach throw pots. Following his return to the US, he used his GI Bill funding in 1949 to study ceramics at the League of New Hampshire Arts and Crafts, in Concord, New Hampshire. There he met Vivika, his teacher, whom he was married to in 1950.

=== Military service ===
During World War II, Otto Heino served five years of active duty in the USAAF where he briefly worked on engines at a Rolls-Royce factory in England. He was assigned to the 357th Fighter Group, the "Yoxford Boys", based in Leiston, Suffolk. Due to his knowledge of Rolls-Royce engines, T/Sgt Otto Heino served as a crew chief, maintaining the group's P-51 Mustang fighters. Although he worked on several Mustangs, Otto is best known for being the personal crew chief of Bud Anderson's P-51 Mustangs, all of which were named "Old Crow". Never once in 116 combat missions did Anderson abort or return early due to mechanical problems, something Anderson attributes greatly to the dedicated and tireless work ethic of Otto and the rest of his ground crew. Aside from being a crew chief, Otto Heino, at one point, served as a waist gunner in a B-17 Flying Fortress. He was shot down twice over Germany, escaping certain death largely due in part to his Teutonic name and appearance.

=== Death ===
Otto Heino died of acute renal failure at Community Memorial Hospital in Ventura, California on July 16, 2009.

== Vivika Heino ==
Vivika was born Vivien Place in Caledonia, New York. In the mid-1930s, after earning a teaching degree at the Rochester Normal School, she spent two years with the Works Progress Administration theatre project, and headed the National Youth Administration in San Francisco. Discovering clay at this time, she studied at the California School of Fine Arts (now the San Francisco Art Institute), and with Glen Lukens at the University of Southern California. Lukens, a highly respected ceramist renowned for his glazes, gave her the opportunity to explore colored clays, develop new glazes, and experiment with raw materials. (In later years, she and Otto were to devote a day a week to measuring, mixing, and testing new glazes.) Her pots were exhibited at the 1939 Golden Gate International Exposition, in San Francisco.

Vivien Place started using the name Vivika while studying at the Swedish Applied Arts, in San Francisco, where teacher Margaret Gravandar thought everyone should have a Swedish name. (Even her mother started calling her that.)

In 1941, Vivika received an M.F.A. from New York State College of Ceramics at Alfred University, Alfred, New York. She was the second M.F.A. graduate from the ceramics program there (following Daniel Rhodes in 1940).

== Otto + Vivika ==
Otto and Vivika moved to California in 1952, where Vivika replaced Glen Lukens, head of ceramics department of the University of Southern California, during his sabbatical; she remained there for three years. Otto also taught at the university during this time. Also in 1952, she became a technical advisor for Twentieth Century Fox Studios, and she and Otto made 751 pots for the movie The Egyptian in 1953.

In 1955, as they prepared to return home to Hopkinton, New Hampshire, she was invited to reorganize the ceramics department at the Chouinard Art Institute in Los Angeles, and remained there for eight years. During that time, they remodelled a store on Hoover Street into a studio and began selling their work directly to the public, with success. Otto worked full-time as a potter while Vivika taught; during the summer, they switched roles, Otto teaching and Vivika producing pottery.

Vivika helped organise and became a board member of the Southern California Designer Craftsmen, and later a trustee for the southwestern region of the American Craft Council. She travelled to nearby states to help organize craft groups, something she had experience with from her days at the League of New Hampshire Arts and Crafts.

After an eleven-year stay in California (originally expected to last two), Vivika accepted in 1963 an offer to teach at the Rhode Island School of Design, in Providence, Rhode Island. In 1965, the Heinos reopened their home and studio in Hopkinton, New Hampshire.

Teaching was a very important part of Vivika's life. Although he also enjoyed teaching, Otto preferred studio production. Over the years, Vivika accepted a number of short-term teaching assignments, punctuated by periods of studio work with Otto.

What you give away you have forever; what you keep to yourself, you lose." (Vivika Heino)

They later returned to California, crossing the country in three moving vans, carrying 29 tons of materials. They purchased a house in Ojai, a small community in the mountains northwest of Los Angeles, built by Beatrice Wood, a friend since 1952. Their pottery studio, The Pottery, produced functional and decorative vessels, as well as architectural commissions.

The Heinos supported themselves as potters throughout their career. Clean lines and distinctive glazes mark their work; avoiding ceramic trends, they focused on traditional and utilitarian pottery. Glazes, however, are Heino's greatest legacy. The yellow glaze being their most famous one. They were part of a generation that sought to redefine the relationship between ceramics and modern art.

== Awards ==
- Gold Medal from the Sixth Biennale internationale de céramique d'art, in Vallauris, France. (1978)
- Silver Medal from the International Ceramics Exhibitions in Ostend, Belgium (1959)

== Exhibitions ==
- American Craft Museum, New York City, New York
- County Art Museum and Craft Folk Art Museum, Los Angeles, California
- De Young Museum, San Francisco, California
- Museum of Fine Arts, Boston, Massachusetts
- Picasso Museum in Vallauris, France
- Smithsonian Institution, Washington, DC
- Craft & Folk Art Museum, Los Angeles
- Mingei Museum, San Diego, California
- Ventura County Museum
