= Clinton Warrington Stanley =

American judge (1830–1884)

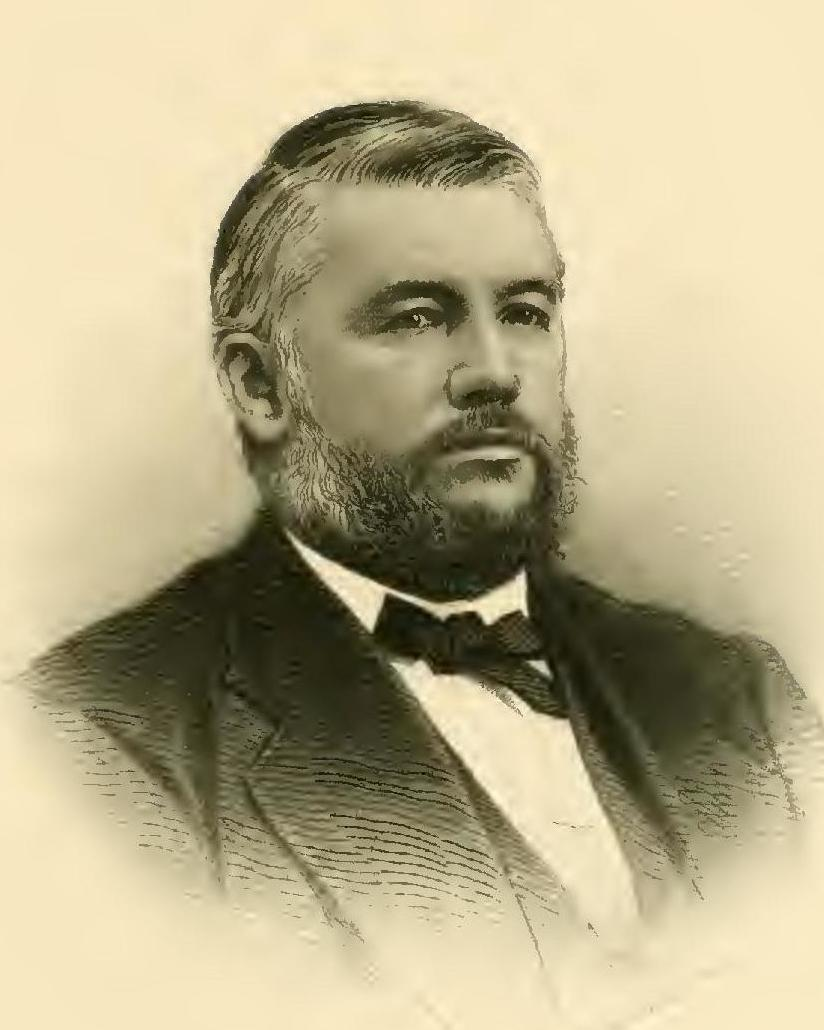
- Born: Clinton Warrington Stanley; December 5, 1830; Hopkinton, New Hampshire
- Died: December 1, 1884 (aged 53); Manchester, New Hampshire
- Citizenship: United States
- Education: Dartmouth College

Clinton Warrington Stanley (December 5, 1830 – December 1, 1884) was a New Hampshire lawyer and judge who served as a justice of the New Hampshire Supreme Court from 1876 to 1884.

== Early life, education, and career ==
Born in Hopkinton, New Hampshire, Stanley was educated in the common schools and the local academy of Hopkinton, and graduated from Dartmouth College in 1849. He read law in the office of Hon. Hamilton E. Perkins, of Concord, New Hampshire, and in the office of Hon. George W. Morris, of Manchester, New Hampshire, and was admitted to the bar in 1852, forming a partnership with Morris. The firm of Morris & Stanley had a large practice. In 1865, Stanley was chosen as president of the City National Bank and held that position for fourteen years. In 1881 he was elected a trustee of Dartmouth College, to succeed Judge Ira Allen Eastman.

== Judicial service ==
Alongside his private practice, Stanley was a United States commissioner for the District of New Hampshire for several years before his elevation to the state bench, continuing in that role until the mid-1870s.

In 1874 the New Hampshire legislature reorganized the state's judiciary, creating a Circuit Court to handle much of the trial work previously heard in the state's Supreme Judicial Court. Stanley was appointed one of the associate justices of the new Circuit Court, sitting in Manchester and other parts of the state. He served in that capacity from 1874 to 1876.

Two years later the political balance in New Hampshire shifted, and a change in party control led to abolition of the Circuit Court and restoration of a restructured Supreme Court as the state's principal law court. Stanley was well-enough respected to be retained as an associate justice of the Supreme Court.

Stanley served as an associate justice of the New Hampshire Supreme Court from 1876 until his death in 1884. Contemporary evaluations emphasized his careful attention to commercial law, banking disputes, and questions of procedure, subjects with which he was familiar from practice and his banking career.

He remained in that office until his death, in Manchester, New Hampshire.

== Personal life and death ==
On December 24, 1857, Stanley married Julia Ann Woodbury, daughter of William and Philinda H. (Blanchard) Woodbury, of Weare, New Hampshire.

Stanley's death came suddenly, after a brief illness, just four days before his 54th birthday.

Political offices
Preceded by Newly reorganized court	Justice of the New Hampshire Supreme Court; 1876–1884	Succeeded by George A. Bingham
