= William H. Long Memorial =

- U.S. National Register of Historic Places
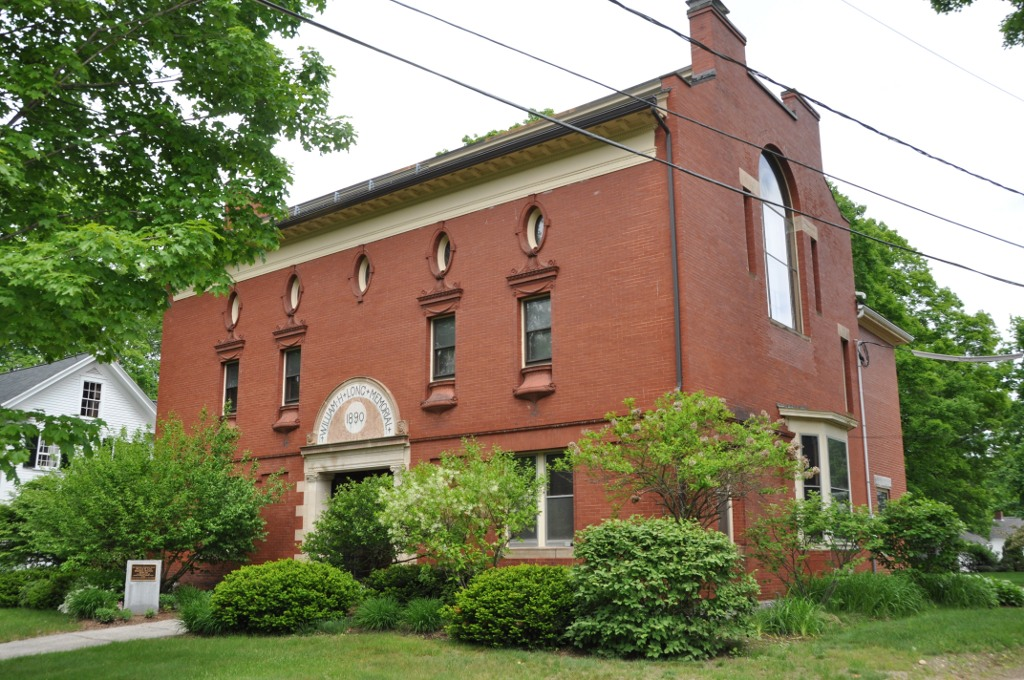

- Location within New Hampshire Location within the United States
- Location: Main St., Hopkinton, New Hampshire
- Coordinates: 43°11′27″N 71°40′19″W
- Area: 0.3 acres (0.12 ha)
- Built: 1890
- Architect: Means & Gilbert
- Architectural style: Federal Revival
- NRHP reference No.: 77000092
- Added to NRHP: July 15, 1977

The William H. Long Memorial is a historic memorial building on Main Street in Hopkinton, New Hampshire. The brick, granite, and sandstone three-story building was constructed in 1890 as a memorial to a member of a prominent local family. The bequest stipulated that the building be used as a home for the local historical society, a function it continues to perform. It was also used to house the local public library. The building was designed by the Boston firm of Means & Gilbert, and is predominantly made of brick. The main entry, centered on the long wall, is recessed under a pilastered entablature topped by a semicircular tablet inscribed with the memorial inscription. Windows on the second floor are framed in ornamented stonework and topped by small oval oculus-like windows.

The building was listed on the National Register of Historic Places in 1977.

== William H. Long ==
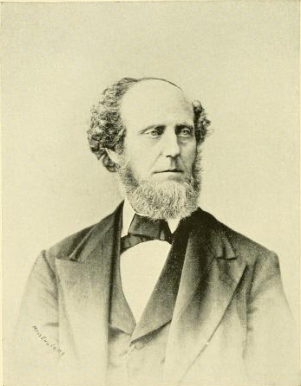
William H. Long

William Harrison Long was born in Hopkinton, New Hampshire on September 9, 1813. He was the son of Isaac Long and Susanna Kimball. Long graduated from Hopkinton academy and went on to graduate from Yale with his M.A. He began his career teaching in Utica and Boston. He accepted the position of headmaster at the Dearborn School to begin September 4, 1847 until his retirement on September 1, 1882. He married Lucia A.D. Rollins on December 25, 1845. Long died on November 5, 1886. Lucia erected the memorial building in memory of her husband.

== Hopkinton Historical Society ==
The Hopkinton Historical Society, formerly known as the New Hampshire Antiquarian Society, is housed in the William H. Long Memorial Building, which was a gift to the Society in 1890. The Society offers exhibits of local history, lectures and tours, and maintains a collection of music scores, journals, diaries, books, maps, and artifacts.

== See also ==
- National Register of Historic Places listings in Merrimack County, New Hampshire
