= Hopkinton State Fair =

Annual event in New Hampshire, United States

Coordinates: 43°13′55″N 71°43′20″W

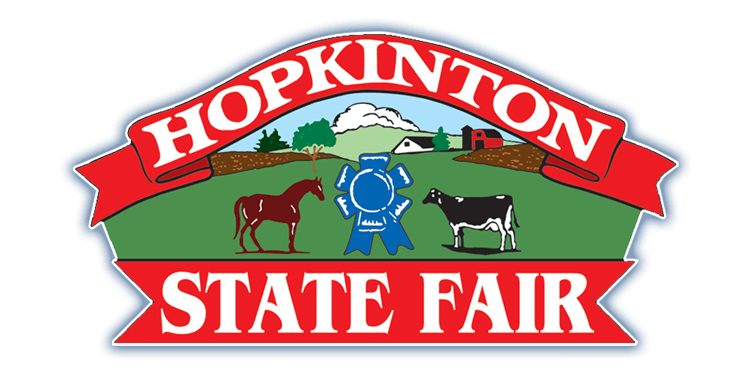
- Genre: State fair
- Date: September 3-7, 2026
- Begins: Thursday
- Ends: Labor Day
- Frequency: Annual
- Location: Hopkinton, New Hampshire
- Years active: 111
- Inaugurated: October 5, 1915
- Attendance: 70,000
- Website: www.hsfair.org

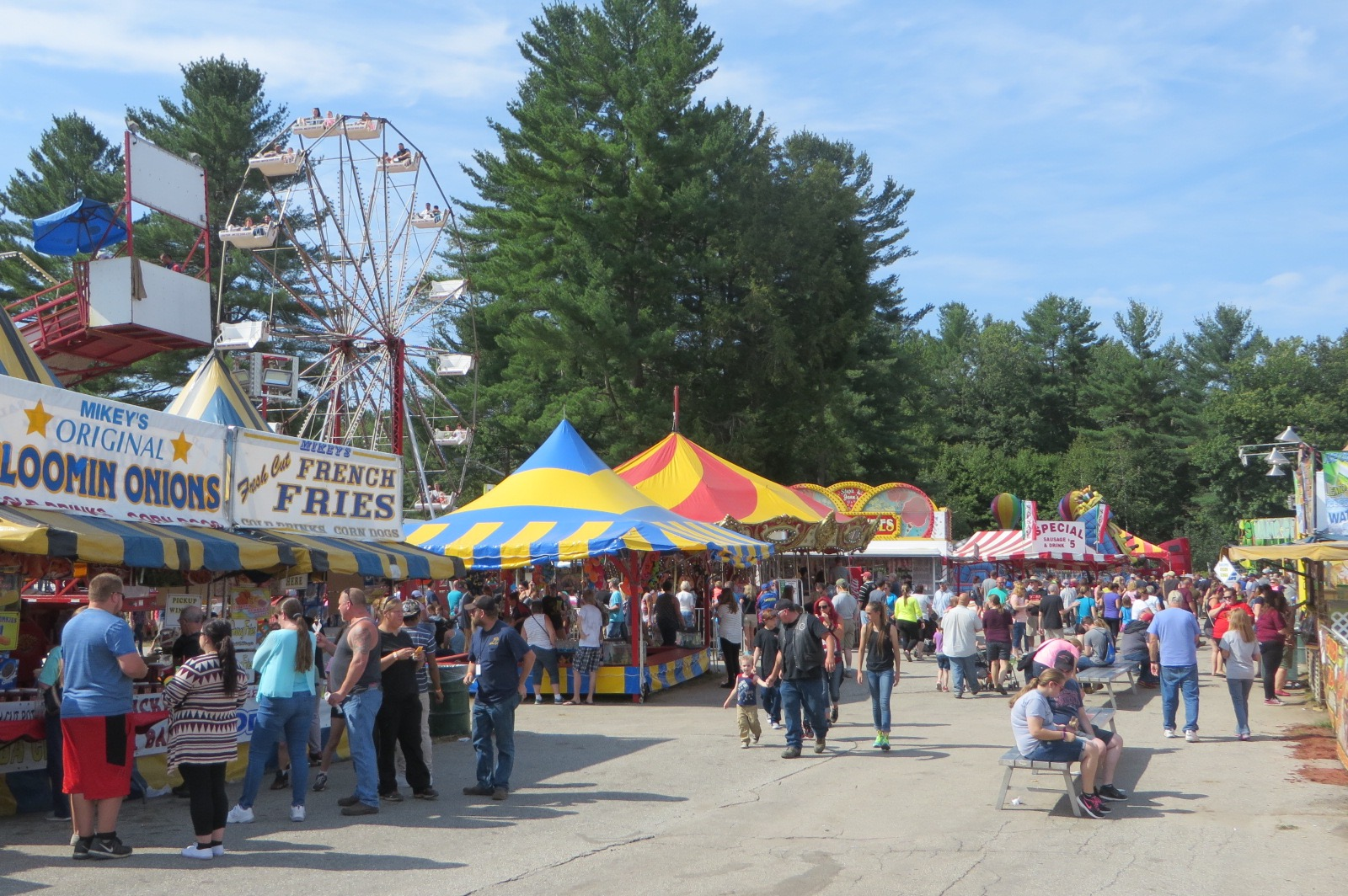
Hopkinton State Fair, 2016

The Hopkinton State Fair is an annual fair taking place in the village of Contoocook in Hopkinton, New Hampshire, United States. The fair began in 1915 and has continued to grow and become one of the most well known events in New England, and the largest fair in New Hampshire.

== History ==
The Hopkinton State Fair was originally started as a two-day agricultural event by the Contoocook Board of Trade, which held the first fair on October 5 and 6, 1915, at George's Park in Contoocook village. The event was named the "Hopkinton Fair" or the "Contoocook Valley Fair". The net profit for the first fair was just under $5. There was no fair in 1917 nor 1918. In 1921, the board expanded the fair to a three-day event from Tuesday through Thursday. World War II caused the fair to be cancelled between 1942 & 1945.

The fair consisted of agricultural exhibits, food vendors, baseball games, horse races, games, amusement rides and sideshow tents. Other entertainment such as the Hopkinton Town Band concerts became quite popular over the years. Ribbon and monetary prize competitions were popular exhibits for livestock and other farm animals.

After enduring tremendous growth, in 1947 the fair moved to its present location behind the Hopkinton High School, as it needed more land for its ever-expanding exhibits. In 1953, the Fair Association acquired more property for additional expansion.

In 1980, the fair became a five-day event opening on Thursday and operating through Labor Day.

In December 1985, the association directors voted to change the name of the fair to its current "Hopkinton State Fair".

In 1986, the fair held a logo design competition. The winner was Doug Price of Contoocook with the original design of the current fair logo.

In 2014, the association decided to shorten the fair back to a four-day event, running Friday through Labor Day.

This fair has operated annually as a five-day event since 2021 after the COVID-19 pandemic caused 2020's cancellation.
