= Hopkinton, New Hampshire =

- Town
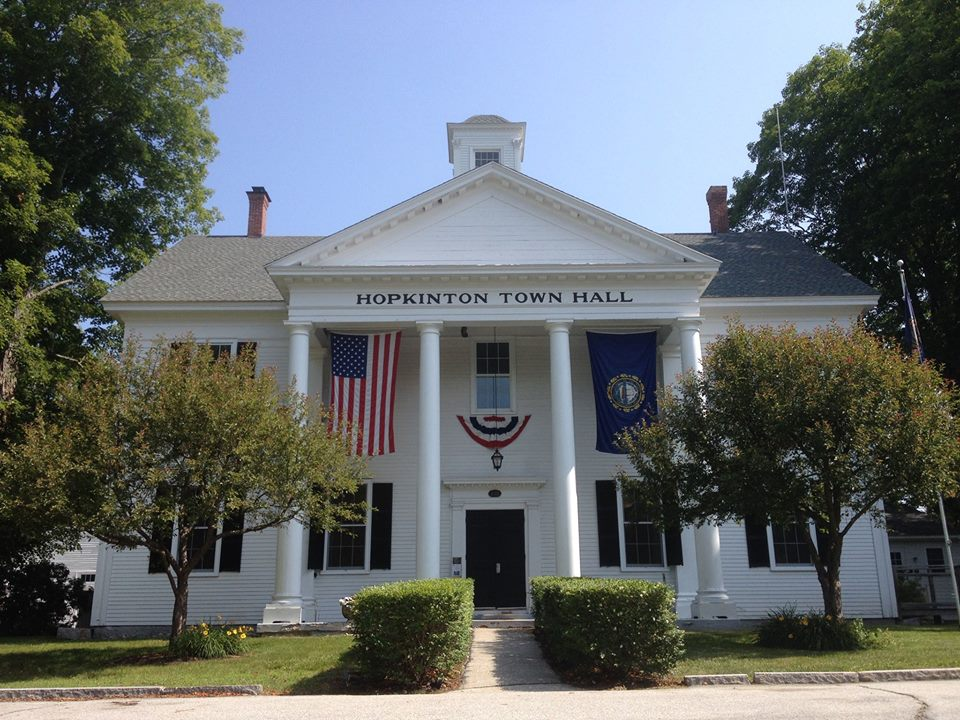
- Town hall

- Seal

- Location in Merrimack County and the state of New Hampshire.
- Coordinates: 43°11′52″N 71°41′48″W
- Country: United States
- State: New Hampshire
- County: Merrimack
- Granted: 1735
- Settled: 1736
- Incorporated: January 10, 1765
- Villages: Hopkinton; Contoocook; West Hopkinton

Area
  - Total: 45.09 sq mi (116.77 km^{2})
  - Land: 43.30 sq mi (112.14 km^{2})
  - Water: 1.79 sq mi (4.63 km^{2}) 3.97%
- Elevation: 515 ft (157 m)

Population (2020)
  - Total: 5,914
  - Density: 136/sq mi (52.7/km^{2})
- Time zone: UTC−5 (Eastern)
  - Summer (DST): UTC−4 (Eastern)
- ZIP code: 03229
- Area code: 603
- FIPS code: 33-37540
- GNIS feature ID: 873630
- Website: www.hopkinton-nh.gov

Hopkinton is a town in Merrimack County, New Hampshire, United States. The population was 5,914 at the 2020 census. The town has three distinct communities: Hopkinton village, mainly a residential area in the center of the town; Contoocook, the town's business hub, located in the north; and West Hopkinton, within the more agricultural portion of the town. The town is home to the Hopkinton State Fair, adjacent to Contoocook village, and to the historic Contoocook Railroad Depot and the Contoocook Railroad Bridge, the oldest covered railroad bridge in the United States.

== History ==
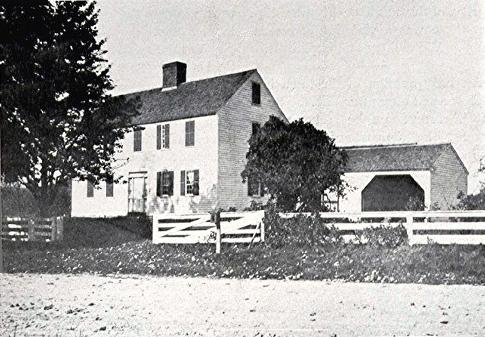
The town's first framed house built in 1745, as seen in 1901

The town was granted by colonial Governor Jonathan Belcher in 1735 as "Number 5" to settlers from Hopkinton, Massachusetts, who renamed it "New Hopkinton". First settled in 1736, colonists were required to build homes, fence in their land, plant it with English grass, and provide a home for a minister, all within seven years. The community was incorporated in 1765 by Governor Benning Wentworth, predating the establishment of counties in the colonial province. Built in 1789, the Congregational Church has a Revere bell. The state legislature met in Hopkinton occasionally between 1798 and 1807. In 1808, the town competed for the coveted position of state capital, but was defeated by neighboring Concord. Since 1823, the town has been within Merrimack County.

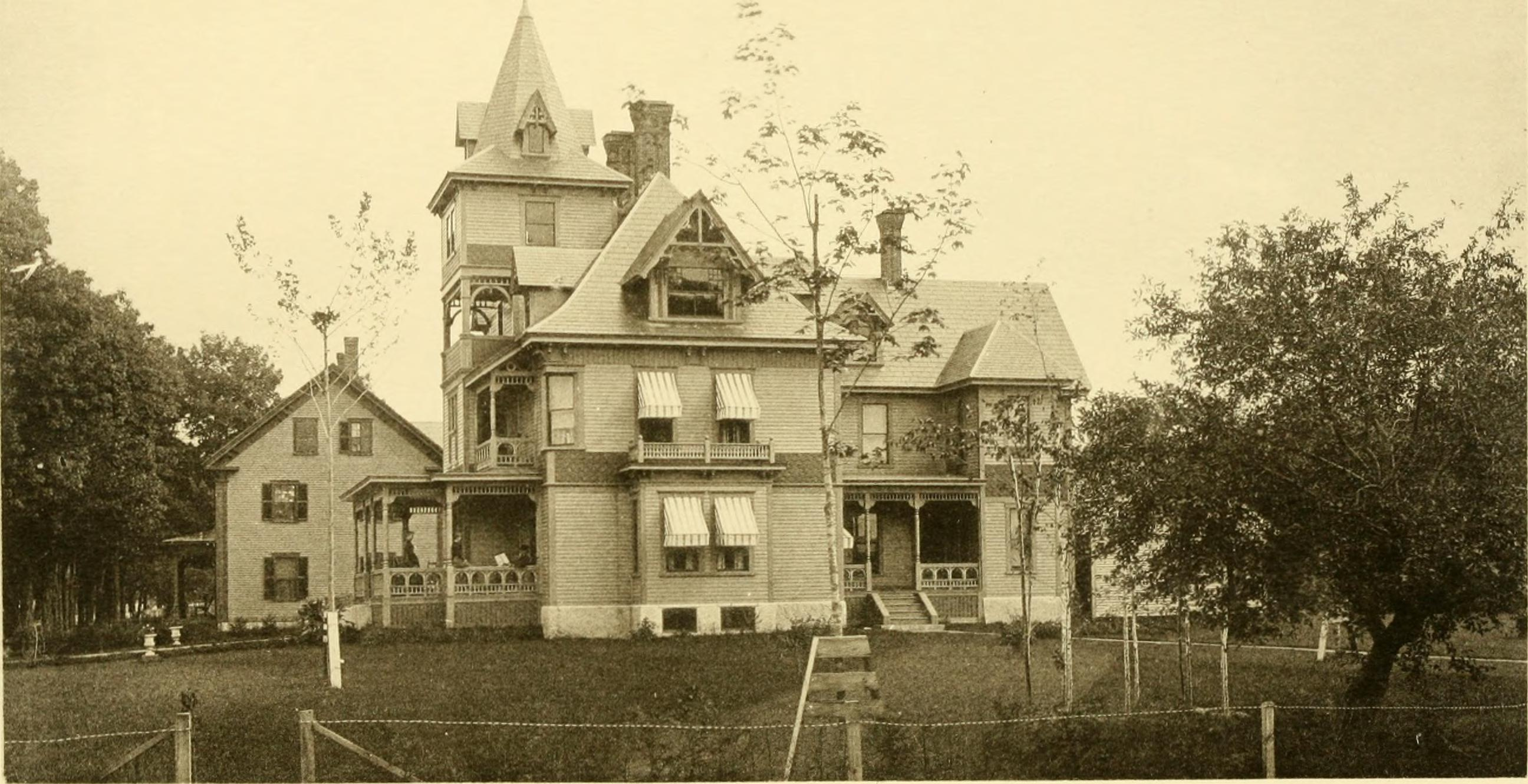
W. S. Davis Building 1889

A substantial portion of the town in the north was named "Contoocook Village", for a tribe of the Pennacook people who once lived there. Due to its position along the Contoocook River, it became a center for water-powered industry, particularly lumber and textiles. The Contoocook covered railroad bridge in the village is a remnant of the Boston & Maine Railroad and is the oldest covered bridge of its kind still standing in the United States. Next to the bridge is the Contoocook Railroad Depot, one of the original railroad depots for the Concord and Claremont Railroad.

Since 1915, Hopkinton has been home to the Hopkinton State Fair, an event which attracts thousands of visitors each year during the Labor Day weekend.

== Geography ==
According to the United States Census Bureau, the town has a total area of 45.1 square miles (116.8 km^{2}), of which 43.3 square miles (112.1 km^{2}) are land and 1.8 square miles (4.6 km^{2}) are water, comprising 3.97% of the town. Hopkinton is drained by the Contoocook River and its tributary, the Warner River, except for the southeast part of town, which drains to the Turkey River. The highest point in town is Shaker Hill, on the border with Henniker, with an elevation of 923 feet (281 m) above sea level. Hopkinton lies fully within the Merrimack River watershed.

=== Adjacent municipalities ===
- Webster (north)
- Concord (east)
- Bow (southeast)
- Dunbarton (southeast)
- Weare (south)
- Henniker (west)
- Warner (northwest)

== Demographics ==
Historical population
| Census | Pop. | Note | %± |
|---|---|---|---|
| 1790 | 1,715 | | — |
| 1800 | 2,015 | | 17.5% |
| 1810 | 2,216 | | 10.0% |
| 1820 | 2,437 | | 10.0% |
| 1830 | 2,474 | | 1.5% |
| 1840 | 2,454 | | −0.8% |
| 1850 | 2,169 | | −11.6% |
| 1860 | 2,178 | | 0.4% |
| 1870 | 1,814 | | −16.7% |
| 1880 | 1,836 | | 1.2% |
| 1890 | 1,817 | | −1.0% |
| 1900 | 1,652 | | −9.1% |
| 1910 | 1,578 | | −4.5% |
| 1920 | 1,438 | | −8.9% |
| 1930 | 1,485 | | 3.3% |
| 1940 | 1,587 | | 6.9% |
| 1950 | 1,831 | | 15.4% |
| 1960 | 2,225 | | 21.5% |
| 1970 | 3,007 | | 35.1% |
| 1980 | 3,861 | | 28.4% |
| 1990 | 4,806 | | 24.5% |
| 2000 | 5,399 | | 12.3% |
| 2010 | 5,589 | | 3.5% |
| 2020 | 5,914 | | 5.8% |
U.S. Decennial Census

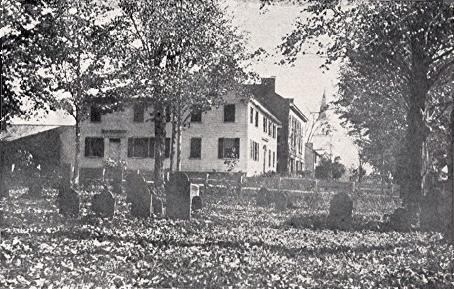
Oldest part of Hopkinton village cemetery, as seen in 1901

As of the census of 2010, there were 5,589 people, 2,204 households, and 1,631 families residing in the town. The population density was 124.7 inhabitants per square mile (48.1/km^{2}). The racial makeup of the town was 97.7% White, 0.3% African American, 0.1% Native American, 0.6% Asian, 0.07% Pacific Islander, 0.1% from other races, and 1.2% from two or more races. Hispanic or Latino of any race were 1% of the population.

There were 2,204 households, out of which 32.8% had children under the age of 18 living with them, 63.1% were married couples living together, 7% had a female householder with no husband present, and 26% were non-families. 19.6% of all households were made up of individuals living alone, and 6.3% had someone living alone who was 65 years of age or older. The average household size was 2.54 and the average family size was 2.92.

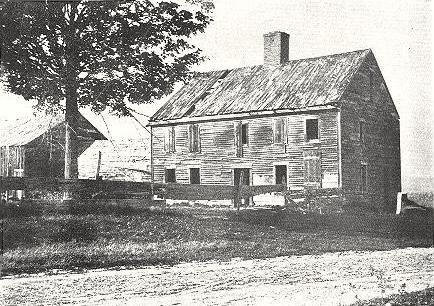
Old Parsonage in 1901

In the town, the population was spread out, with 25.3% under the age of 20, 3.3% from 20 to 24, 20.1% from 25 to 44, 35.2% from 45 to 64, and 16.2% who were 65 years of age or older. The median age was 45.8 years.

The median income for a household in the town was $84,911, and the median income for a family was $88,796. Males had a median income of $53,806 versus $45,656 for females. The per capita income for the town was $40,580. About 4.2% of the population was below the poverty line.

== Government ==
In the New Hampshire Senate, Hopkinton is in the 15th District, represented by Democrat Tara Reardon. On the New Hampshire Executive Council, Hopkinton is in the 2nd District, represented by Democrat Karen Liot Hill. In the United States House of Representatives, Hopkinton is in New Hampshire's 2nd congressional district, represented by Democrat Maggie Goodlander.

== Education ==
Public education is managed by the Hopkinton School District. Kindergarten through third-grade students attend Harold Martin School in Hopkinton village, and fourth through sixth graders attend Maple Street School in Contoocook village. The middle school is combined with Hopkinton High School in Contoocook village, which serves seventh through twelfth graders, and its sports teams are nicknamed the Hawks.

The town of Hopkinton also includes The Beech Hill School, an independent middle school serving grades 6th through 8th.

== Notable people ==
- Rose Flanders Bascom (1880–1915), first American female lion tamer
- Carlton Chase (1794–1870), bishop of the Episcopal Diocese of New Hampshire
- Alvan Flanders (1825–1894), delegate from the Territory of Washington
- John Williams Gunnison (1812–1853), surveyor with Corps of Topographical Engineers
- Matthew Harvey (1781–1866), lawyer, politician; 13th governor of New Hampshire
- Otto Heino (1915–2009), husband of Vivika, ceramics artist
- Vivika Heino (1910–1995), wife of Otto, ceramics artist
- Frank A. Kimball (1832-1913), businessman and horticulturalist
- John S.C. Knowlton (1798–1871), newspaper editor, publisher, politician
- Annie Kuster (born 1956), former U.S. congresswoman
- Matt Lane (born 1977), middle-distance runner, Maine Running Hall of Famer
- Mary Greenleaf Clement Leavitt (1830–1912), missionary for the Woman's Christian Temperance Union
- Stephen Harriman Long (1784–1864), engineer, explorer, inventor
- David Luneau (born 1965), Democratic member of the New Hampshire House of Representatives
- John Lynch (born 1952), 80th governor of New Hampshire
- Susan Lynch, First Lady of New Hampshire to John Lynch
- Joab N. Patterson (1835-1923), politician, brevet brigadier general
- George H. Perkins (1836–1899), Commodore for the United States Navy
- Isabel Weld Perkins (1876–1948), Boston area heiress, author and daughter of George H. Perkins
- Elizabeth Wentworth Roberts (1871–1927), painter; founder of the Concord Art Association
- Don Rondo (1930–2011), singer
- Tina Satter, New York City-based playwright and director
- Irene Shepard (1922–2014), educator, politician
- David Souter (1939–2025), former associate justice of the US Supreme Court
- Clinton Warrington Stanley (1830-1884), lawyer, judge, New Hampshire Supreme Court justice
- Richard Sylla, writer, professor
- Susan Ware (born 1950), writer and editor at the American National Biography
- Grace Fletcher Webster (1781-1828), first wife of Daniel Webster
- Becky Whitley (born 1980), former New Hampshire state senator

== National Register of Historic Places ==
| | Name on the Register | Image | Date listed | Location | City or town | Description |
|---|---|---|---|---|---|---|
| 1 | Contoocook Railroad Depot | Contoocook Railroad Depot | March 16, 2006 (#06000131) | 896 Main St. 43°13′21″N 71°42′47″W | Contoocook Village | Owned by the Contoocook Riverway Association |
| 2 | Hopkinton Railroad Covered Bridge | Hopkinton Railroad Covered Bridge | January 11, 1980 (#80000294) | Off NH 103 and NH 127; 43°13′23″N 71°42′51″W | Contoocook Village | Over Contoocook River in village of Contoocook |
| 3 | Howe-Quimby House | Howe-Quimby House | June 27, 1980 (#80000295) | 862 Sugar Hill Rd. 43°09′29″N 71°42′03″W | Hopkinton | |
| 4 | William H. Long Memorial | William H. Long Memorial | July 15, 1977 (#77000092) | 300 Main St. 43°11′27″N 71°40′19″W | Hopkinton Village | Now houses the Hopkinton Historical Society. |
| 5 | Rowell's Covered Bridge | Rowell's Covered Bridge | November 21, 1976 (#76000129) | Clement Hill Rd. 43°11′33″N 71°44′54″W | West Hopkinton | Over Contoocook River |
| 6 | Stanley Tavern | Stanley Tavern | September 7, 2005 (#05000970) | 371 Main St. 43°11′29″N 71°40′27″W | Hopkinton Village | |

== Sites of interest ==
- Hopkinton Historical Society
- First Congregational Church of Hopkinton
- Contoocook Depot and Restored Pullman Passenger Coach
- Contoocook Railroad Bridge
- Rowell's Covered Bridge
- Perkins Manor
- Howe-Quimby House
- Stanley Tavern
- St. Methodios Faith and Heritage Center
- Concord-Lake Sunapee Rail Trail
