= Stanley Tavern =

- U.S. National Register of Historic Places
- NH State Register of Historic Places
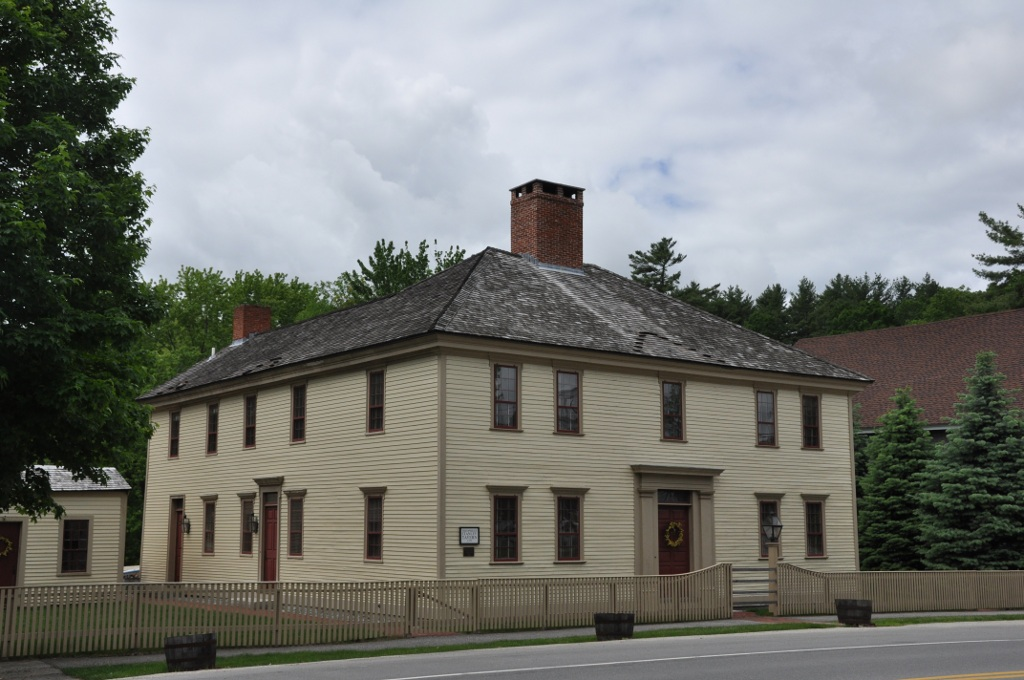

- Location within New Hampshire Location within the United States
- Location: 371 Main St., Hopkinton, New Hampshire
- Coordinates: 43°11′29″N 71°40′27″W
- Area: 0.5 acres (0.20 ha)
- Built: 1791
- Built by: Stanley, Theophilus
- Architectural style: Georgian
- NRHP reference No.: 05000970

Significant dates
- Added to NRHP: September 7, 2005
- Designated NHSRHP: January 28, 2002

The Stanley Tavern is a historic tavern building at 371 Main Street in Hopkinton, New Hampshire, United States. The oldest portion of this Georgian wood-frame structure was built c. 1791 by Theophilus Stanley, to serve as a tavern in the town, which was at the time vying (unsuccessfully, as it turned out) with Concord to be the state capital. It is the only surviving tavern of three that were known to be present in the town in the late 18th and early 19th century. The building was listed on the National Register of Historic Places in 2005, and the New Hampshire State Register of Historic Places in 2002.

== Description and history ==
Stanley Tavern is located in the village center of Hopkinton, on the south side of Main Street (U.S. Route 202). It is a 2½-story wood-frame structure, with a hip roof and clapboarded exterior. The building originally consisted of a typical five bay wide, two bay deep, Georgian house with a central chimney, to which a single story kitchen wing with rear chimney was built on. Around 1800 the roof of the kitchen wing was raised to a full two stories. A two-story wing added in 1875 was demolished during restoration of the property in the early 2000s.

The oldest portion of the tavern was built in 1791 by Theophilus Stanley (1766–1827). Located next to the hall where the state legislature met in 1798, 1801, 1806, and 1807, it was one of at least three taverns that catered to the legislators during their sessions, and is the only one still standing. The building served as a tavern until 1864, and has since gone through a variety of commercial and residential uses. The property distinctively includes a shed that is as old as the main house.

== See also ==
- National Register of Historic Places listings in Merrimack County, New Hampshire
