= Contoocook Railroad Depot =

- U.S. National Register of Historic Places
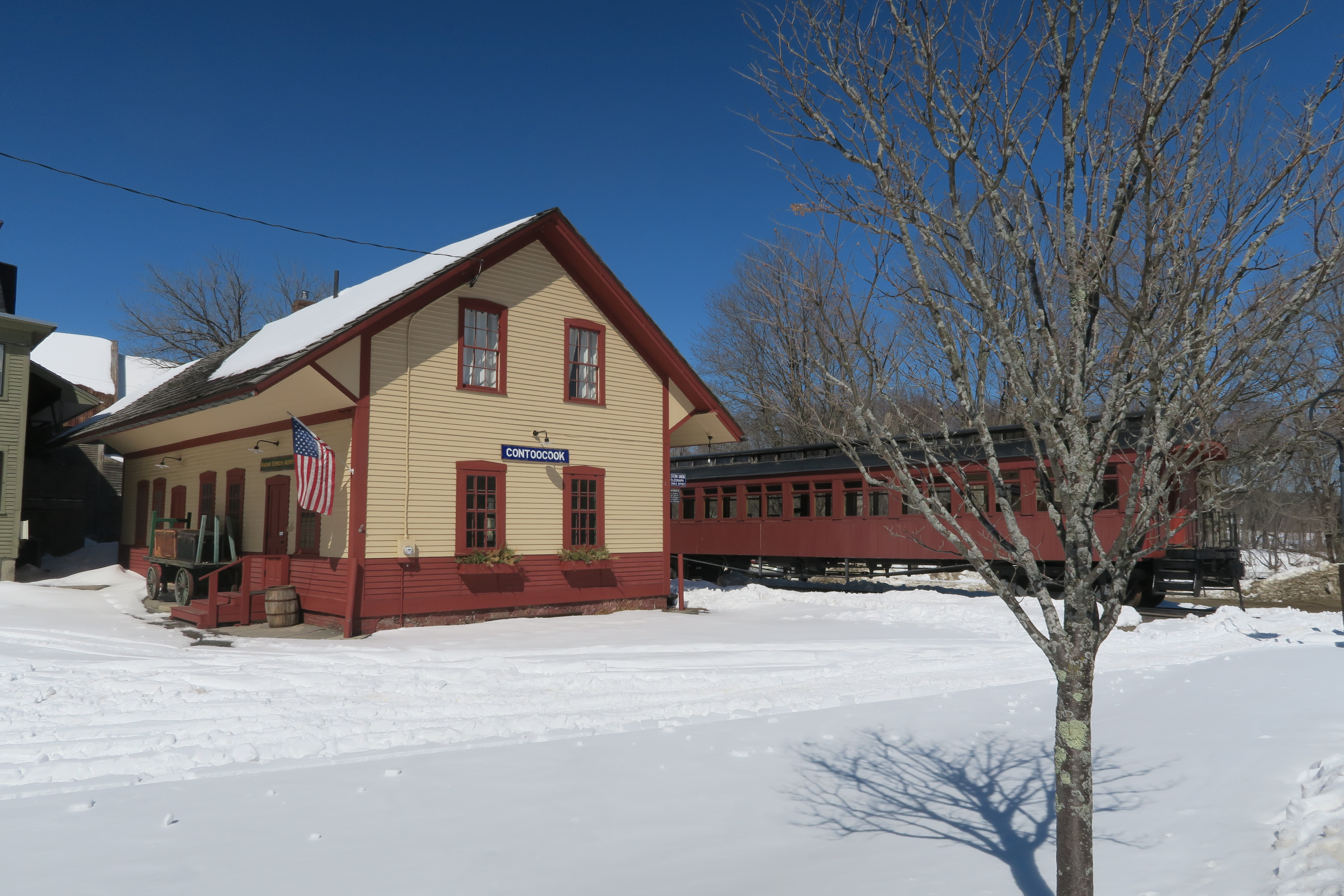
- Contoocook Railroad Depot with 1907 passenger coach

- Location within New Hampshire Location within the United States
- Location: 896 Main Street, Contoocook, NH 03229; Off NH 103 and NH 127; Hopkinton, New Hampshire (village of Contoocook)
- Coordinates: 43°13′21″N 71°42′47″W
- Built: 1849-50, renovated 1999–2013
- Architectural style: Mid-Nineteenth Century Two Story Wooden Frame
- Website: www.contoocookdepot.com
- NRHP reference No.: 06000131
- Added to NRHP: March 16, 2006

The Contoocook Railroad Depot is located in Hopkinton, New Hampshire, United States, in the village of Contoocook. The depot was completed in 1849 as one of the first substantial railroad passenger stations west of Concord on the Concord and Claremont Railroad. The building is one of the best preserved of a small number of gable-roofed railroad stations surviving from the first decade of rail development in New Hampshire. The station exemplifies the pioneering period of rail development in the state.

It is one of the earliest and least altered depots of the 1850 period in New Hampshire. Displaying the Greek Revival style, with modifications that proclaim its identity as a new building type, the depot is an important artifact in the history and evolution of railroad architecture in New Hampshire.

== Architectural significance ==
Because the Concord and Claremont Railroad remained a small and under-capitalized short line, with minimal investment, the Contoocook Depot has survived as one of a very small group of comparable structures. Other comparable depots on the Concord and Claremont line, and on its sister Contoocook Valley Railroad, have disappeared. Very similar stations once stood at West Concord and Bradford, but no longer exist. The Contoocook Valley Railroad, built at the same time as the Concord and Claremont by the same builder, Joseph Barnard (and joining the latter just west of the Contoocook Depot), once had nearly identical depots. The destroyed station at Hillsborough Bridge in Hillsborough, the original terminus of the Contoocook Valley Railroad, was a virtual twin to the Contoocook Depot. Like the Contoocook and Warner buildings, it measured twenty-four by fifty feet.

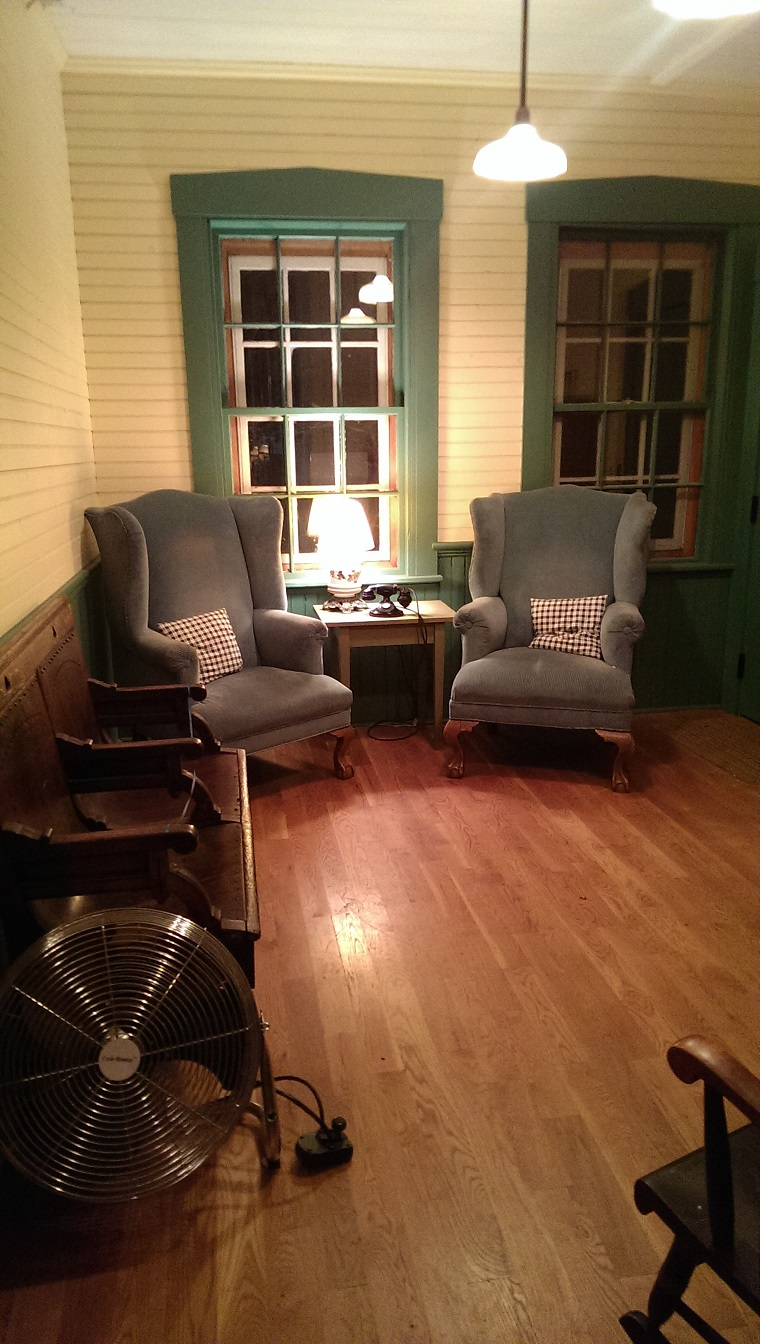
Ladies Waiting Room fully restored to 1910 era

== Transportation significance ==
Throughout the period from 1849 to 1960, the Contoocook Depot was the commercial hub of Contoocook Village. The building not only served as the point of arrival and departure for travelers to and from the village, but also offered other forms of communication. The railway mail was delivered here, and for some years the depot served as the Contoocook Post Office. The depot was connected to the remainder of the consolidated Boston and Maine system by the railway telegraph, and also served the public as the local public telegraph office from 1866. The depot was connected to the Western Union system during the early twentieth century. When the first telephone connections were installed in Contoocook Village in 1884, one of two telephone offices was at the depot, with Amos H. Currier as agent.

At first, rail connections from Contoocook largely focused on Concord. Travelers going east from Contoocook were able to connect to the Concord Railroad, thereby gaining rail access to Manchester, Nashua, Lowell, and Boston; or to the Northern Railroad, providing access to all towns on the route from Concord to West Lebanon on the Connecticut River and to White River Junction, Vermont; or to the Boston, Concord, and Montreal Railroad, thereby gaining access to Woodsville on the Connecticut River and to Wells River, Vermont.

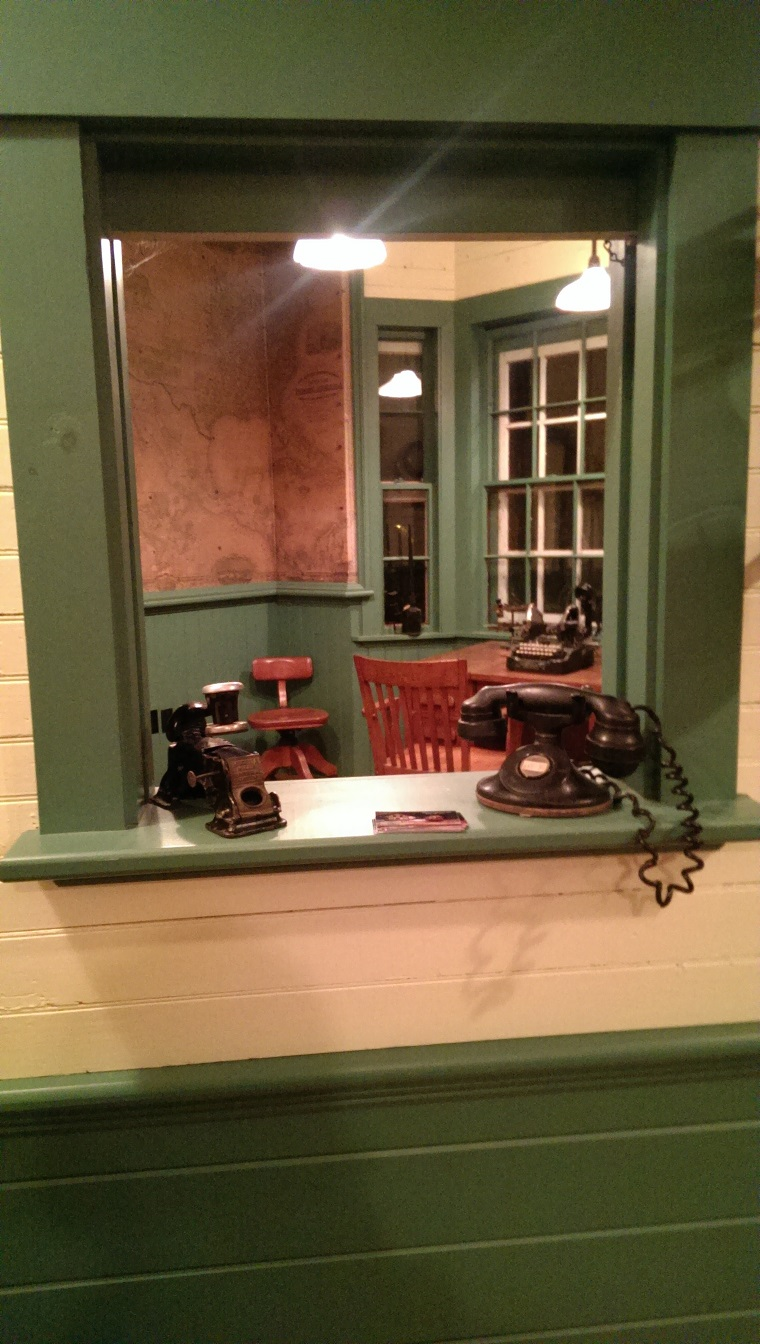
Ticket agent window fully restored to 1910 era

Trains traveling northwesterly on the Concord and Claremont Railroad's own tracks were limited at first by the tracks' termination in Bradford, which was reached in July 1850. Not until the Newbury Cut was completed in 1871 were trains at last able to travel to Newport and finally, in 1872, to make contact with the Connecticut River at Claremont on the railroad's own tracks. Similarly, the Contoocook Valley Railroad, which connected with the Concord and Claremont in Contoocook, was initially completed only as far south as Hillsborough Bridge in Hillsborough.

By 1858, H. F. Waiting's Map of Merrimack County showed many manufactories and shops in Contoocookville. Among them were Kimball's carpenter shop, Osgood's carpenter shop, Merrill's cooper shop, Joab and David N. Patterson's woolen mill, Burnham and Brown's sawmill, grist mill, and shingle mill, a carriage shop, a mackerel kit manufactory, another sawmill, a blacksmith shop, and Abbott's hot houses. The compact part of the village also included two schoolhouses and the Contoocook Academy. By that time, the railroad depot was accompanied by a freight house, and the map implies that the building later known as the Kirk Building, which stands adjacent to the railroad station, was then owned by the railroad. As noted, the Contoocook Depot was located at the junction of the lines of two initially separate railroad corporations. A summary history of the incorporation and merger of the two lines that met near the depot is given in a description of the Concord and Claremont Railroad in the Thirty- Fifth Annual Report of the Railroad Commissioners of the State of New Hampshire (1879): This road is the outcome of a long series of conflicting and unsuccessful railroad schemes.

The depot was the local office for Railway and American Express companies. Standing at the junction of the Concord and Claremont and the Contoocook Valley Railroad lines, the Contoocook Depot also served as the focus of a small but very active rail service center. The Schedule of Property Transferred by the Northern Railroad to the Boston & Lowell Railroad Corporation, Under Lease, In Effect June 1, 1884, shows that the Contoocook rail center then contained the following buildings: the depot, measuring 25 by 50 feet (7.6 by 15.2 m); a depot "ell," measuring 13 by 24 feet (4.0 by 7.3 m); a freight house, measuring 34 by 50 feet (10 by 15 m); an engine house, measuring 21 by 50 feet (6.4 by 15.2 m); a water house, measuring 15 by 26 feet (4.6 by 7.9 m); a woodshed, measuring 30 by 147 feet (9.1 by 44.8 m); two hand car houses, each measuring 14 by 18 feet (4.3 by 5.5 m); another hand car house, measuring 12 by 12 feet (3.7 by 3.7 m); and a rail shop. Nearby stood a covered bridge, supported by trusses of Childs' patent; this bridge was replaced by the existing double Town lattice truss railroad bridge in 1889. See Contoocook Railroad Bridge. All of the structures of the Contoocook rail center, with the exception of the depot, freight house, and bridge, had been removed by 1904. The freight house has since disappeared. The engine house and its connected water house are shown in a surviving photograph that can be dated between 1884 and 1887 by the presence of a Boston and Lowell Railroad locomotive. The locations of the engine house and wood house are shown on a Sanborn Insurance Company map of 1892.

== Contoocook Riverway Association ==
The Contoocook Riverway Association is a 501(c)(3) nonprofit organization founded in 1999 that owns the railroad depot, train car and property. The organization was founded by an initial board of directors with a President, Vice President, Treasurer, Secretary and additional board members.

== Renovations ==
During the summer of 2002, an extensive renovation project was undertaken to restore the historic Contoocook Railroad Depot and covered railroad bridge to their 1910 appearances. "When you came to Contoocook, you came on the rail," said Chip Chesley, past President of the Contoocook Riverway Association, the non-profit that handled the project. "This was the village's front door and it just seemed natural that it should be restored for the public to enjoy."

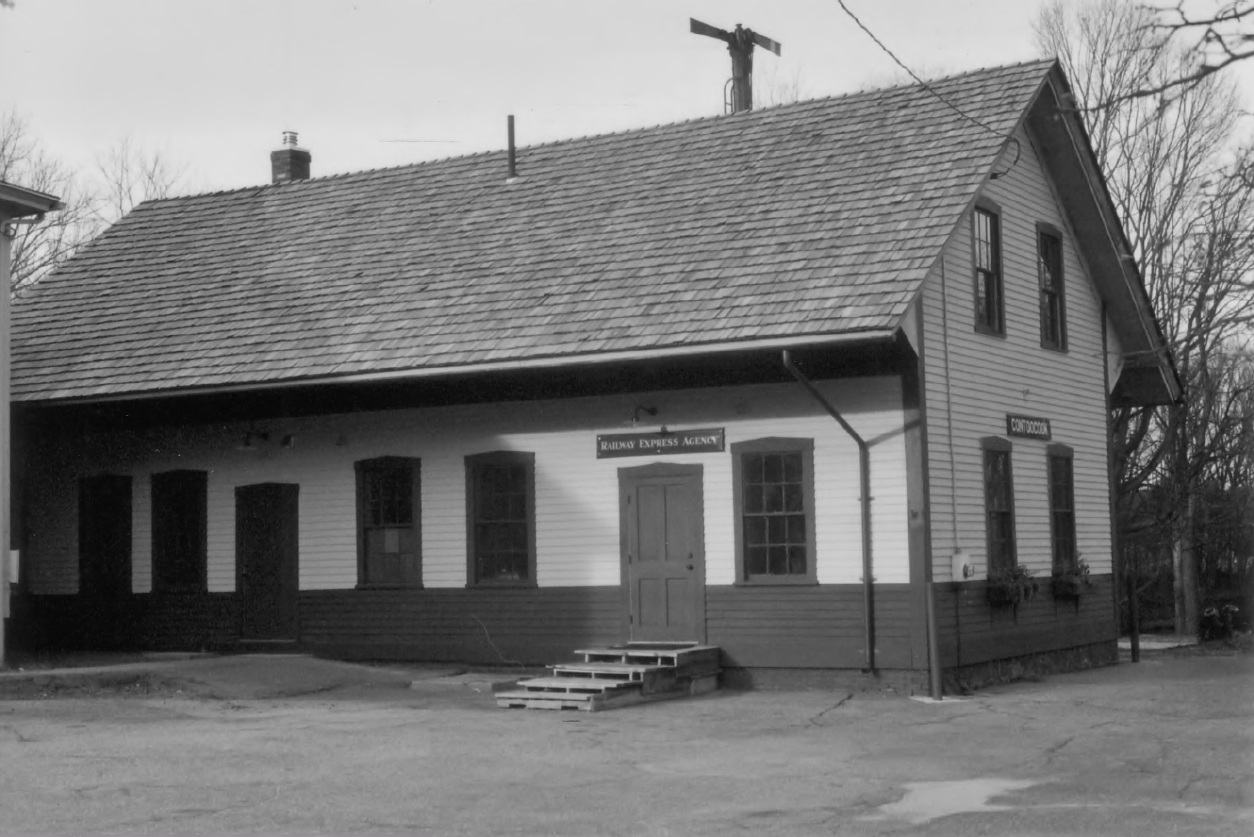
Contoocook Railroad Depot after renovations completed in 2005

The Contoocook Riverway Association bought the depot from the town of Hopkinton for one silver dollar in 1999. The covered bridge, which is on the National Register of Historic Places, is owned by the State of New Hampshire. The $400,000 restoration project was funded by federal grants administered through the State Department of Transportation and by community donations. The journey took approximately three years. Restoration of the depot building was first - the roof stripped and replaced with wooden shingles that resembled the roof until the 1930s. New exterior siding and paint, followed by the sandblasting and painting of the train signal, or semaphore, brought the building's look back nearly a century.

The depot's surviving interior details include two ticket windows and most of the original walls and ceilings, still covered with tongue-and-groove paneling common in the late 19th century. Over the years, many original items have been returned to the depot by the community such as the enameled blue "Contoocook" station sign, luggage cart, seating bench, and other irreplaceable items.

In 2007, a wooden Pullman Passenger Coach was donated to the Contoocook Riverway Association and placed on rails behind the depot, as if ready to pass through the bridge once again.

== Current use ==
The depot currently serves as a museum and visitor center. It is open weekends and some week days. Second floor renovations taking place in 2013 have included a meeting room, museum displays, historic document archives and an additional bathroom. The building contains an elevator indoors for handicapped access to the second floor.

== See also ==
- Official website
- National Register of Historic Places listings in Merrimack County, New Hampshire
