= Contoocook Railroad Bridge =

- Hopkinton Railroad Covered Bridge
- U.S. National Register of Historic Places
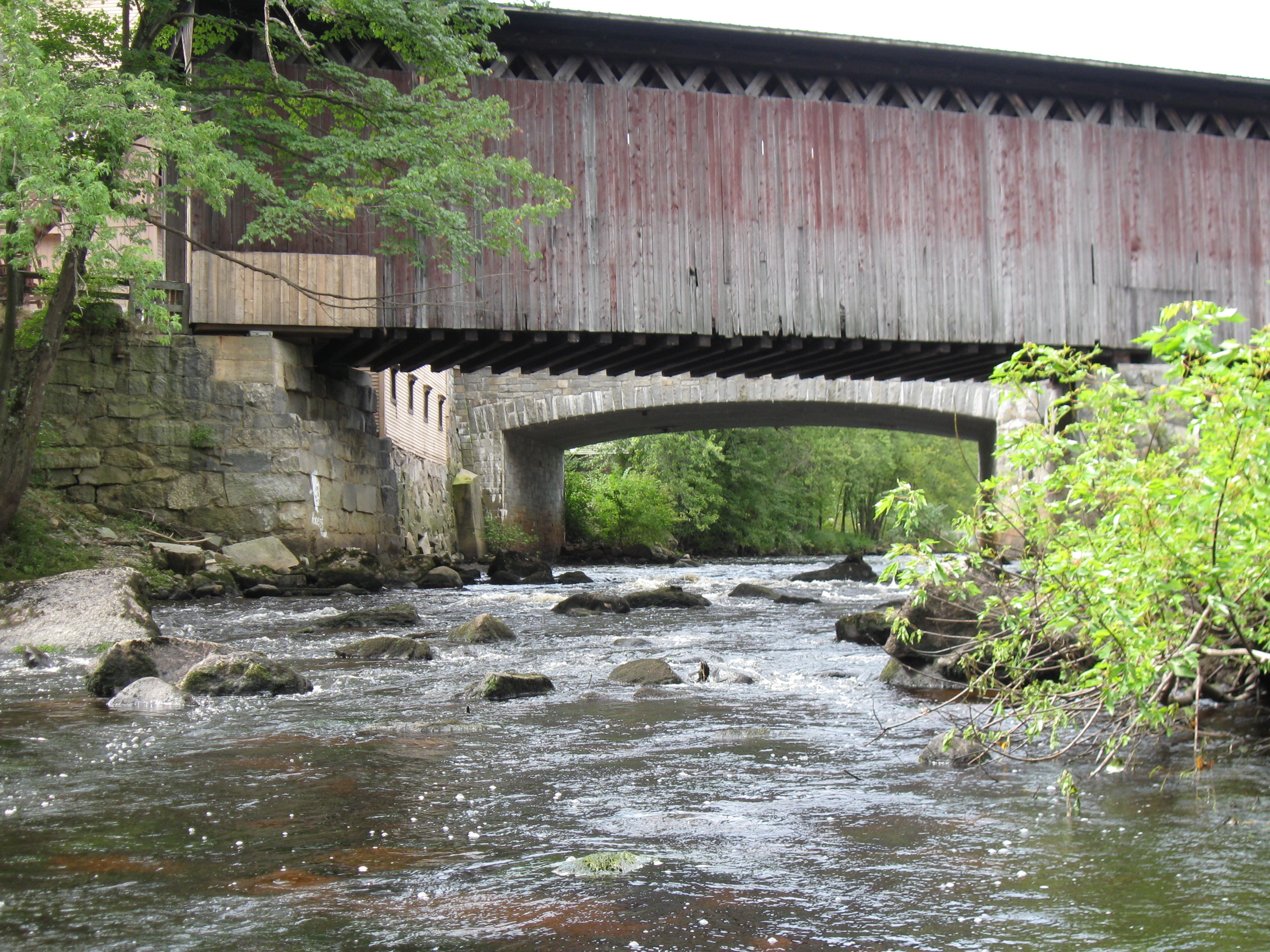

- Location within New Hampshire Location within the United States
- Location: Off NH 103 and NH 127; Hopkinton, New Hampshire (village of Contoocook)
- Coordinates: 43°13′23″N 71°42′50″W
- Built: 1849-50, rebuilt 1889
- Architectural style: Doubled Town lattice truss
- NRHP reference No.: 80000294
- Added to NRHP: January 11, 1980

The Contoocook Railroad Bridge is a covered bridge on the former Contoocook Valley (first Concord & Claremont, later Boston & Maine) Railroad line spanning the Contoocook River in the center of the village of Contoocook, New Hampshire, United States. It is referred to in the National Register of Historic Places as the Hopkinton Railroad Covered Bridge, for the town of Hopkinton, New Hampshire, in which the village of Contoocook is located.

Built in the 19th century, it is the oldest extant covered railroad bridge in the United States and served rail traffic until 1960. It was used as a warehouse until 1989, then became public property, and has been preserved by the state, donations, and volunteers, in association with the nearby historic railroad depot.

== History ==
Originally built between 1849 and 1850, the bridge was substantially re-built in 1889 to replace the lighter covered railroad bridge. Having been built by the former Concord and Claremont Railroad (acquired by the Boston & Maine Railroad in 1887), the bridge is the oldest of four surviving double-web Town lattice railroad bridges, and is the oldest extant covered railroad bridge in the United States. (The others double Towns are Pier Bridge, Newport, New Hampshire, 1907; Wright's Bridge, Newport, NH, 1906; and Fisher Bridge, Wolcott, Vermont, 1908.) The re-built bridge was probably designed by Boston & Maine Railroad engineer Jonathan Parker Snow (1848–1933) and built by carpenter David Hazelton (1832–1908). Under Snow, the Boston & Maine utilized wooden bridges on its branch lines longer than any other major railroad, the last of these constructed in 1916. The nearby Contoocook Railroad Depot was built in 1850 on the earlier Concord & Claremont Railroad.

The bridge presents the clearest, most original structure of its type, as the others incorporate significant structural modifications. The main trusses are double Town lattice and are continuous over a central pier to form two spans of approximately 71 feet (22 m) each. It has reportedly been said that they were "built by the mile and cut off by the yard." The center pier is skewed to match the river flow, as are the abutments. This is because the bridge spans the river on a bias.

The bridge was in use as a railroad bridge until 1962, survived a flood in 1936, a hurricane in 1938, and was moved off its foundations twice during its lifespan and saved from being completely washed down river by the rail tracks running through it. Following its railroad service, it functioned as a warehouse between 1962 and 1989.

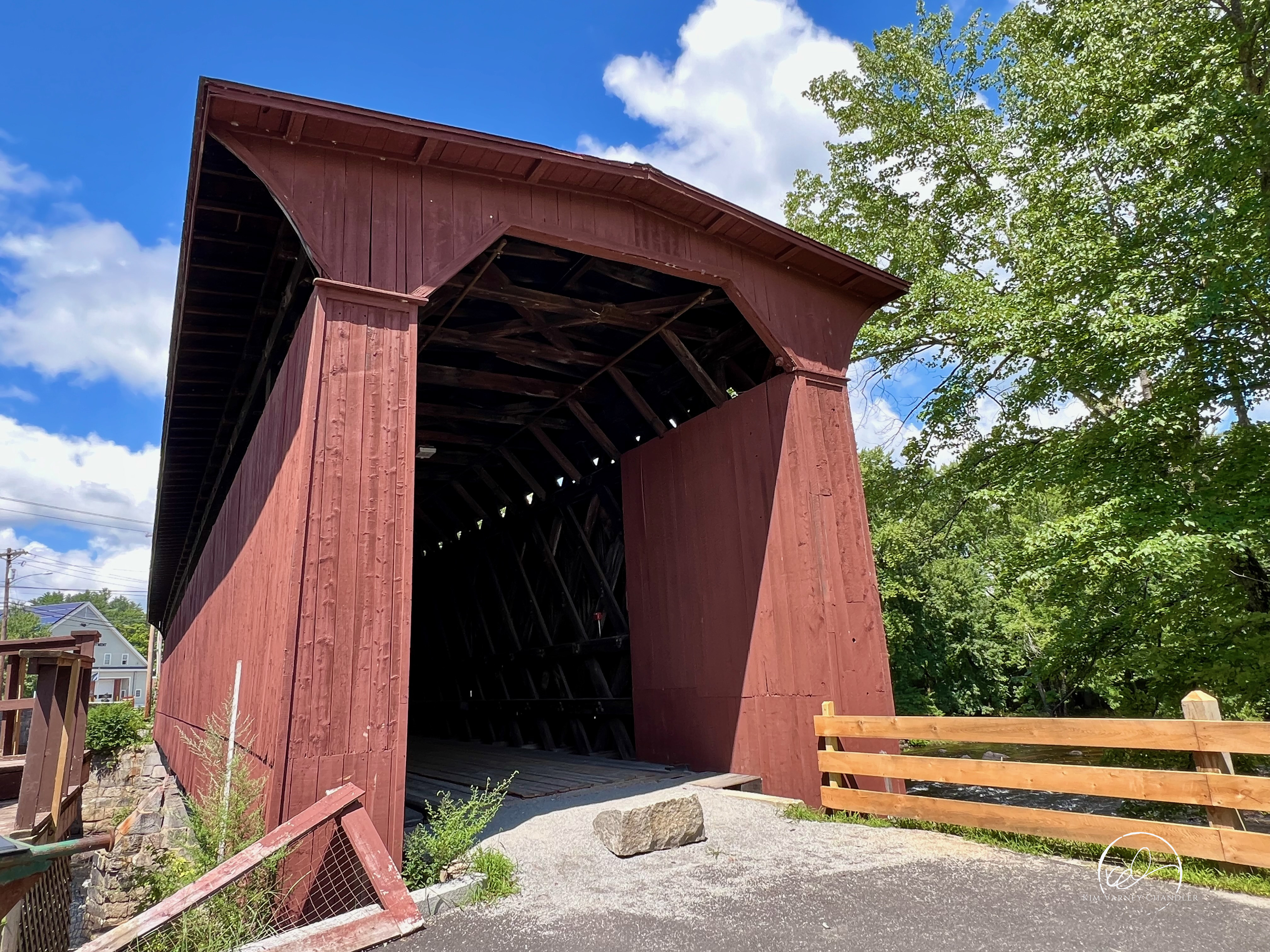
Contoocook Railroad Bridge 2024

== Renovations ==
Article published in The Old Stone Wall, Fall 2003, distributed by the State of New Hampshire, Division of Cultural Resources, Division of Historical Resources:

Major work began in August on the state-owned Contoocook Covered Railroad Bridge. The National Society for the Preservation of Covered Bridges has employed Tim Andrews, proprietor of Barns and Bridges of New England, to lift the four sagging corners of the bridge and replace decayed bed timbers. The Society is donating the cost of Andrews' work from its Eastman Thomas Fund. The span is under the administrative care of the Division of Historical Resources, which has no capital budget for its maintenance. Over the past decade, the National Society has donated repairs to the side sheathing and flat metal roof of the bridge, purchased fire retardant chemicals for the wooden span, and provided countless hours of volunteer labor in maintaining the bridge. For the current building campaign, Tim Andrews has brought heavy steel I-beams (lent by the New Hampshire Department of Transportation) from his last job, the award-winning restoration of the Bog Covered Bridge in Andover. Andrews also hopes to straighten some of the kinks that the bridge acquired when it was tipped off its abutments in the flood of 1936 and again in the hurricane of 1938. Contoocook Bridge is one of three surviving covered bridges on the Concord and Claremont rail line. Two others, in western Newport, are also state-owned, but are administered as trail crossings by the Department of Resources and Economic Development (DRED). Together, the three remaining Concord and Claremont Branch bridges are among the most remarkable of the eight covered railroad bridges that survive in the world. The 1889 Contoocook Bridge is the oldest of the eight; Pier Bridge (1907) in Newport is the longest; and Wright's Bridge (1906) in Newport is the only surviving double Town lattice truss railroad bridge with integral laminated wood plank arches. Recognizing this rarity, the Historic American Engineering Record (HAER) selected Contoocook Bridge and its sister span, Wright's Bridge, for detailed study and recordation this summer. After it ceased to serve rail traffic in 1960, the Contoocook Bridge was owned by a succession of private individuals. The bridge became the property of the Town of Hopkinton (Contoocook is a village in Hopkinton) in 1989. Not wanting to own and maintain the span, Hopkinton offered the bridge to the State of New Hampshire. Governor Judd Gregg and the executive council accepted the gift in 1990. Under state law, the Division of Historical Resources becomes administratively responsible for any historic covered bridge that is donated to the state by a municipality. Without a capital budget, DHR has depended almost entirely on the National Society for the Preservation of Covered Bridges for financial help in maintaining the bridge. DHR has also partnered with the Contoocook Riverway Association, which owns the nearby Contoocook Railroad Depot (1850). Together, the Association and DHR have won a Transportation Enhancement grant for restoration of the bridge and the railroad station. Once the bridge is securely underpinned, DHR will combine Transportation Enhancement grant funds and Conservation License Plate ("Moose Plate") revenues to install a fire sprinkler system in the bridge, paint the exterior using an authentic Boston and Maine Railroad paint formula, and install interpretive signage and interior security lighting.

– James L. Garvin, State Architectural Historian, Sept. 2003

In 2006 the bridge saw minor structural repairs to its bottom chord at the upstream north corner, the bolsters were replaced for the first time since the hurricane of 1938, and the bed timbers were replaced by granite pedestals. The work was paid for by a donation from the National Society for the Preservation of Covered Bridges.

The bridge underwent slight alterations being completed mid-winter 2009-2010 which consisted of a dry-head, open pipe sprinkler system for the bridge interior with exterior fire department connection, including linear heat detectors, fire alarm system, fire retardant coating and LED motion sensor lighting inside the bridge at an approximate cost of $123,300 paid for and engineered by the New Hampshire Department of Transportation.

In April 2019, bridge work to stain the bridge and make minor repairs took place. The project was funded by the state's "Moose Plate" grant program. Volunteers from the town's 250th anniversary committee as well as the Contoocook Riverway Association had dedicated time and efforts to see the project through.

== Gallery ==
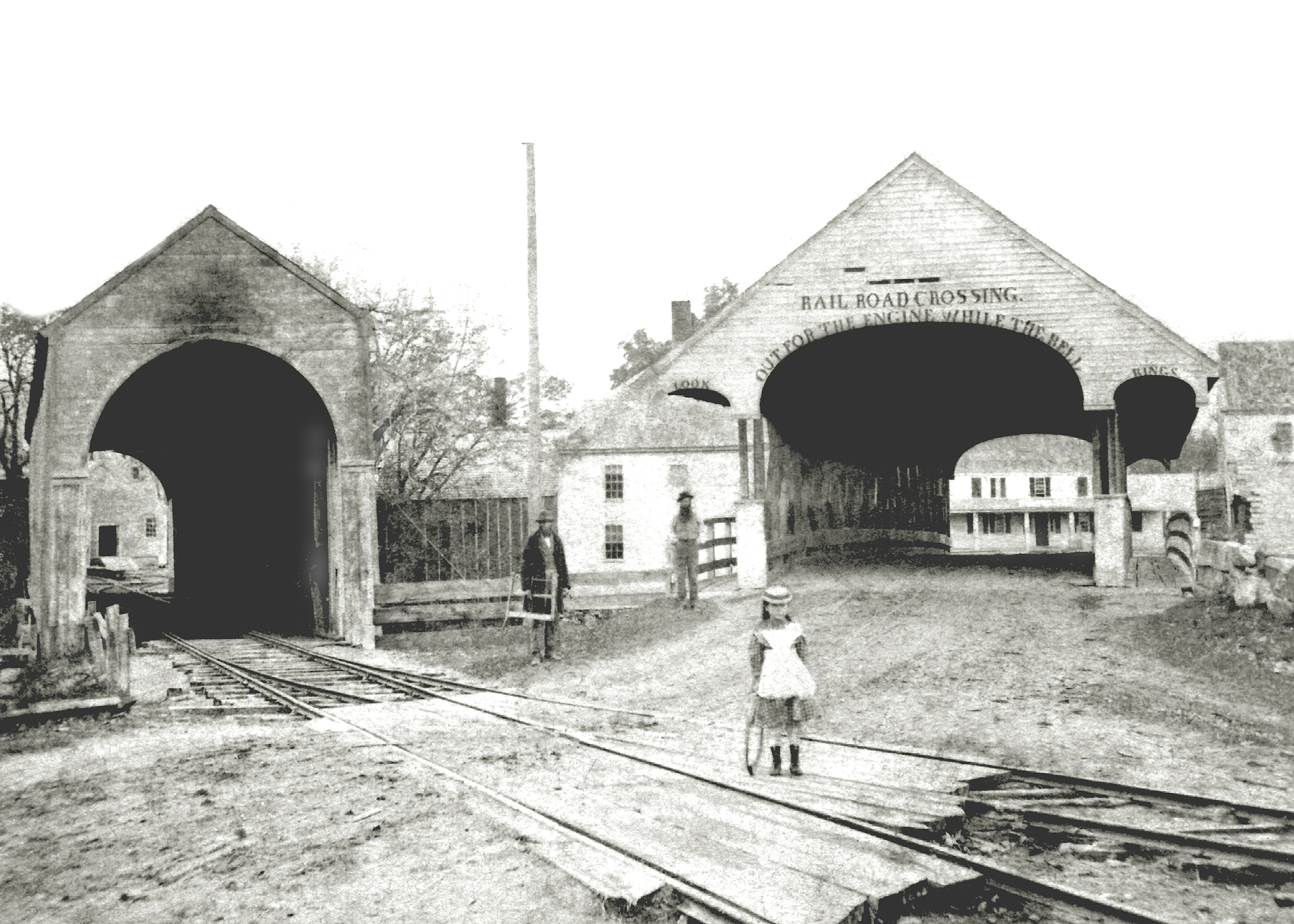
Original covered railroad bridge (left) and covered highway bridge (right)

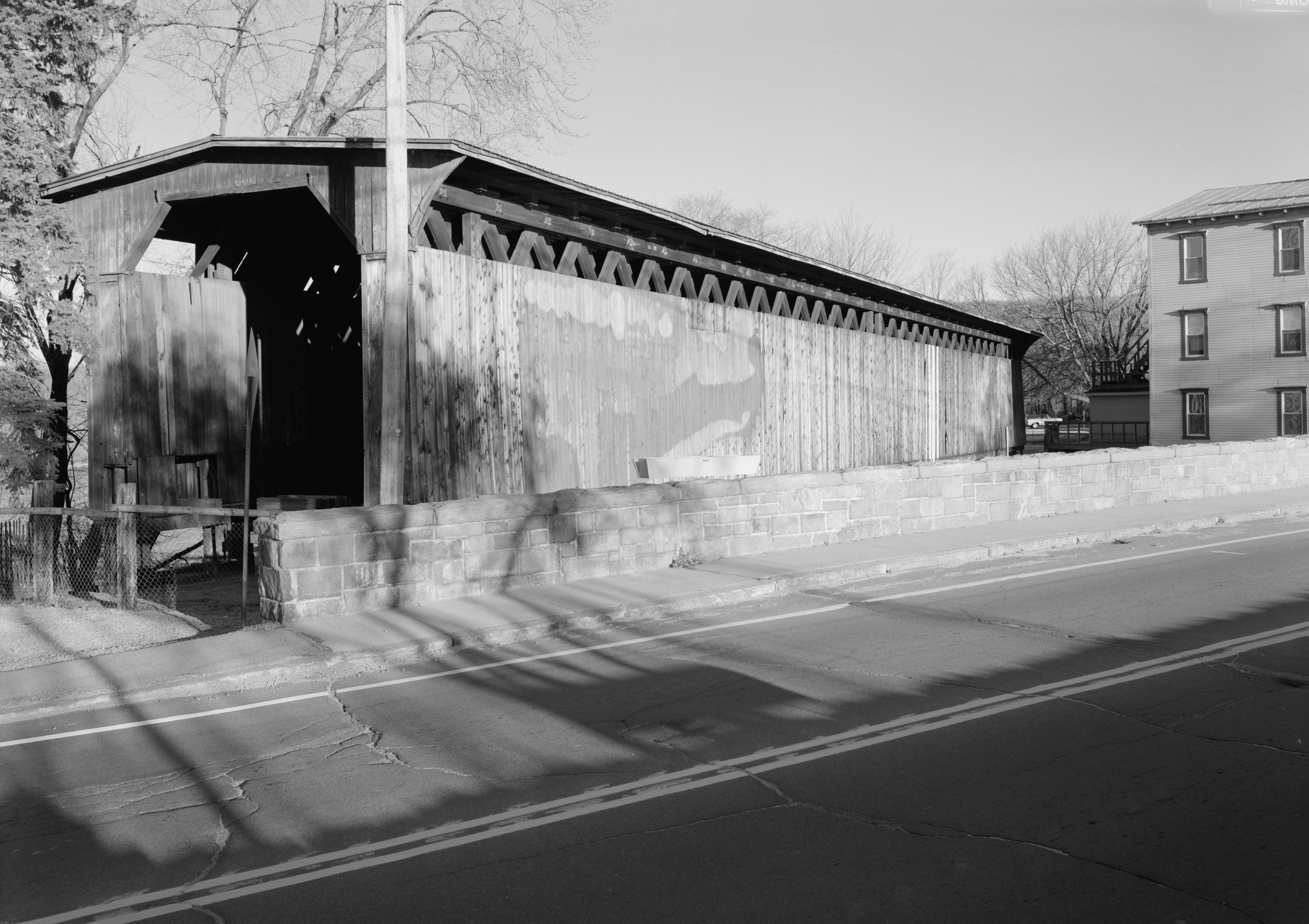
HAER exterior view by Jet Lowe, 2003

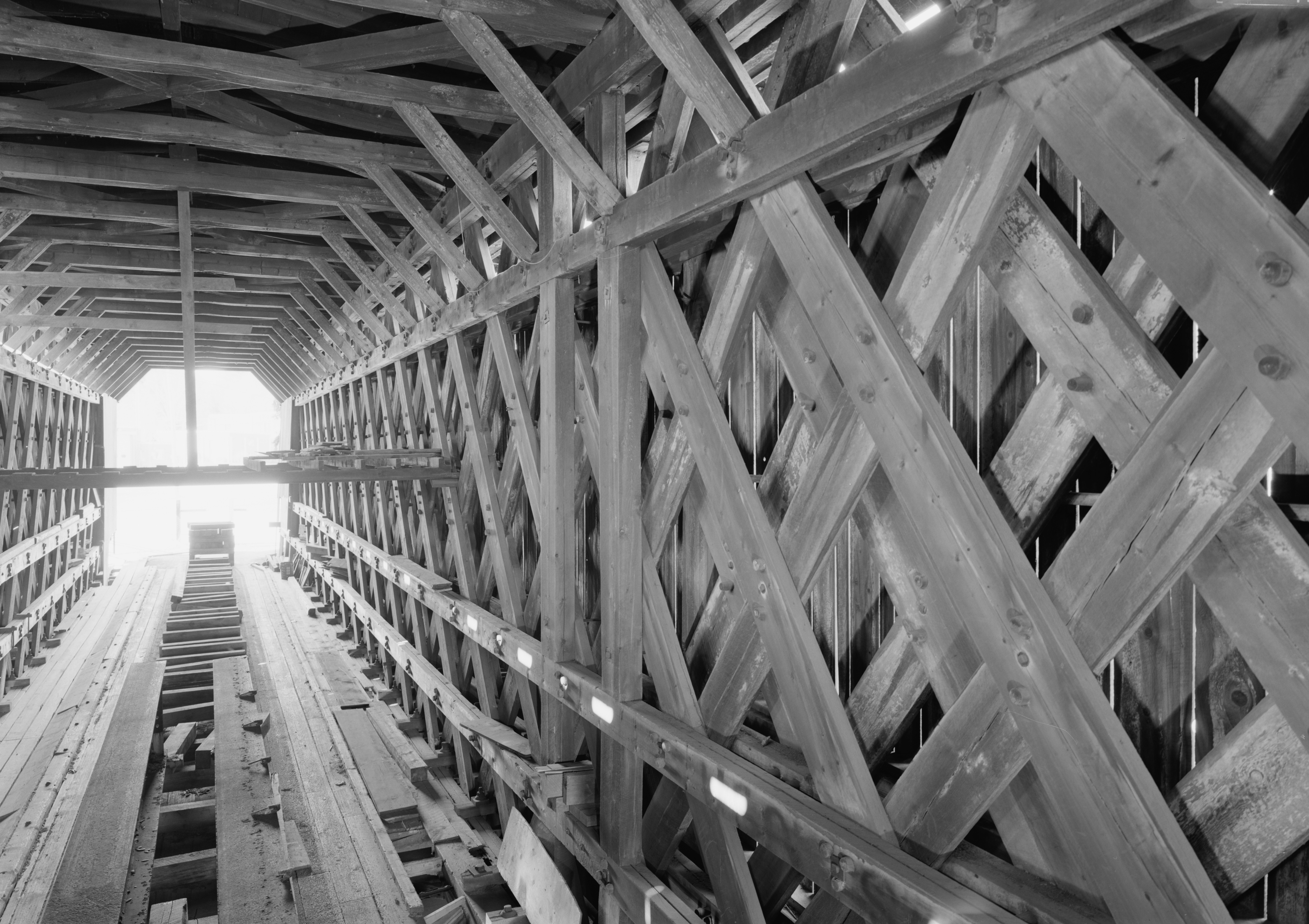
HAER interior view by Jet Lowe, 2003

== See also ==
- List of bridges documented by the Historic American Engineering Record in New Hampshire
- List of bridges on the National Register of Historic Places in New Hampshire
- National Register of Historic Places listings in Merrimack County, New Hampshire
- New Hampshire Historical Marker No. 195: Contoocook Railroad Bridge and Depot
