= Hopkinton High School (New Hampshire) =

Coordinates: 43°13′48.7″N 71°43′06.9″W

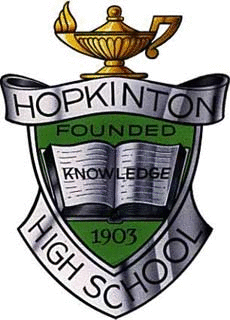
- School seal
- 297 Park Avenue, Hopkinton, New Hampshire; USA

Information
- Type: Public
- Established: 1903
- Principal: Christopher Kelley
- Teaching staff: 23.30 (FTE)
- Grades: 9-12
- Enrollment: 300 (2023-2024)
- Student to teacher ratio: 12.88
- Campus type: Suburban
- Colors: Green and white
- Mascot: Hawk
- Accreditation: NEASC
- Website: Hopkinton High School

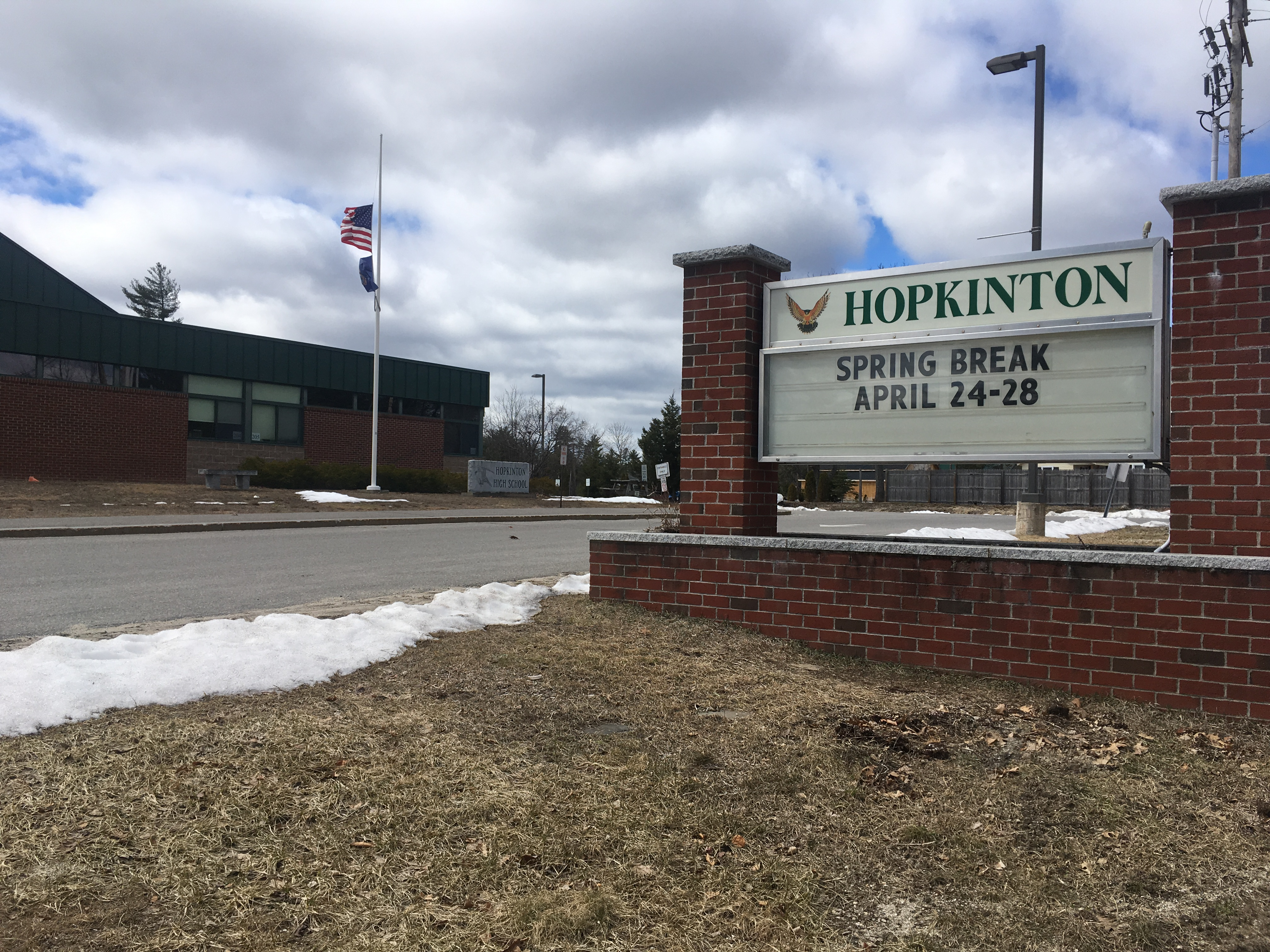
Front of the high school with school signs

Hopkinton High School is a public, co-educational secondary school located in Hopkinton, New Hampshire. In 2014, 2015, and 2016 it was ranked 1st among New Hampshire's public schools by US News. Hopkinton High School has also been awarded a national silver medal and is ranked nationally #972 of the 21,000 public schools in the US.

== Notable alumni ==
- Tina Satter, New York City-based playwright and director

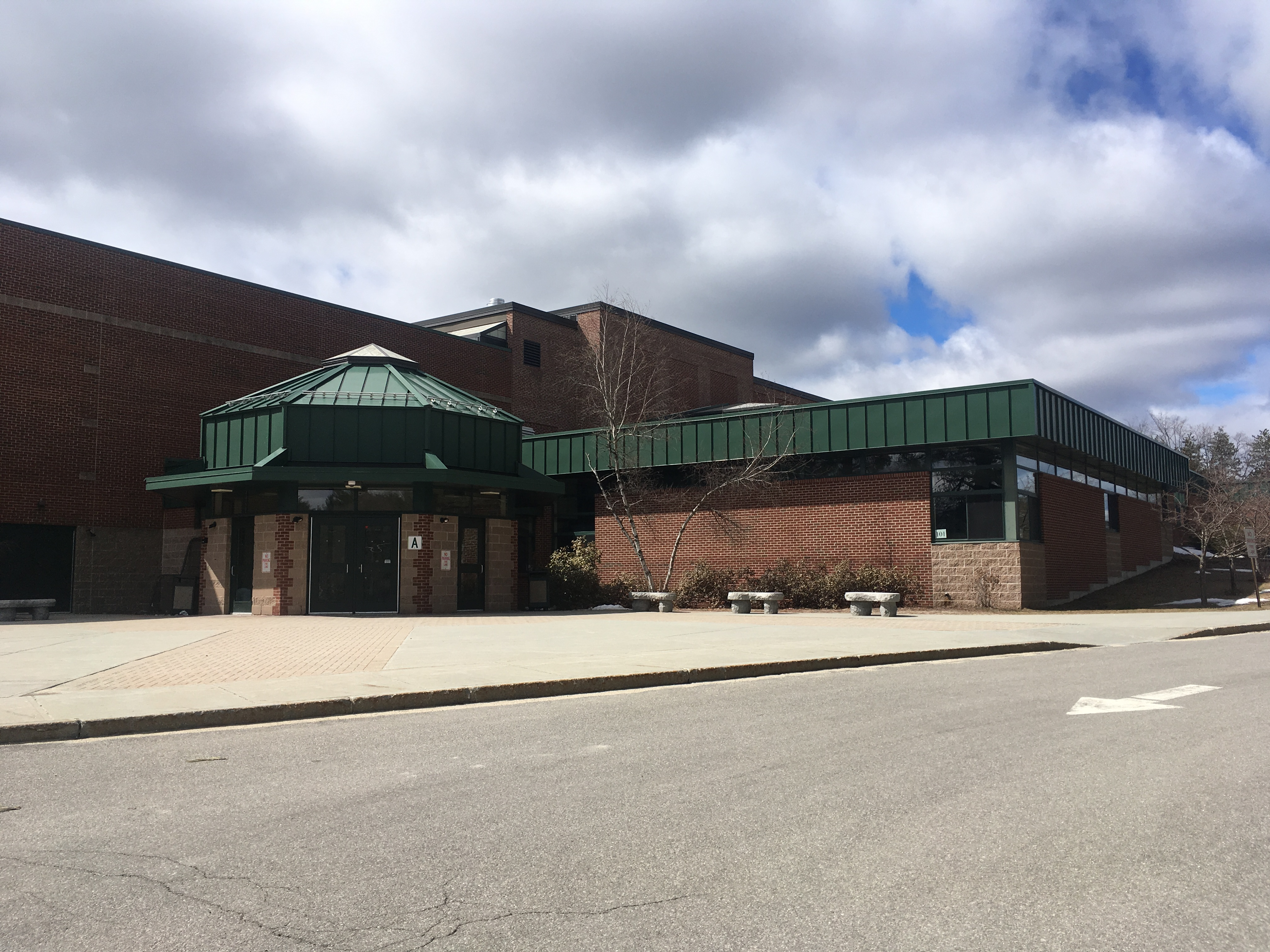
Front main entrance to the high school.
