= The Meetinghouse =

Historic house in New Hampshire, United States

- U.S. National Register of Historic Places
- U.S. Historic district – Contributing property
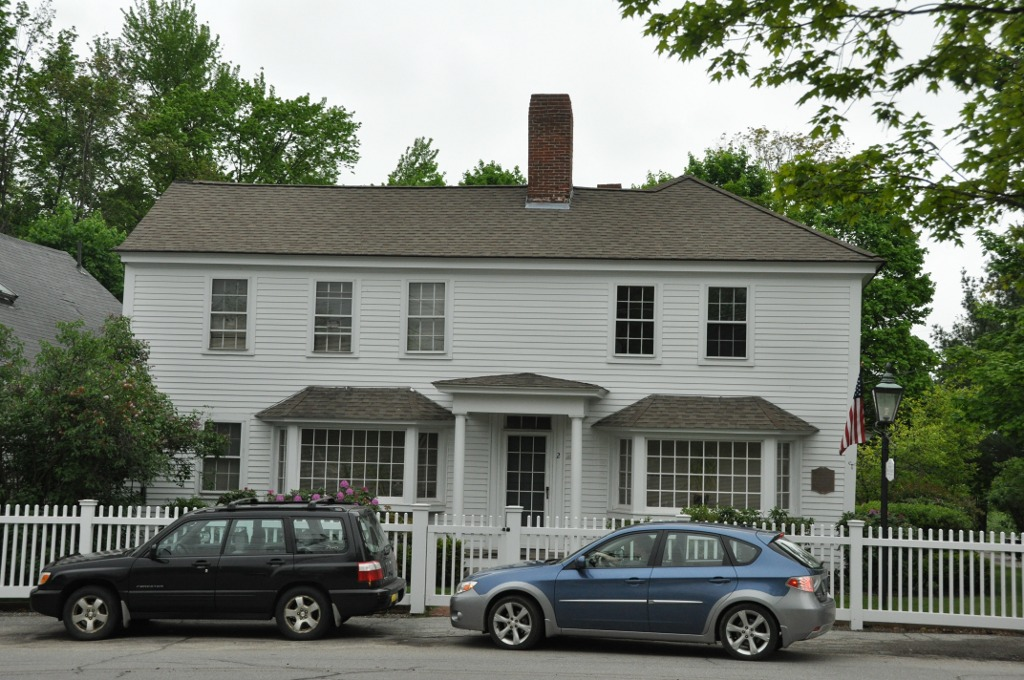

- Location within New Hampshire Location within the United States
- Location: Monument Sq., Hollis, New Hampshire
- Coordinates: 42°44′22″N 71°35′18″W
- Area: 0.5 acres (0.20 ha)
- Built: 1744
- Architectural style: Georgian saltbox
- Part of: Hollis Village Historic District (ID01000204)
- NRHP reference No.: 82001683

Significant dates
- Added to NRHP: March 11, 1982
- Designated CP: March 2, 2001

The Meetinghouse is a historic house on Monument Square in Hollis, New Hampshire. Built in 1744, its oldest portion is a rare regional example of a Georgian period saltbox house. The structure was extended with a new west-facing facade sometime later, and has seen both residential and commercial use. The house was listed on the National Register of Historic Places in 1982.

== Description and history ==
The Meetinghouse is located on the east side of Monument Square, on the east side of Main Street across Cleasby Lane from Hollis Town Hall. It is a 2½-story wood-frame structure, with an L-shaped plan covered by a cross-gabled roof and clapboarded exterior. The oldest portion of the house was built in 1744, and is a rare regional example of a Georgian saltbox-style house. This portion of the house faces Cleasby Lane, and is two rooms deep on the first floor and one room deep on the second. A second block, oriented to face Monument Square, was attached to this house in the 18th century, as were smaller additions to its east side. A number of alterations have been made to the house, notably the addition of bay windows to the western facade, part of an adaptation of the structure for retail uses.

The house was built for the Reverend Daniel Emerson, the first settled minister in Hollis, and stands on land that was part of the 40-acre (16 ha) ministerial parcel set aside when the town was planned. Emerson at first occupied a log cabin, which burned in April 1744, and the oldest portion of this house was built in preparation for the arrival of his bride. The Emersons had thirteen children, giving a reason for the increase in the house's size in the second half of the 18th century. It remained in the Emerson family only until 1820, and has passed through many hands since then. The square-facing bow windows are a late 19th century alteration. Some of the owners are known to have rented out rooms to tenants.

== See also ==
- National Register of Historic Places listings in Hillsborough County, New Hampshire
