= Milford Cotton and Woolen Manufacturing Company =

- U.S. National Register of Historic Places
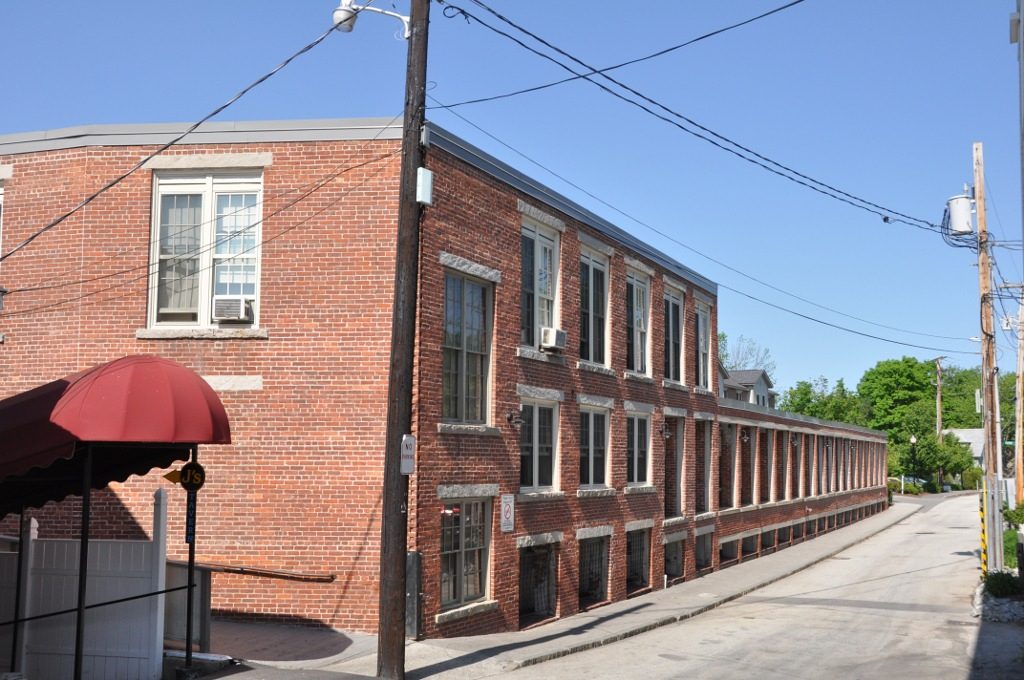

- Location within New Hampshire Location within the United States
- Location: 2 Bridge St., Milford, New Hampshire
- Coordinates: 42°50′11″N 71°38′57″W
- Area: 0.8 acres (0.32 ha)
- Built: 1813
- NRHP reference No.: 82001684
- Added to NRHP: August 18, 1982

The Milford Cotton and Woolen Manufacturing Company is a historic mill complex at 2 Bridge Street in the center of Milford, New Hampshire. Developed between 1813 and World War I, it is one of the few surviving mill complexes in Milford, whose name is derived in part from "mill". The buildings were listed on the National Register of Historic Places in 1982. The complex has been converted into residential use.

== Description and history ==
The Milford Cotton and Woolen Manufacturing Company complex is located just north of the Milford Oval, on the southern bank of the Souhegan River, the historic source of its power. It consists of a single large building which developed in an evolutionary way between 1813, when its oldest part was built, and 1916, when the last major modifications were made. The mill occupies a site on the banks of the Souhegan River, which provided its power. The core of the structure is a three-story wooden building, which was the first part built. This was extended and enlarged in 1860 and 1883, and the brick end sections were added by later additions.

The mill was founded about 1813, producing fabric during the War of 1812. It closed in 1833, and was reopened under new ownership in 1838. At that time, it was enlarged and possibly rebuilt entirely. Its largest period of growth came after its acquisition in 1860 by Morse, Kaley & Company, who built its largest elements. The complex was sold to the American Thread Company in 1901, and sold in 1916. During World War I it produced fabric for lining military uniforms. It is one of the city's few surviving 19th-century industrial complexes.

== See also ==
- Hillsborough Mills
- National Register of Historic Places listings in Hillsborough County, New Hampshire
