= Way House =

Way House may refer to:

- James W. and Mary Way House, Kirkwood, MO, listed on the NRHP in Missouri
- Killicut-Way House, Nashua, NH, listed on the NRHP in New Hampshire
- Dr. J. Howell Way House, Waynesville, NC, listed on the NRHP in North Carolina
- Way House (Wagoner, Oklahoma), listed on the NRHP in Oklahoma
- Nicholas Way House, Pittsburgh, PA, listed on the NRHP in Pennsylvania

== See also ==
- Halfway House (disambiguation)
