= Weston Observatory =

Weston Observatory may refer to a location in the United States:

- Weston Observatory (Boston College), a research institute at Boston College
- Weston Observatory (Manchester, New Hampshire), listed on the National Register of Historic Places
