= Bennington Village Historic District =

Historic district in New Hampshire, United States

- U.S. National Register of Historic Places
- U.S. Historic district
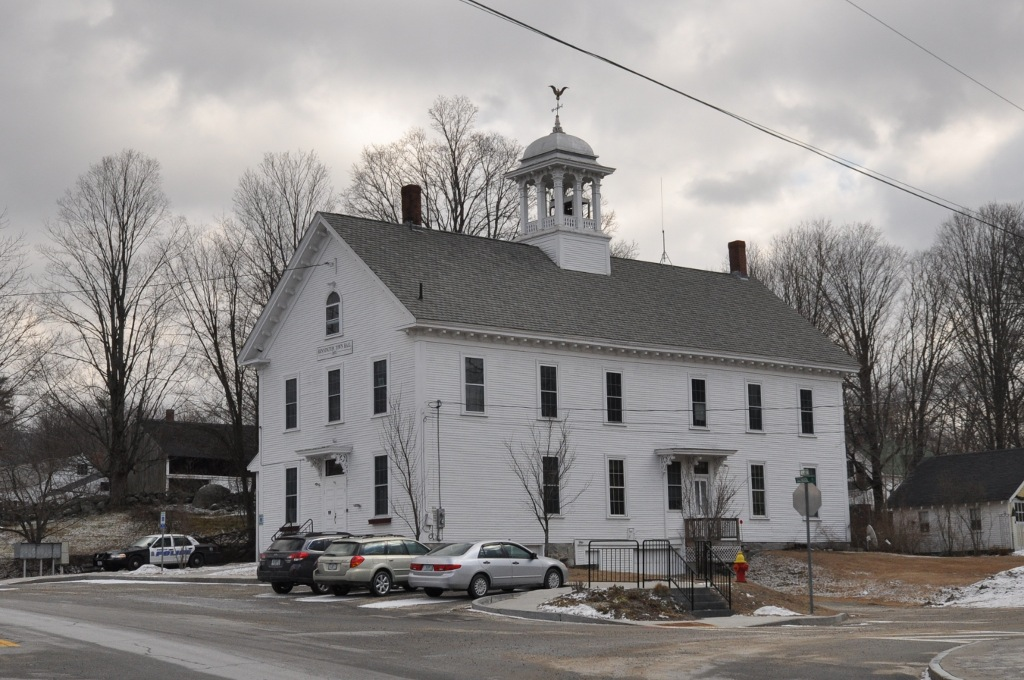
- Bennington Town Hall

- Location within New Hampshire Location within the United States
- Location: Antrim Rd, Main St, School St, Cross St, Grancestown Rd, South Bennington Rd, Acre St, Old Stagecoach Rd, Starrett Rd..., Bennington, New Hampshire
- Coordinates: 43.00199°N 71.92383°W
- Area: 130 acres (53 ha)
- Built: 1842
- Architectural style: Federal, Late Victorian
- NRHP reference No.: 10000185
- Added to NRHP: April 19, 2010

The Bennington Village Historic District of Bennington, New Hampshire encompasses the 19th-century center of the village. Growth of the village followed a typical pattern for rural New Hampshire towns, based in this case around the growth in the early 19th century of the paper industry, which continues to be a significant economic force in the community. The district is centered on the junctions of Main, Center, and School Streets with Bible Hill Road and Francestown Road. The district was listed on the National Register of Historic Places in 2010.

== Description and history ==
The area that is now Bennington Village was settled in the 18th century as part of Hancock, and was originally known as "Hancock Factory". Around 1782, Joseph Putnam established a sawmill and gristmill, and built a bridge across the Contoocook River, the power for his mills and those to come. The village developed as an independent industrial center, and was incorporated as Bennington out of Hancock and portions of other towns in 1842. In those years, additional dams were built on the river, and a cotton mill and a paper mill were established. In the second half of the 19th century, the manufacture of cutlery arose as a significant economic endeavor. By the mid-20th century, papermaking had come to dominate, and now the only major surviving mill building is associated with that industry.

The historic district is located mainly on the east bank of the Contoocook River, extending from a dam south of the bridge northward to the Monadnock Mills paper plant on the northern edge of the village. A central island of buildings is formed by Cross Street, Main Street, and New Hampshire Route 31, from which the village radiates along a number of main roads, which either lead to neighboring towns or parallel the river banks. The village includes all of the town's major civic buildings, including its town hall and library, as well as its first cemetery. Industrial resources include five dams on the river, as well as a power station from the early 20th century, which provided the first streetlights in the region.

== See also ==
- National Register of Historic Places listings in Hillsborough County, New Hampshire
