= G.O. Sanders House =

Historic house in New Hampshire, United States

- G. O. Sanders House
- U.S. National Register of Historic Places
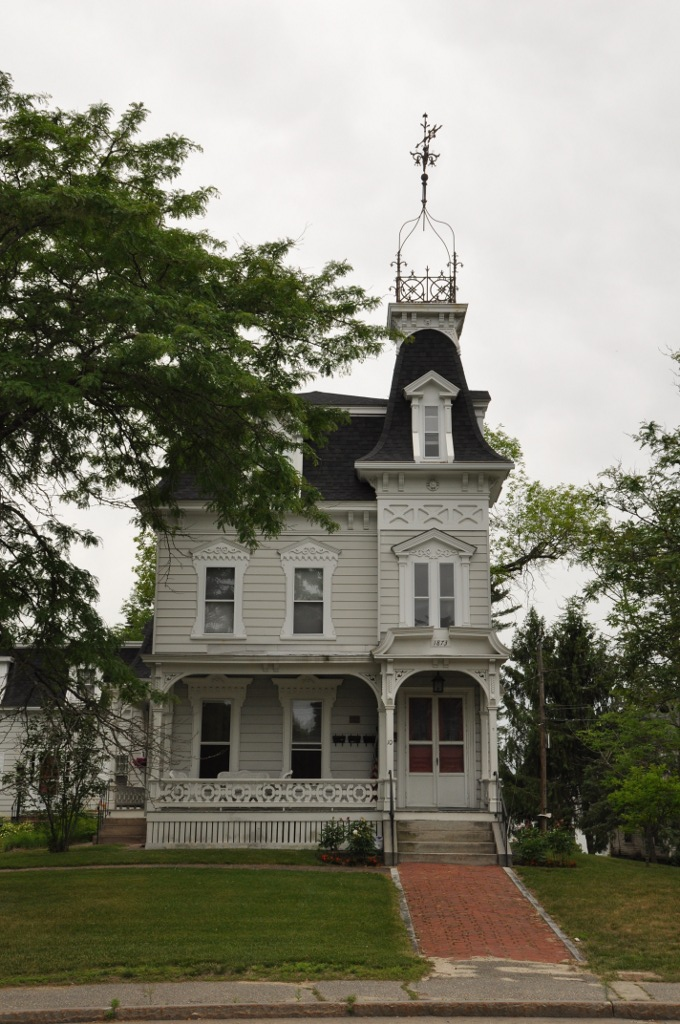

- Location within New Hampshire Location within the United States
- Location: 10 Derry St., Hudson, New Hampshire
- Coordinates: 42°45′57″N 71°26′26″W
- Area: 0.8 acres (0.32 ha)
- Built: 1873
- Architect: Sanders, George O.
- Architectural style: Second Empire
- NRHP reference No.: 86000277
- Added to NRHP: February 27, 1986

The G.O. Sanders House is a historic house at 10 Derry Street (New Hampshire Route 102) in the center of Hudson, New Hampshire. Built in 1873-75 by George Sanders, this 2 1/2-story wood-frame house is a well-preserved example of French Second Empire style. It was listed on the National Register of Historic Places in 1986.

== Description and history ==
The G.O. Sanders House occupies a visible position in the village center of Hudson, facing its town common across Derry Street. It is a 2 1/2-story wood-frame structure, its walls finished in wooden clapboards. It has a mansard roof with flared eaves, and a three-story tower topped with a mansard roof, above which is a platform with Stick style decoration, a wrought-iron railing, and a wrought-iron canopy topped by a spire. The main facade has elaborate window framing elements and a highly decorated porch.

The house was built between 1873 and 1875 by George Sanders when he was relatively young. Sanders, trained in the building trades by his father, went on to have a productive career in Hudson and neighboring Nashua, where he established a box factory. Sanders was also instrumental in bringing public water to Hudson, and was a driving force in the establishment of a street railway. His house was later converted into a multiunit apartment house, and portions of its once more elaborate exterior have been lost. Also lost was an elaborate picket fence that once extended across the front of the property, with styling similar to that of the house.

== See also ==
- National Register of Historic Places listings in Hillsborough County, New Hampshire
