= Hillsborough County Registry of Deeds =

- Hillsborough County Courthouse
- U.S. National Register of Historic Places
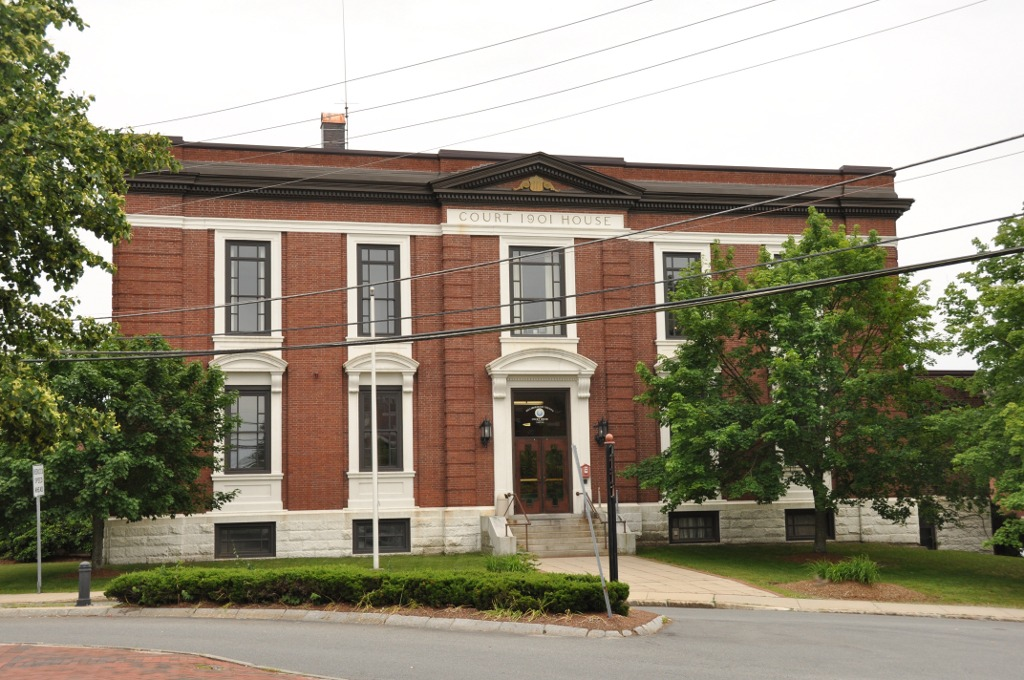

- Location within New Hampshire Location within the United States
- Interactive map showing the location of Hillsborough County Registry of Deeds
- Location: 19 Temple St., Nashua, New Hampshire
- Coordinates: 42°45′41″N 71°27′54″W
- Area: 0.3 acres (0.12 ha)
- Built: 1901
- Architect: Daniel Howard Woodbury
- NRHP reference No.: 85001196
- Added to NRHP: June 6, 1985

The Hillsborough County Registry of Deeds is located at 19 Temple Street in Nashua, one of the county seats of Hillsborough County, New Hampshire. The two-story brick building was built in 1901 as a courthouse and county office building to a design by Boston architect Daniel H. Woodbury, and is a good example of Classical Revival architecture. The building was listed on the National Register of Historic Places in 1985. The current courthouse is a modern building at 30 Spring Street.

== Description and history ==
The Hillsborough County Registry of Deeds is located one block east of Main Street in downtown Nashua, on the south side of Temple Street at its junction with Court Street. It is a two-story brick building. It is trimmed with granite and cast stone, and has rusticated brickwork at its corners, and a cornice decorated with dentil and egg-and-dart moulding. The building exterior is largely unmodified except for the removal (sometime after 1946) of a small dome, and the addition to its rear of a wing housing additional offices.

Construction of a new courthouse in Nashua was authorized in 1901, after significant population growth in the region taxed the existing county's facilities. The county purchased land from Dr. Edward Spalding, and retained Daniel Howard Woodbury of the Boston firm Dean & Woodbury to design the new building. The building was completed in 1903, housing probate facilities and county offices on the ground floor, the main superior court chamber on the upper floor, and vaults and jail cells in the basement. The two-story wing in the rear was added in 1946. At the time of its National Register listing in 1985, it was still in used as a courthouse; that function and other county facilities have been relocated to a new building on Spring Street.

== See also ==
- National Register of Historic Places listings in Hillsborough County, New Hampshire
