= National Register of Historic Places listings in Hillsborough County, New Hampshire =

Location of Hillsborough County in New Hampshire

This is intended to be a complete list of the properties and districts on the National Register of Historic Places in Hillsborough County, New Hampshire, United States. Latitude and longitude coordinates are provided for many National Register properties and districts; these locations may be seen together in a map.

There are 112 properties and districts listed on the National Register in the county, including 2 National Historic Landmarks.

Contents: Counties in New Hampshire
Belknap - Carroll - Cheshire - Coös - Grafton - Hillsborough - Merrimack - Rockingham - Strafford - Sullivan

This National Park Service list is complete through NPS recent listings posted April 24, 2026.

== Current listings ==
| | Name on the Register | Image | Date listed | Location | City or town | Description |
|---|---|---|---|---|---|---|
| 1 | Abbot House | Abbot House | April 17, 1980 (#80000289) | 1 Abbott Sq. 42°45′57″N 71°28′08″W | Nashua | |
| 2 | All Saints' Church | All Saints' Church | December 1, 1980 (#80000290) | 51 Concord St. 42°52′50″N 71°56′48″W | Peterborough | |
| 3 | Amherst Village Historic District | Amherst Village Historic District | August 18, 1982 (#82001679) | NH 101 and NH 122; 42°51′46″N 71°37′37″W | Amherst | |
| 4 | Ash Street School | Ash Street School | May 30, 1975 (#75000232) | Bounded by Ash, Bridge, Maple, and Pearl Sts. 42°59′46″N 71°27′17″W | Manchester | |
| 5 | Athens Building | Athens Building | May 30, 1975 (#75000123) | 76–96 Hanover St. 42°59′29″N 71°27′43″W | Manchester | |
| 6 | Jonathan Barnes House | Jonathan Barnes House | March 1, 1982 (#82001680) | North Rd. 43°08′51″N 71°56′02″W | Hillsborough Center | |
| 7 | Bedford Presbyterian Church | Bedford Presbyterian Church | June 12, 2007 (#07000554) | 4 Church Rd. 42°56′42″N 71°31′12″W | Bedford | |
| 8 | Bedford Town Hall | Bedford Town Hall | December 13, 1984 (#84000530) | 70 Bedford Center Rd. 42°56′47″N 71°30′57″W | Bedford | |
| 9 | Bennington Village Historic District | Bennington Village Historic District | April 19, 2010 (#10000185) | Antrim Rd, Main St, School St, Cross St, Francestown Rd, South Bennington Rd, Acre St, Old Stagecoach Rd, Starrett Rd. 43°00′11″N 71°55′28″W | Bennington | |
| 10 | Birchwood Inn | Birchwood Inn | June 6, 1985 (#85001194) | NH 45; 42°49′12″N 71°51′04″W | Temple | |
| 11 | Brick Schoolhouse | Brick Schoolhouse | September 14, 2002 (#02000957) | 432 NH 123; 42°48′52″N 71°55′00″W | Sharon | |
| 12 | Building at 418–420 Notre Dame Ave. | Building at 418–420 Notre Dame Ave. | December 20, 1996 (#96001467) | 418–420 Notre Dame Ave. 42°59′35″N 71°28′34″W | Manchester | Houses the America's Credit Union Museum, site of the first credit union |
| 13 | Carpenter and Bean Block | Carpenter and Bean Block | December 13, 2002 (#02001548) | 1382–1414 Elm St. 42°59′52″N 71°27′53″W | Manchester | |
| 14 | Frank Pierce Carpenter House | Frank Pierce Carpenter House | March 17, 1994 (#94000168) | 1800 Elm St. 43°00′17″N 71°27′57″W | Manchester | |
| 15 | Amos Chase House and Mill | Amos Chase House and Mill | March 12, 1992 (#92000155) | Western side of NH 114, 1/8 mile south of its junction with NH 77; 43°06′32″N 71°45′01″W | Weare | |
| 16 | Citizens' Hall | Citizens' Hall | December 9, 1999 (#99001482) | 13–12 Citizens' Hall Rd. 42°52′44″N 71°47′05″W | Lyndeborough | |
| 17 | Contoocook Mills Industrial District | Contoocook Mills Industrial District | June 10, 1975 (#75000124) | Between Mill St. and the Contoocook River; also Mill St. 43°06′48″N 71°53′40″W | Hillsborough | Mill St. represents a boundary increase. |
| 18 | County Farm Bridge | County Farm Bridge | May 14, 1981 (#81000070) | Northwest of Wilton on Old County Farm Rd. 42°51′25″N 71°49′03″W | Wilton | |
| 19 | Daniel Cragin Mill | Daniel Cragin Mill | March 23, 1982 (#82001681) | West of Wilton at the junction of Davisville Rd. and the Burton Highway; 42°51′22″N 71°47′20″W | Wilton | Also known as Frye's Measure Mill |
| 20 | Currier Gallery of Art | Currier Gallery of Art | December 19, 1979 (#79000199) | 192 Orange St. 42°59′52″N 71°27′21″W | Manchester | |
| 21 | District A | District A | November 12, 1982 (#82000618) | Bounded by Pleasant, State, Granite, and Bedford Sts. 42°59′14″N 71°28′05″W | Manchester | Worker housing district located near the Amoskeag Millyard |
| 22 | District B | District B | November 12, 1982 (#82000619) | Roughly bounded by Canal, Mechanic, Franklin, and Pleasant Sts. 42°59′25″N 71°27′57″W | Manchester | Worker housing district located near the Amoskeag Millyard |
| 23 | District C | District C | November 12, 1982 (#82000620) | Roughly bounded by N. Hampshire Lane, Hollis, Canal, and Bridge Sts. 42°59′43″N 71°27′55″W | Manchester | Worker housing district located near the Amoskeag Millyard |
| 24 | District D | District D | November 12, 1982 (#82000621) | Roughly bounded by Canal, Langdon, Elm, and W. Brook Sts. 42°59′57″N 71°27′59″W | Manchester | Worker housing district located near the Amoskeag Millyard |
| 25 | District E | District E | November 12, 1982 (#82000622) | 258–322 McGregor St. 42°59′40″N 71°28′27″W | Manchester | Worker housing district located near the Amoskeag Millyard |
| 26 | Dunlap Building | Dunlap Building | June 9, 2004 (#04000587) | 967 Elm St. 42°59′30″N 71°27′48″W | Manchester | |
| 27 | First Unitarian Congregational Church | | January 12, 2026 (#100012532) | 586 Isaac Frye Highway; 42°49′54″N 71°46′35″W | Wilton | |
| 28 | The Flint Estate | The Flint Estate | December 13, 1984 (#84000525) | Old Keene and Old Center Rd. 43°05′04″N 71°58′40″W | Antrim | |
| 29 | Francestown Meetinghouse | Francestown Meetinghouse | June 14, 1999 (#99000667) | NH 136; 42°59′14″N 71°48′46″W | Francestown | |
| 30 | Francestown Town Hall and Academy and Town Common Historic District | Francestown Town Hall and Academy and Town Common Historic District | April 5, 2016 (#16000143) | 2 New Boston Rd. 42°59′13″N 71°48′44″W | Francestown | |
| 31 | Alpheus Gay House | Alpheus Gay House | March 9, 1982 (#82001682) | 184 Myrtle St. 42°59′53″N 71°27′25″W | Manchester | |
| 32 | Goffstown Congregational Church | Goffstown Congregational Church | March 1, 1996 (#96000193) | 10 Main St. 43°01′10″N 71°36′03″W | Goffstown | |
| 33 | Goffstown Covered Railroad Bridge | Goffstown Covered Railroad Bridge | June 18, 1975 (#75000125) | NH 114 (Main St.) over the Piscataquog River; 43°01′04″N 71°35′58″W | Goffstown | Destroyed by fire on August 16, 1976 (Bridge abutments are visible in the photo.) |
| 34 | Goffstown High School | Goffstown High School | December 19, 1997 (#97001524) | 12 Reed St. 43°01′10″N 71°35′54″W | Goffstown | Former high school building is now senior housing. |
| 35 | Goffstown Main Street Historic District | Goffstown Main Street Historic District | March 15, 2007 (#07000153) | Selected buildings on Church St., Depot St., High St., Main St., and N. Mast St. 43°01′09″N 71°36′00″W | Goffstown | |
| 36 | Goffstown Public Library | Goffstown Public Library | December 7, 1995 (#95001426) | 2 High St. 43°01′14″N 71°36′01″W | Goffstown | |
| 37 | Goodell Company Mill | | January 6, 2023 (#100008525) | 42 Main St. 43°01′39″N 71°56′16″W | Antrim | |
| 38 | Grasmere Schoolhouse #9 and Town Hall | Grasmere Schoolhouse #9 and Town Hall | September 5, 1990 (#90001350) | 87 Center St. 43°01′18″N 71°32′46″W | Goffstown | In village of Grasmere |
| 39 | Greenfield Meeting House | Greenfield Meeting House | December 8, 1983 (#83004090) | Forest Rd. 42°57′03″N 71°52′21″W | Greenfield | |
| 40 | Hamblet-Putnam-Frye House | Hamblet-Putnam-Frye House | June 22, 2000 (#00000651) | 293 Burton Highway; 42°51′23″N 71°47′28″W | Wilton | |
| 41 | Hancock Village Historic District | Hancock Village Historic District | March 8, 1988 (#88000178) | Main St. roughly between Norway Pond La. and Old Dublin Rd., and Bennington and Norway Hill Rds. 42°58′22″N 71°58′59″W | Hancock | |
| 42 | Hancock–Greenfield Bridge | Hancock–Greenfield Bridge | May 5, 1981 (#81000071) | Forest Rd. 42°57′25″N 71°56′08″W | Hancock | Over Contoocook River |
| 43 | Harrington-Smith Block | Harrington-Smith Block | January 28, 1987 (#86003367) | 18–52 Hanover St. 42°59′28″N 71°27′44″W | Manchester | |
| 44 | Hill–Lassonde House | Hill–Lassonde House | December 2, 1985 (#85003033) | 269 Hanover St. 42°59′27″N 71°27′21″W | Manchester | Demolished in 2016. |
| 45 | Hills House | Hills House | April 8, 1983 (#83001141) | 211 Derry Rd. 42°47′46″N 71°26′05″W | Hudson | Architect Hubert G. Ripley |
| 46 | Hills Memorial Library | Hills Memorial Library | June 7, 1984 (#84002812) | 16 Library St. 42°45′54″N 71°26′19″W | Hudson | |
| 47 | Hillsborough County Courthouse | Hillsborough County Courthouse | June 6, 1985 (#85001196) | 19 Temple St. 42°45′41″N 71°27′54″W | Nashua | |
| 48 | Hillsborough Mills | Hillsborough Mills | June 14, 2013 (#13000383) | 37 Wilton Rd. 42°50′28″N 71°43′18″W | Milford | |
| 49 | Hillsborough Railroad Bridge | Hillsborough Railroad Bridge | June 10, 1975 (#75000126) | Spans the Contoocook River southwest of NH 149; 43°06′48″N 71°53′44″W | Hillsborough | Destroyed by arson in 1985. (Image is from a 1907 postcard.) |
| 50 | Hollis Village Historic District | Hollis Village Historic District | March 2, 2001 (#01000204) | Roughly parts of Ash St., Broad St., Cleasby Ln., Depot Rd., Main St., Monument Sq. and Silver Lake Rd. 42°44′17″N 71°35′05″W | Hollis | |
| 51 | Hoyt Shoe Factory | Hoyt Shoe Factory | November 7, 1985 (#85002777) | 477 Silver and 170 Lincoln Sts. 42°58′38″N 71°27′05″W | Manchester | |
| 52 | Thomas Russell Hubbard House | Thomas Russell Hubbard House | March 8, 1988 (#88000177) | 220 Myrtle St. 42°59′54″N 71°27′17″W | Manchester | |
| 53 | Hunt Memorial Library | Hunt Memorial Library | June 28, 1971 (#71000049) | 6 Main St. 42°45′55″N 71°28′03″W | Nashua | |
| 54 | Kalil House | Kalil House | September 22, 2025 (#100012252) | 117 Heather Street; 43°01′18″N 71°27′55″W | Manchester | |
| 55 | Kennedy Hill Farm | Kennedy Hill Farm | June 7, 1984 (#84002813) | Kennedy Hill Rd. 42°59′47″N 71°32′21″W | Goffstown | |
| 56 | Killicut-Way House | Killicut-Way House | December 1, 1989 (#89002056) | 2 Old House Ln. 42°43′55″N 71°28′15″W | Nashua | |
| 57 | Kimball Brothers Shoe Factory | Kimball Brothers Shoe Factory | November 7, 1985 (#85002776) | 335 Cypress St. 42°58′55″N 71°26′22″W | Manchester | |
| 58 | Lamson Farm | Lamson Farm | February 24, 1981 (#81000072) | Lamson Rd. 42°55′17″N 71°41′07″W | Mont Vernon | |
| 59 | Lyndeborough Center Historic District | Lyndeborough Center Historic District | June 7, 1984 (#84002814) | Center Rd. 42°54′24″N 71°46′02″W | Lyndeborough Center | |
| 60 | MacDowell Colony | MacDowell Colony | October 15, 1966 (#66000026) | West of U.S. Route 202; 42°53′27″N 71°57′39″W | Peterborough | An artists' colony |
| 61 | Manchester City Hall | Manchester City Hall | June 13, 1975 (#75000233) | 908 Elm St. 42°59′28″N 71°27′50″W | Manchester | |
| 62 | McClure-Hilton House | McClure-Hilton House | December 1, 1989 (#89002058) | 16 Tinker Rd. 42°48′40″N 71°31′45″W | Merrimack | |
| 63 | The Meetinghouse | The Meetinghouse | March 11, 1982 (#82001683) | Monument Sq. 42°44′22″N 71°35′18″W | Hollis | |
| 64 | Milford Cotton and Woolen Manufacturing Company | Milford Cotton and Woolen Manufacturing Company | August 18, 1982 (#82001684) | 2 Bridge St. 42°50′11″N 71°38′57″W | Milford | |
| 65 | Milford Suspension Bridge | Milford Suspension Bridge | July 17, 2017 (#100001321) | E. of eastern end of Bridge St. 42°50′12″N 71°38′44″W | Milford | |
| 66 | Milford Town House and Library Annex | Milford Town House and Library Annex | December 1, 1988 (#88001436) | Nashua St. 42°50′08″N 71°38′58″W | Milford | |
| 67 | Mont Vernon Town Hall | Mont Vernon Town Hall | May 14, 2024 (#100010318) | 1 South Main Street; 42°53′34″N 71°40′26″W | Mont Vernon | |
| 68 | Nashua Gummed and Coated Paper Company Historic District | Nashua Gummed and Coated Paper Company Historic District | December 22, 2015 (#15000919) | 34, 44, 55 Franklin & 21, 25 30 Front Sts. 42°45′46″N 71°28′13″W | Nashua | |
| 69 | Nashua Manufacturing Company Historic District | Nashua Manufacturing Company Historic District | September 11, 1987 (#87001460) | Factory and Pine Sts. 42°45′35″N 71°28′22″W | Nashua | |
| 70 | Nashville Historic District | Nashville Historic District | December 13, 1984 (#84000574) | Roughly centered on junction of Main, Amherst, and Concord Streets; 42°46′08″N 71°27′59″W | Nashua | |
| 71 | New England Glassworks Site | New England Glassworks Site | June 10, 1975 (#75000127) | near Kidder Mountain | Temple | Site of a 1780s glassworks, one of the first in the nation |
| 72 | New Hampshire State Union Armory | New Hampshire State Union Armory | August 10, 1982 (#82004993) | 60 Pleasant St. 42°59′18″N 71°27′57″W | Manchester | |
| 73 | New Ipswich Center Village Historic District | New Ipswich Center Village Historic District | September 3, 1991 (#91001173) | Roughly bounded by Turnpike Rd., Porter Hill Rd., Main St., NH 123A, Preston Hill, Manley, and King Rds. 42°45′10″N 71°51′22″W | New Ipswich | |
| 74 | New Ipswich Town Hall | New Ipswich Town Hall | December 13, 1984 (#84000555) | Main St. 42°44′53″N 71°51′17″W | New Ipswich | |
| 75 | Marion Nichols Summer Home | Marion Nichols Summer Home | December 10, 2003 (#03001283) | 56 Love Lane; 42°44′04″N 71°36′02″W | Hollis | Now known as the Beaver Brook Association's Lodge |
| 76 | North Weare Schoolhouse | North Weare Schoolhouse | September 6, 1995 (#95001051) | Northern side of Old Concord Stage Rd. east of its junction with NH 114; 43°06′40″N 71°44′56″W | Weare | |
| 77 | Old County Road South Historic District | Old County Road South Historic District | May 15, 1980 (#80000413) | South of Francestown off NH 136; 42°58′27″N 71°48′22″W | Francestown | |
| 78 | Old Post Office Block | Old Post Office Block | December 1, 1986 (#86003364) | 54–72 Hanover St. 42°59′28″N 71°27′44″W | Manchester | |
| 79 | Parker's Store | Parker's Store | May 14, 1980 (#80000414) | West of Goffstown on NH 114; 43°01′34″N 71°37′42″W | Goffstown | |
| 80 | William Peabody House | William Peabody House | November 30, 1979 (#79000200) | N. River Rd. 42°50′38″N 71°39′56″W | Milford | |
| 81 | Pelham Library and Memorial Building | Pelham Library and Memorial Building | April 15, 2011 (#11000191) | 5 Main St. 42°44′02″N 71°19′19″W | Pelham | |
| 82 | Peterborough Town House | Peterborough Town House | February 29, 1996 (#96000194) | 1 Grove St. 42°52′38″N 71°57′04″W | Peterborough | |
| 83 | Peterborough Unitarian Church | Peterborough Unitarian Church | April 23, 1973 (#73000165) | Main and Summer Sts. 42°52′40″N 71°57′00″W | Peterborough | |
| 84 | Franklin Pierce Homestead | Franklin Pierce Homestead | October 15, 1966 (#66000027) | 3 mi (4.8 km) west of Hillsborough on NH 31; 43°06′58″N 71°57′03″W | Hillsborough | Childhood home of U.S. President Franklin Pierce |
| 85 | St. George's School and Convent | St. George's School and Convent | September 12, 1985 (#85002192) | 124 Orange St. 42°59′49″N 71°27′36″W | Manchester | |
| 86 | Sainte Marie Roman Catholic Church Parish Historic District | Sainte Marie Roman Catholic Church Parish Historic District | September 13, 2019 (#100004416) | 378 Notre Dame Ave, 133 Wayne St., 279 & 284 Cartier St. 42°59′32″N 71°28′33″W | Manchester | |
| 87 | G.O. Sanders House | G.O. Sanders House | February 27, 1986 (#86000277) | 10 Derry St. 42°45′57″N 71°26′26″W | Hudson | |
| 88 | Signer's House and Matthew Thornton Cemetery | Signer's House and Matthew Thornton Cemetery | December 22, 1978 (#78000214) | South of Merrimack on U.S. Route 3; 42°50′23″N 71°29′30″W | Merrimack | |
| 89 | Smith and Dow Block | Smith and Dow Block | December 13, 2002 (#02001549) | 1426–1470 Elm St. 42°59′54″N 71°27′54″W | Manchester | |
| 90 | Gov. John Butler Smith House | Gov. John Butler Smith House | September 14, 2002 (#02000959) | 62 School St. 43°06′59″N 71°53′47″W | Hillsborough | Houses the local library and town offices |
| 91 | Smyth Tower | Smyth Tower | July 24, 1978 (#78000215) | 718 Smyth Rd. 43°00′44″N 71°26′31″W | Manchester | On the grounds of the Manchester VA Hospital |
| 92 | Stark Park | Stark Park | June 14, 2006 (#06000505) | Bounded by N. River Rd., Park Ave., and the Merrimack River; 43°00′52″N 71°28′17″W | Manchester | |
| 93 | Gen. George Stark House | Gen. George Stark House | November 25, 1980 (#80000291) | 22 Concord St. 42°46′05″N 71°28′04″W | Nashua | |
| 94 | Gen. John Stark House | Gen. John Stark House | June 29, 1973 (#73000166) | 2000 Elm St. 43°00′30″N 71°28′00″W | Manchester | |
| 95 | Stonyfield Farm | Stonyfield Farm | August 3, 1983 (#83001142) | Northwest of Wilton on Foster Rd. 42°52′00″N 71°47′24″W | Wilton | Farm (dating to the 19th century) where yogurt-maker Stonyfield Farm was founded |
| 96 | William Parker Straw House | William Parker Straw House | December 8, 1987 (#87002068) | 282 N. River Rd. 43°00′26″N 71°28′09″W | Manchester | |
| 97 | Sullivan House | | July 6, 2023 (#100009112) | 1330 Union St. 43°01′16″N 71°27′45″W | Manchester | |
| 98 | Roger Sullivan House | Roger Sullivan House | March 10, 2004 (#04000150) | 168 Walnut St. 42°59′54″N 71°27′30″W | Manchester | |
| 99 | Temple Town Hall | Temple Town Hall | June 12, 2007 (#07000551) | Main St., junction of NH 45 and the Gen. Miller Highway; 42°49′12″N 71°51′08″W | Temple | |
| 100 | Union Chapel | Union Chapel | February 3, 2009 (#08001411) | 220 Sawmill Rd. 43°06′46″N 71°56′37″W | Hillsborough | |
| 101 | US Post Office-Peterborough Main | US Post Office-Peterborough Main | July 17, 1986 (#86002253) | 23 Grove St. 42°52′36″N 71°57′04″W | Peterborough | |
| 102 | Valley Cemetery | Valley Cemetery | September 10, 2004 (#04000964) | Pine and Auburn Sts. 42°58′59″N 71°27′40″W | Manchester | |
| 103 | Varney School | Varney School | January 11, 1982 (#82001685) | 84 Varney St. 42°58′49″N 71°28′43″W | Manchester | |
| 104 | Victory Park Historic District | Victory Park Historic District | June 3, 1996 (#96000615) | 405 Pine, 148 Concord, and 111 and 129 Amherst Sts. 42°59′32″N 71°27′37″W | Manchester | |
| 105 | Weare Town House | Weare Town House | December 2, 1985 (#85003034) | NH 114; 43°05′45″N 71°43′51″W | Weare | |
| 106 | Weston Observatory | Weston Observatory | May 28, 1975 (#75000128) | Oak Hill, Derryfield Park; 43°00′04″N 71°26′21″W | Manchester | |
| 107 | Oliver Whiting Homestead | Oliver Whiting Homestead | March 9, 1982 (#82001686) | Old County Farm Rd. 42°51′18″N 71°49′21″W | Wilton | |
| 108 | Caleb Whittaker Place | Caleb Whittaker Place | August 3, 1983 (#83001143) | Perkins Pond Rd. 43°02′46″N 71°44′29″W | Weare | |
| 109 | Wilton Public and Gregg Free Library | Wilton Public and Gregg Free Library | January 11, 1982 (#82001687) | Forest St. 42°50′43″N 71°44′20″W | Wilton | |
| 110 | Wilton Town Hall | Wilton Town Hall | April 20, 2009 (#09000254) | 42 Main St. 42°50′37″N 71°44′15″W | Wilton | |
| 111 | Levi Woodbury Homestead | Levi Woodbury Homestead | March 15, 2007 (#07000152) | 1 Main St. 42°59′14″N 71°48′48″W | Francestown | |
| 112 | Zimmerman House | Zimmerman House | October 18, 1979 (#79003790) | 223 Heather St. 43°01′18″N 71°27′47″W | Manchester | House designed by Frank Lloyd Wright; tours operated by the Currier Museum of Art. |

== Former listing ==
| | Name on the Register | Image | Date listed | Date removed | Location | City or town | Description |
|---|---|---|---|---|---|---|---|
| 1 | T. L. Thorpe Building | T. L. Thorpe Building | August 10, 1982 (#82004896) | April 7, 1983 | 19 Traction St. 42°59′13″N 71°27′50″W | Manchester | Demolished in 1982 as part of Granite Street redevelopment project. |

== See also ==
- List of National Historic Landmarks in New Hampshire
- National Register of Historic Places listings in New Hampshire
