= Gen. George Stark House =

Historic house in New Hampshire, United States

- U.S. National Register of Historic Places
- U.S. Historic district – Contributing property
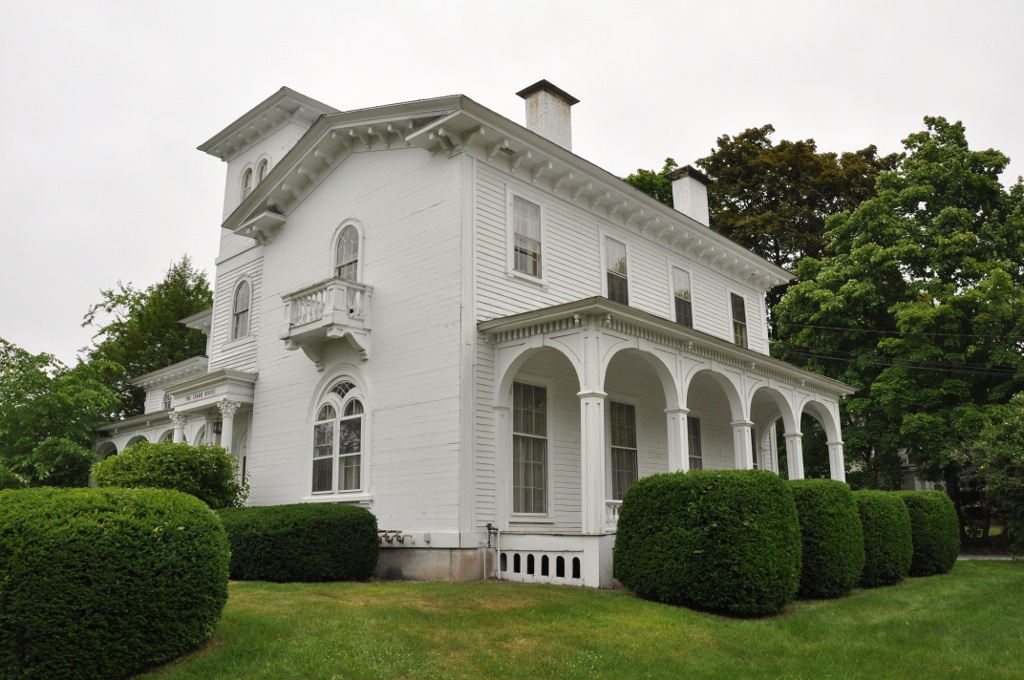

- Location within New Hampshire Location within the United States
- Location: 22 Concord St., Nashua, New Hampshire
- Coordinates: 42°46′5″N 71°28′4″W
- Area: 0.7 acres (0.28 ha)
- Built: 1856
- Architectural style: Italian Villa
- Part of: Nashville Historic District (ID84000574)
- NRHP reference No.: 80000291

Significant dates
- Added to NRHP: November 25, 1980
- Designated CP: December 13, 1984

The Gen. George Stark House is a historic house at 22 Concord Street in Nashua, New Hampshire. Built in 1856, is one New Hampshire's finest Italianate houses. The house was listed on the National Register of Historic Places in 1980, and included in the Nashville Historic District in 1984.

== Description and history ==
The General George Stark House is located north of downtown Nashua, on the west side of Concord Street, just north of a triangular grassy area formed by its junction with Manchester Street. It is a 2 1/2-story wood-frame structure, covered by a low-pitch gabled and hipped roof with elongated eaves supported by brackets. It has an irregular plan, with a three-story square tower rising over its entrance, which is set in an arched opening. The main block is finished in flushboarding, while an ell extending west behind the tower is clapboarded. A single-story hip-roofed porch extends across its street-facing eastern facade, with arched openings and a dentillated and bracketed cornice.

The house was built by George Stark, a Manchester native and civil engineer who worked on railroad projects across northern New England. He became superintendent of the Nashua and Lowell Railroad in 1857. Design inspiration for the house came from Andrew Jackson Downing's works. The house was used for many years of the 20th century by the local congregation of the Church of Christ, Scientist. Despite this conversion of use, the interior retains many original finishes, including builtin bookcases with glazed doors.

== See also ==
- National Register of Historic Places listings in Hillsborough County, New Hampshire
