= McClure-Hilton House =

Historic house in New Hampshire, United States

- U.S. National Register of Historic Places
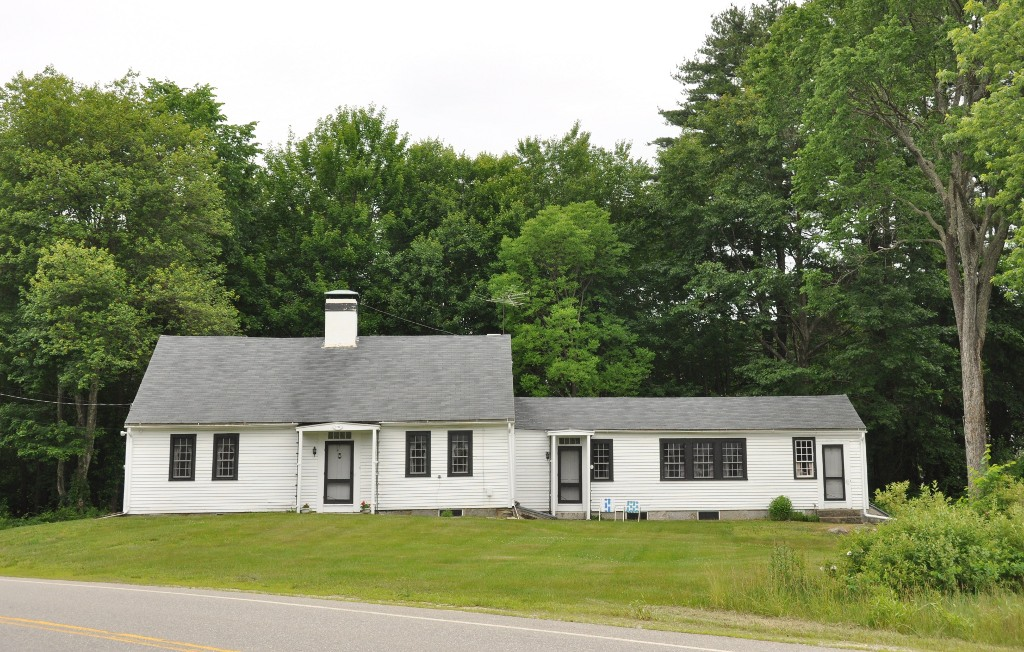

- Location within New Hampshire Location within the United States
- Location: 16 Tinker Rd., Merrimack, New Hampshire
- Coordinates: 42°48′40″N 71°31′45″W
- Area: 1.8 acres (0.73 ha)
- Built: 1741
- NRHP reference No.: 89002058
- Added to NRHP: December 1, 1989

The McClure-Hilton House is a historic house at 16 Tinker Road in Merrimack, New Hampshire. The oldest portion of this 1 1/2-story Cape style house was built c. 1741, and is one of the oldest surviving houses in the area. It was owned by the same family for over 200 years, and its interior includes stencilwork that may have been made by Moses Eaton Jr., an itinerant artist of the 19th century. The property also includes a barn, located on the other side of Tinker Road, which is of great antiquity. The property was listed on the National Register of Historic Places in 1989.

== Description and history ==
The McClure-Hilton House is located in a rural-suburban setting in southern Merrimack, on 1.8 acres (0.73 ha) bisected by Tinker Road south of Camp Sargent Road. The property includes the main house, located on the east side of the road, and a barn, set on the west side of the road. The house is a 1 1/2-story wood-frame structure, with a gabled roof, central chimney, and clapboarded exterior. A gabled ell extends to the right. The main facade is five bays wide, with slightly asymmetrical placement of paired sash windows on either side of a nearly-centered entrance. The entrance is topped by a four-light transom window, and sheltered by a portico with a low-pitch gable roof. The interior follows a central chimney plan, with a narrow entrance vestibule, parlor and hall chambers on either side of the chimney, and a long kitchen in the back, with small chambers in the rear corners. The front rooms have original plaster above broad horizontal wainscoting; the hall on the left is notable for the stencilwork applied to the plaster. The parlor is plainer, but retains an original builtin cabinet.

The exact construction date of the house is unknown. According to family lore, it was built in 1722, but this is at odds with town history, which places all settlement after the town's early proprietors made a land division in 1733, and William McClure's first land purchase in 1741. Stylistic evidence suggests the house was built about 1740. The house remained in the hands of McClure's descendants until 1942. The stencilwork in the hall is believed to have been executed by either Moses Eaton Sr. or Moses Eaton Jr., regionally prominent artists active from the late 18th to late 19th centuries.

== See also ==
- National Register of Historic Places listings in Hillsborough County, New Hampshire
