= Kennedy Hill Farm =

Historic house in New Hampshire, United States

- U.S. National Register of Historic Places
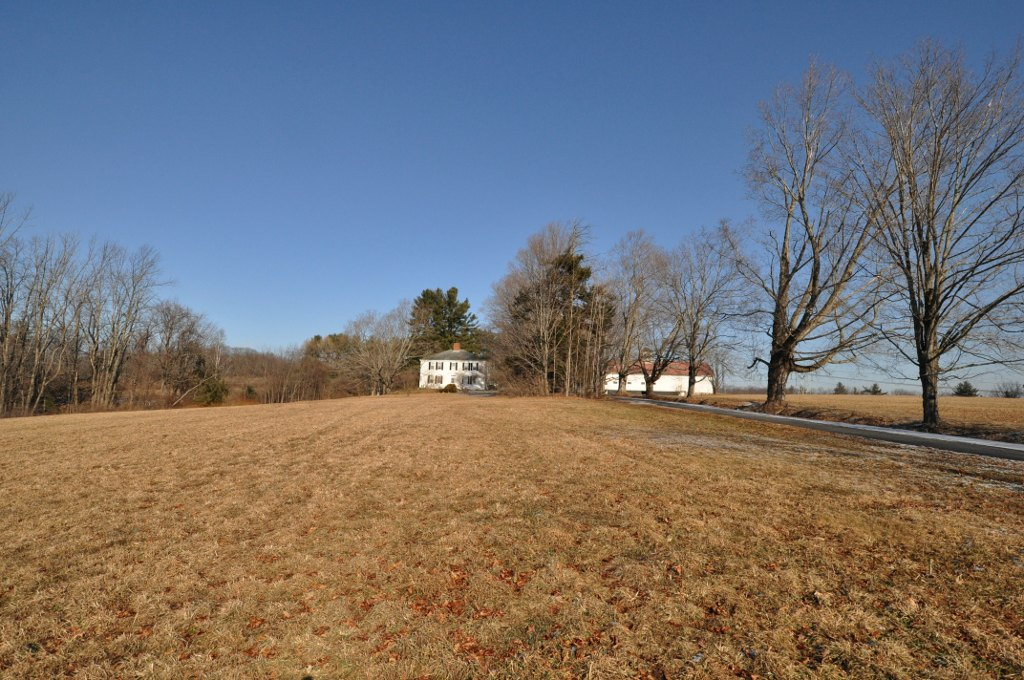

- Location within New Hampshire Location within the United States
- Location: Kennedy Hill Rd., Goffstown, New Hampshire
- Coordinates: 42°59′47″N 71°31′39″W
- Area: 9 acres (3.6 ha)
- Built: 1800
- Built by: Kennedy, Thomas
- NRHP reference No.: 84002813
- Added to NRHP: June 7, 1984

The Kennedy Hill Farm is a historic farmstead on Kennedy Hill Road in Goffstown, New Hampshire. The property exhibits 150 years of agricultural history, with a well-crafted c. 1800 farmhouse built using regionally distinctive joinery skills. The property was listed on the National Register of Historic Places in 1984.

== Description and history ==
The Kennedy Hill Farm is located in a rural setting in eastern Goffstown, on both sides of Kennedy Hill Road north of Addison Road. The property, now 9 acres (3.6 ha) in size, includes the main house, a barn, and a 19th-century shed. Most of the land is open fields; Kennedy Hill Road is lined by a row of mature maples. The main house, located on the west side of the road, is a two-story wood-frame structure, with a hip roof, central chimney, and clapboarded exterior. The interior follows a central chimney plan, with parlors on either side. These rooms are richly decorated in Federal period wood carving that is stylistically distinctive to the region, with especially fine fireplace surrounds and window molding. The barn is located across the street.

The main house was built c. 1800 by Thomas Kennedy, a joiner. Kennedy was a well-known and successful builder in the area, who was responsible for the construction of several area public buildings, including churches and town halls. The interior of this Federal-style house retains many examples of his craft, which is rooted in a melding of traditions from New England's early settlers and those of Scottish Presbyterians who settled Londonderry early in the 18th century.

== See also ==
- National Register of Historic Places listings in Hillsborough County, New Hampshire
