= Hill–Lassonde House =

Historic house in New Hampshire, United States

- U.S. National Register of Historic Places
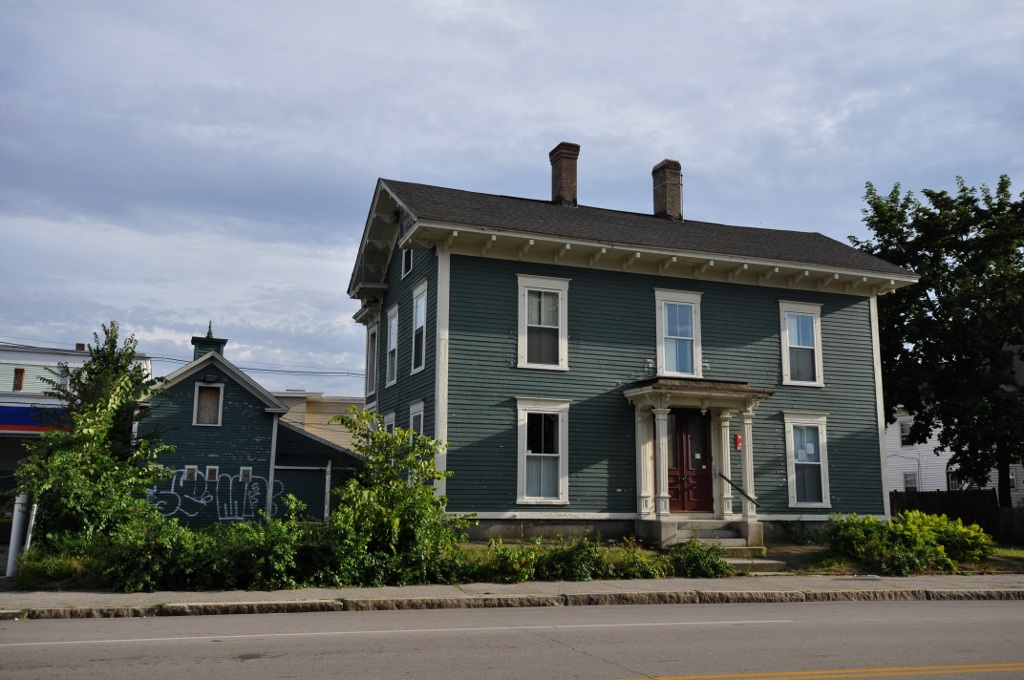
- The house in 2012

- Location within New Hampshire Location within the United States
- Location: 269 Hanover St., Manchester, New Hampshire
- Coordinates: 42°59′27″N 71°27′21″W
- Area: 0.2 acres (0.081 ha)
- Built: 1850
- Architectural style: Italianate, Vernacular Italianate
- NRHP reference No.: 85003033
- Added to NRHP: December 2, 1985

The Hill–Lassonde House was a historic house at 269 Hanover Street in Manchester, New Hampshire, United States. Built in 1850, it was a well-preserved example of Italianate styling. The house was listed on the National Register of Historic Places in 1985, at which time it was still owned by Hill's descendants. The house and carriage house were demolished in July 2016.

== Description and history ==
The Hill–Lassonde House was located east of downtown Manchester, on the south side of Hanover Street opposite Bronstein Park. It was a 2 1/2-story wood-frame structure, with a side-gable roof and Italianate styling. The roof eave was deep and studded with brackets. The main facade was three bays wide, with a center entrance sheltered by a portico supported by fluted square columns and pilasters, with brackets also found in its roof eave. A series of ells extended to the rear, and the property included a period carriage house with cupola. The interior had high-quality period woodwork, with some alterations dating to the early 20th century.

The house was built in 1850 for Alpheus Dwight Burgess, a machinist, on land he had purchased in 1847. The house was typical of houses built during this period, which was a boom time in the city, producing a large number of houses of this type. Burgess sold the house in 1855 to Varnum Hill, in whose family it remained at least into the 1980s. Ownership by a single family contributed to its state of preservation relative to similar houses nearby, which were often demolished or extensively altered. This house was demolished in 2016.

== See also ==
- National Register of Historic Places listings in Hillsborough County, New Hampshire
