= City Hall (Manchester, New Hampshire) =

- Manchester City Hall
- U.S. National Register of Historic Places
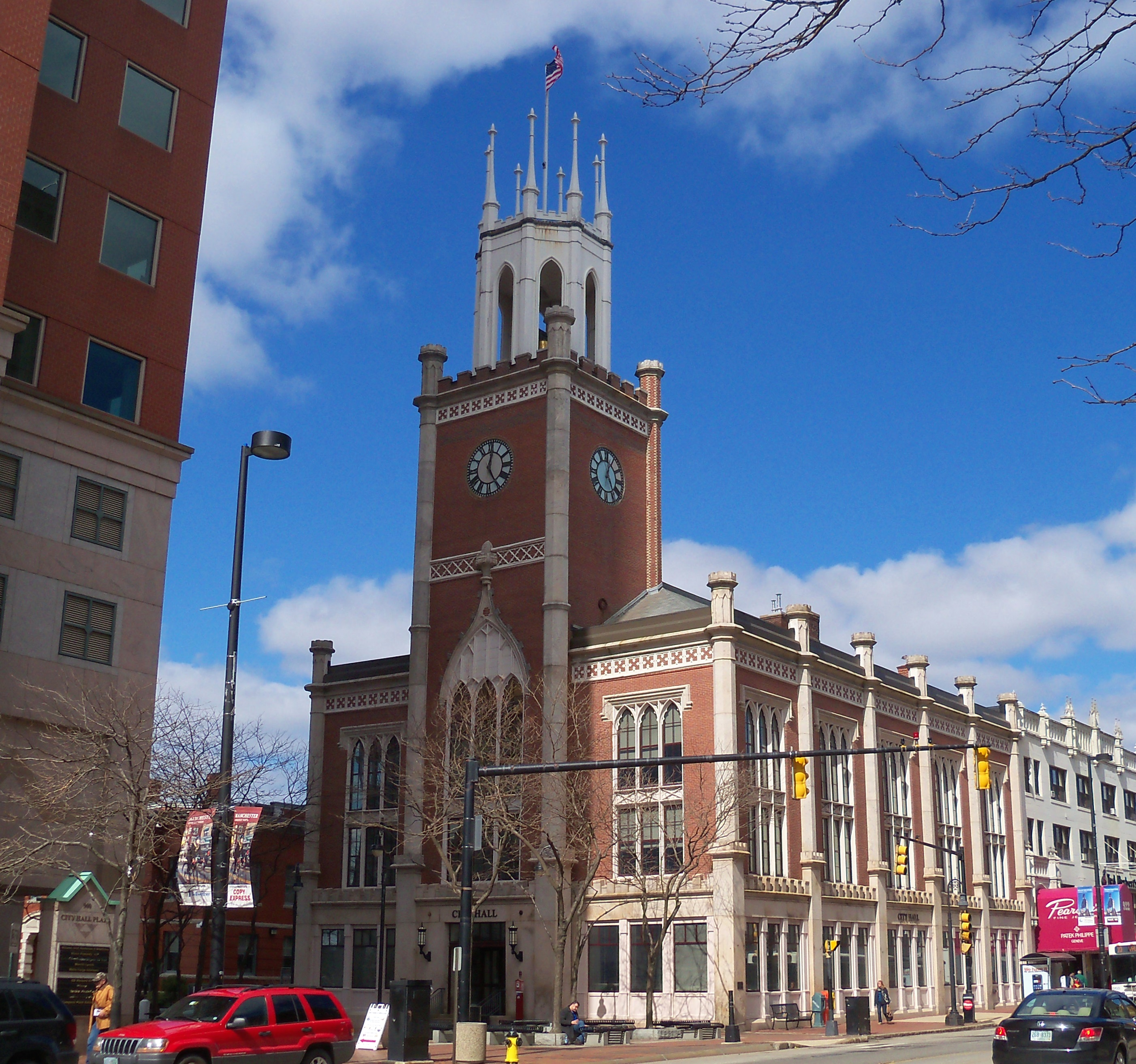
- View of City Hall from Elm Street, 2013.

- Location within New Hampshire Location within the United States
- Interactive map showing the location of Manchester City Hall
- Location: 908 Elm St., Manchester, New Hampshire
- Coordinates: 42°59′28″N 71°27′50″W
- Area: 0.1 acres (0.040 ha)
- Built: 1844
- Architect: Edward Shaw
- Architectural style: Gothic Revival
- NRHP reference No.: 75000233
- Added to NRHP: June 13, 1975

The City Hall of Manchester, New Hampshire, is located at 908 Elm Street, the city's principal commercial thoroughfare. The brick-and-granite three-story structure was built in 1844-45 to a design by Boston architect Edward Shaw, and is a prominent early example of the Gothic Revival style in a civic building. It was listed on the National Register of Historic Places in 1975.

== Description and history ==
Manchester's City Hall is the second building of that name, the first having been built on the same site in 1841, and burned in 1844. It is prominently set in the middle of the downtown, on the west side of Elm Street at its junction with Hanover Street. It is three stories in height, built out of brick with granite trim. It presents a five-bay facade to Elm Street and a three-bay facade to Market Street (now closed off as City Hall Plaza). The center of the three-bay facade projects slightly and rises in a tower two more stories above the building. The bays of the building and its corners are articulated by false buttresses, which rise to squat octagonal columns above the roof edge. Each bay has several narrow Gothic windows rising through the second and third floors. The tower has a clock with multiple faces on its main stage above the roof, which is ringed by a crenellated balustrade and octagonal columns. The top stage consists of an open lantern structure with Gothic openings and pinnacles.

The hall was designed by Edward Shaw, a New Hampshire-born architect based in Boston, Massachusetts. Shaw is best known for a number of publications for builders, some of which received wide circulation. When first built, the Elm Street facade was taken up by retail space on the ground floor (in a style emulating the previous city hall which stood on the site), with city offices above; the main entrance was then through the base of the tower. In 1895 the city took over the entire ground floor, moving the main entry to the center bay on Elm Street. The building entrance has since been relocated back to the tower.

== Gallery of works ==
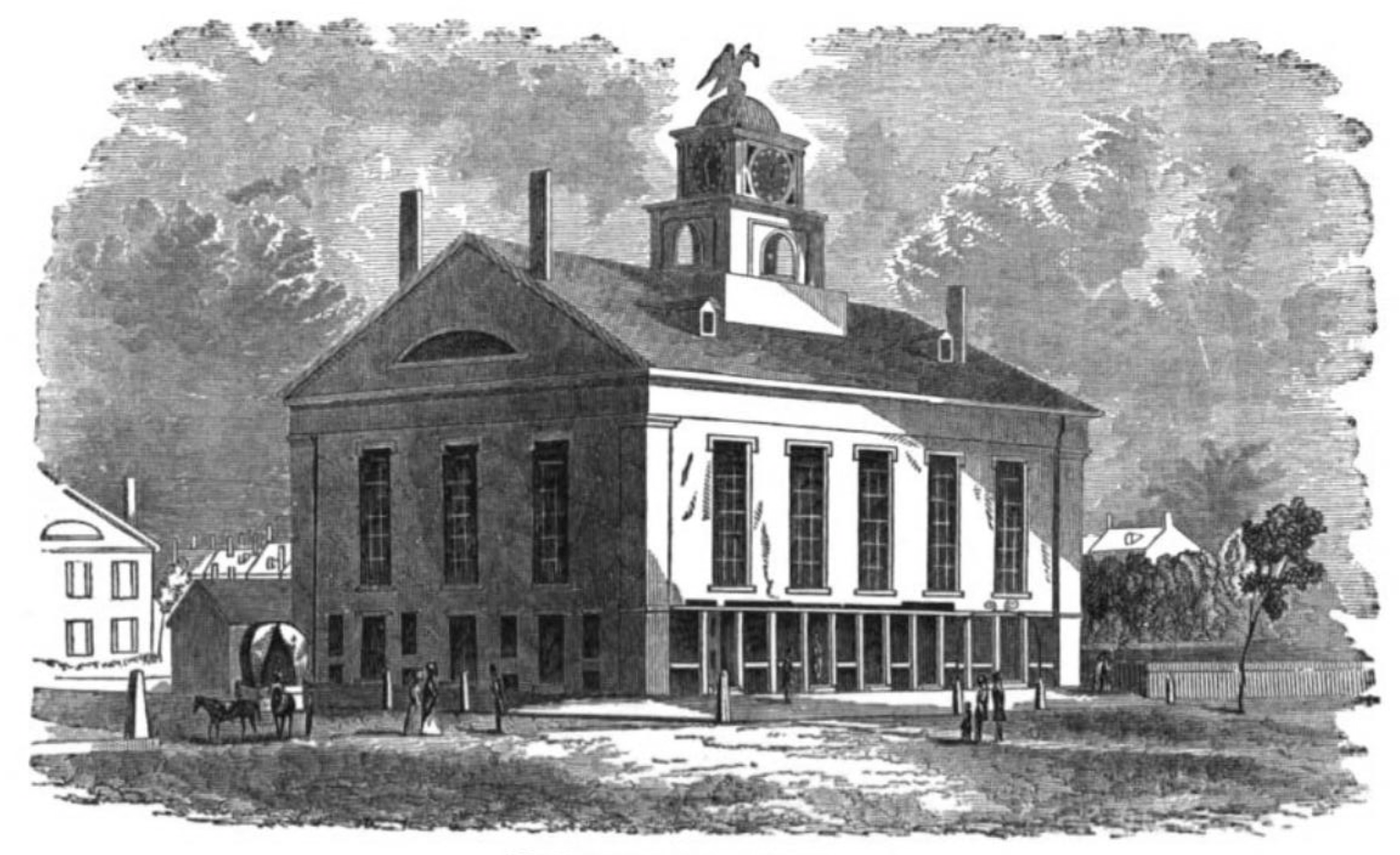
The original town hall, built in 1841 and burned in 1844. From an engraving published in 1852.

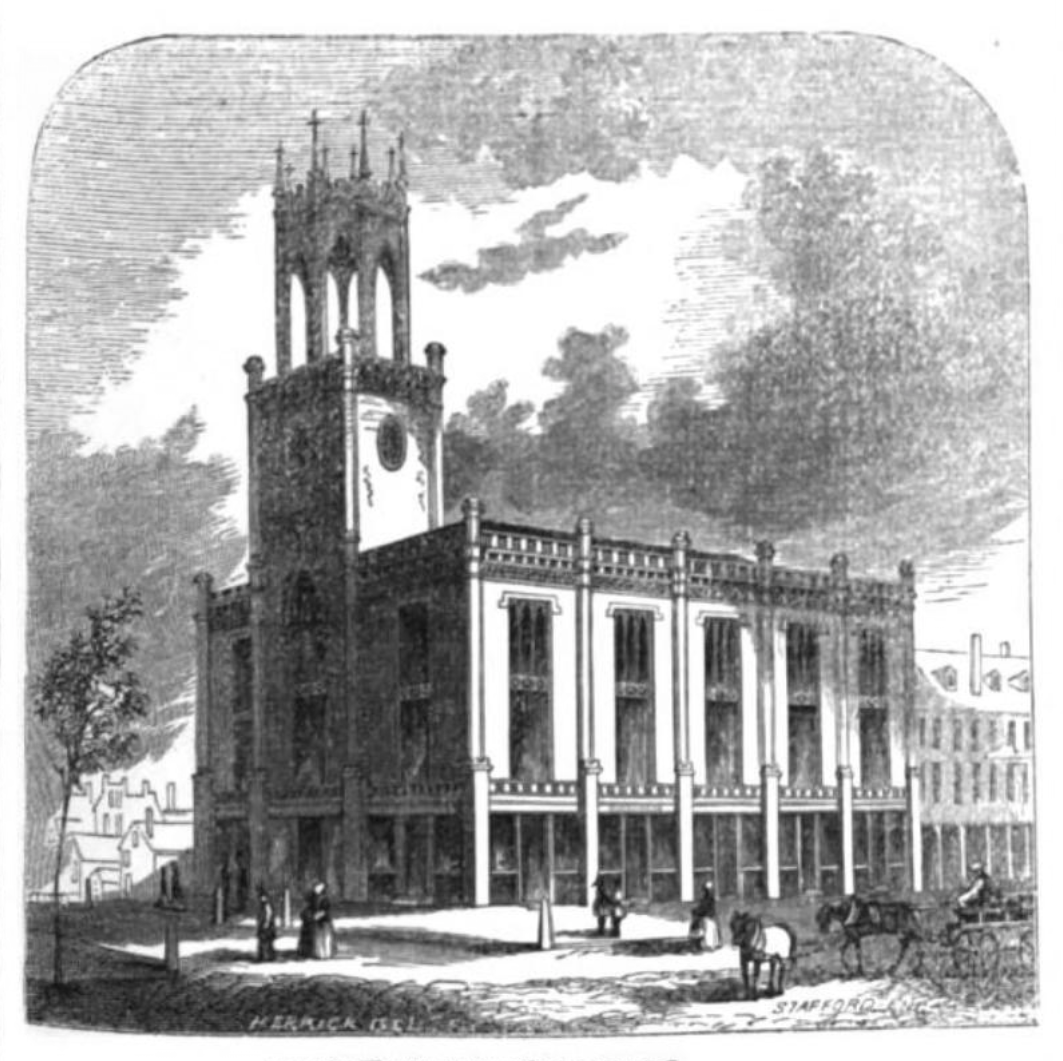
Manchester City Hall as it appeared in 1852.

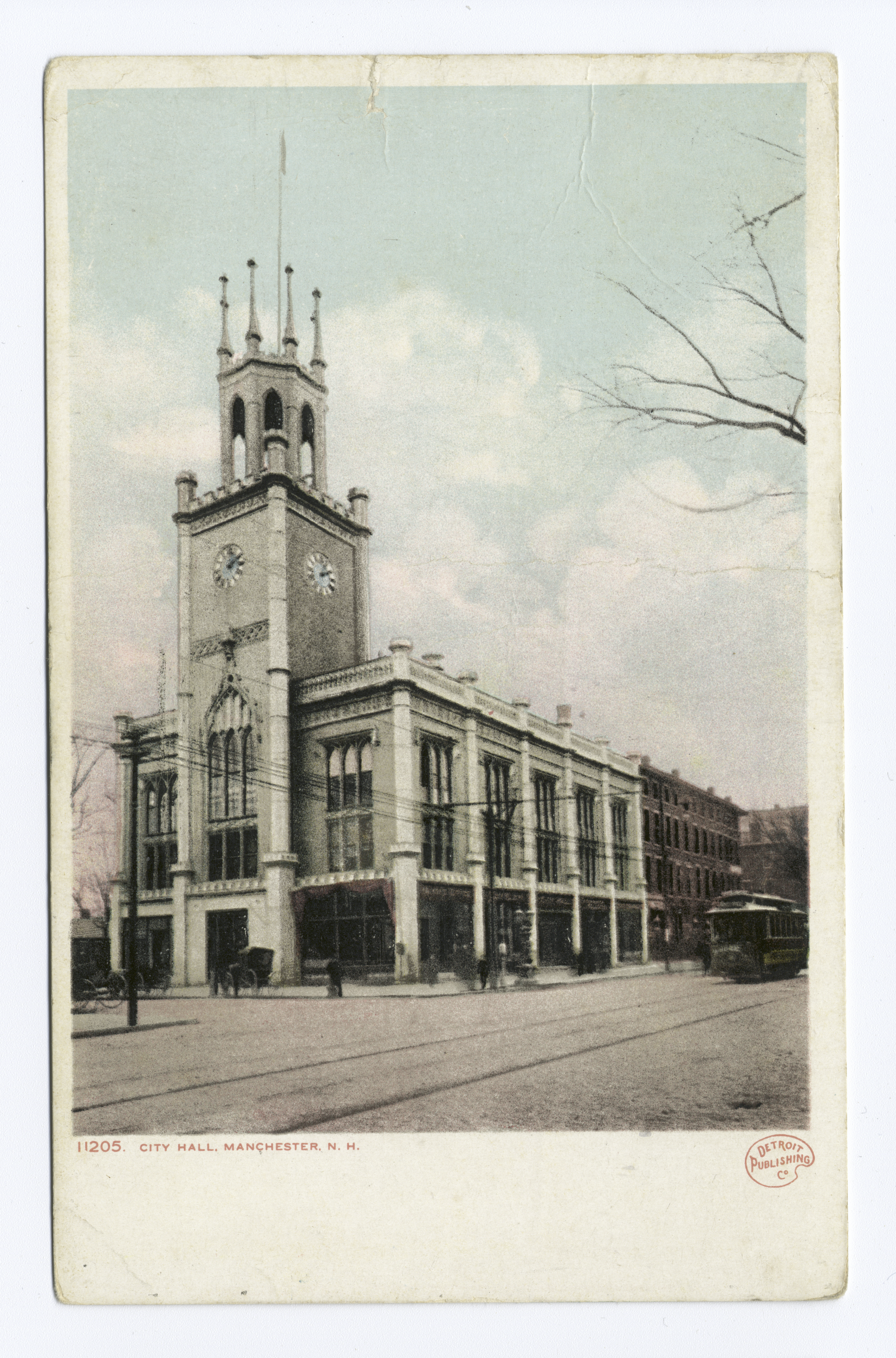
Manchester City Hall as it appeared at the beginning of the twentieth century.

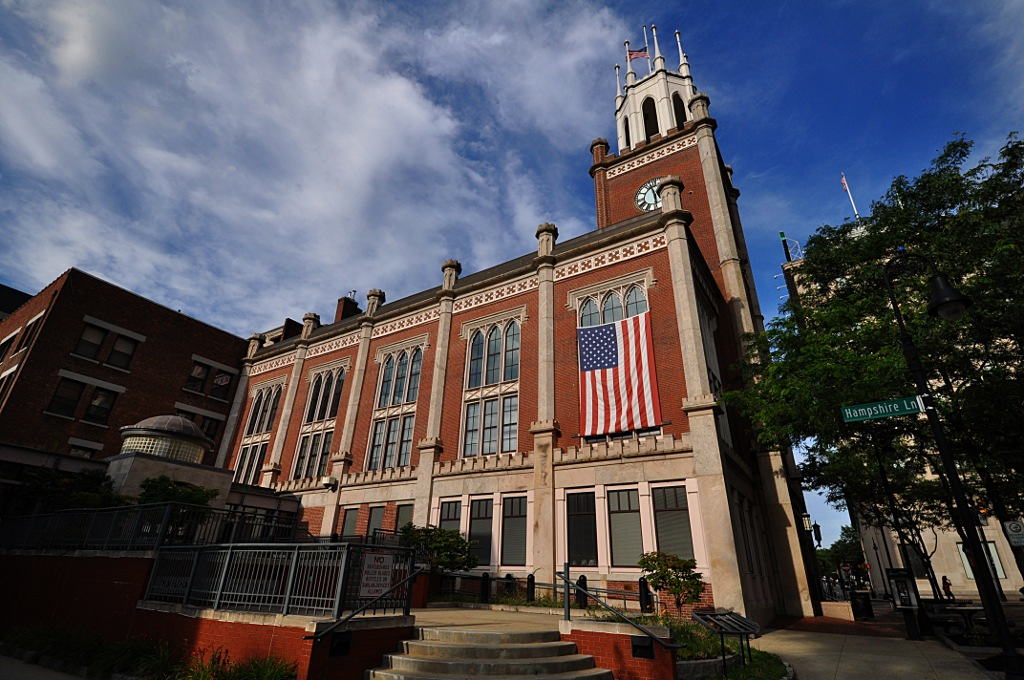
View of Manchester City Hall from City Hall Plaza in 2012.

== See also ==
- National Register of Historic Places listings in Hillsborough County, New Hampshire
