= New Hampshire State Union Armory =

- U.S. National Register of Historic Places
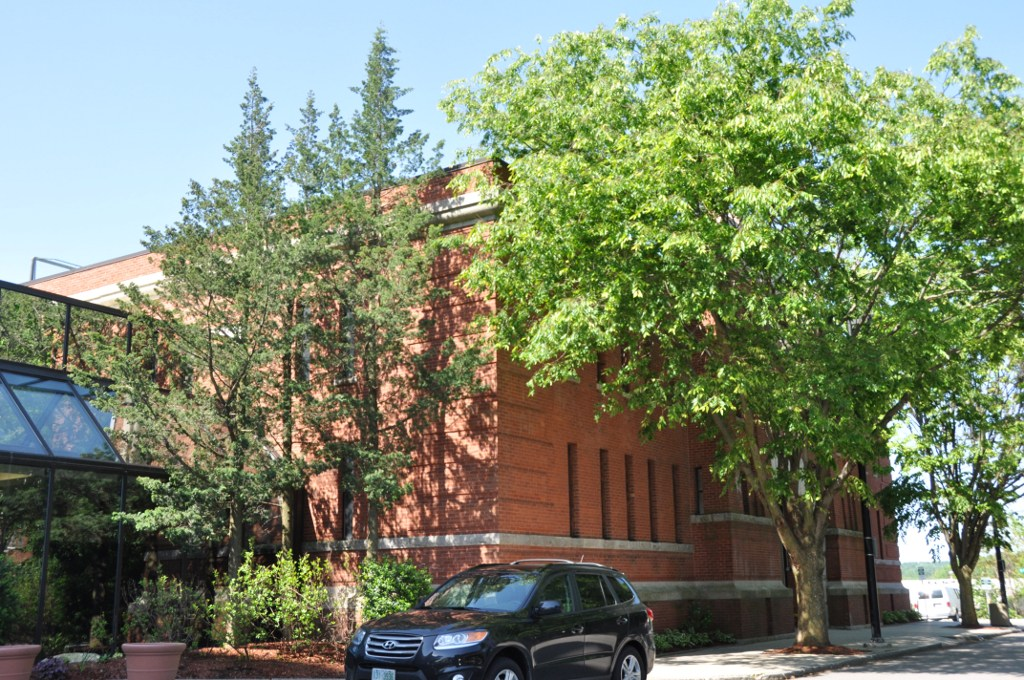

- Location within New Hampshire Location within the United States
- Location: 60 Pleasant St., Manchester, New Hampshire
- Coordinates: 42°59′18″N 71°27′57″W
- Area: 1 acre (0.40 ha)
- Built: 1904
- Built by: Col. Alfred A. Collins
- NRHP reference No.: 82004993
- Added to NRHP: August 10, 1982

The New Hampshire State Union Armory is a historic armory building at 60 Pleasant Street in Manchester, New Hampshire. Built in 1904, this large brick building was the first armory building in the state, and is a distinct example of Romanesque architecture. The building was listed on the National Register of Historic Places in 1982.

== Description and history ==
The New Hampshire State Union Armory is located in downtown Manchester, on the south side of Pleasant Street roughly midway between Elm and Canal Streets. The brick building has two portions: a head house (which faces Pleasant Street), and a drill hall, located behind the head house and extending to West Central Street. It has a fortress-like main entrance, in a projecting section from its main facade that rises two stories and is framed by massive brick pilasters. The drill hall is nominally two stories in height, with a gabled roof, but its basement is fully exposed on the south side due to sloping terrain. A large granite arched entrance provides access to the basement level on that side. One unusual feature of the drill hall is that it has unique supports that can be swung into place to provided added strength to the flooring of the main hall, for use during drill exercises.

The armory was built in 1904 to a design by Alfred A. Collins. It was the state's first armory building, built as part of an effort to centralize and better manage the state militia. It was the first place where all of the principal functions of the militia could be conducted, and equipment could be properly stored.

== See also ==
- National Register of Historic Places listings in Hillsborough County, New Hampshire
