= North Weare Schoolhouse =

- U.S. National Register of Historic Places
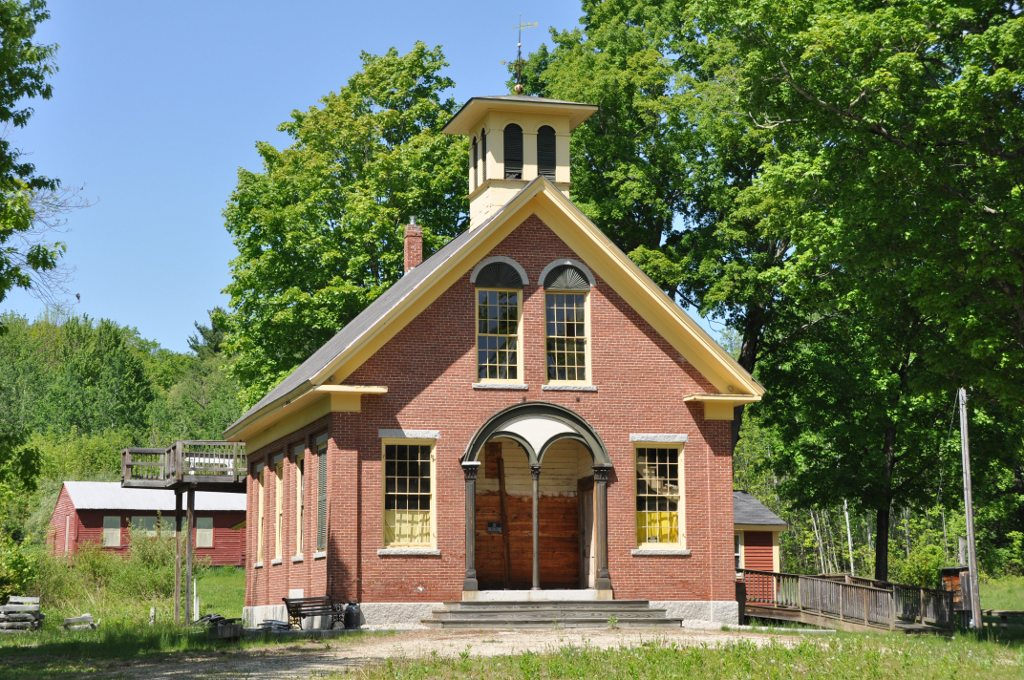

- Location within New Hampshire Location within the United States
- Location: Old Concord Stage Rd., N side, E of the jct. with NH 114, Weare, New Hampshire
- Coordinates: 43°6′40″N 71°44′56″W
- Area: 0.4 acres (0.16 ha)
- Built: c. 1856
- Architectural style: Italianate, Federal, Greek Revival
- NRHP reference No.: 95001051
- Added to NRHP: September 6, 1995

The North Weare Schoolhouse is a historic school building on Old Concord State Road in northern Weare, New Hampshire. Built about 1856, it is a stylistically distinctive vernacular mixing of Federal, Greek Revival, and Italianate styling. It is the most architecturally distinctive of Weare's surviving 19th-century schoolhouses. It was used as a public school until 1952, and then served as a grange hall until the 1980s. The building was listed on the National Register of Historic Places in 1995.

== Description and history ==
The North Weare Schoolhouse is located on Old Concord Stage Road (New Hampshire Route 77), a short way east of its junction with New Hampshire Route 114. It is set back from the road, with a circular drive in front that is fringed by mature trees. The building is a 1½-story brick structure with a gabled roof topped by a square belfry with round-arch louvered openings. The front facade is three bays wide, with entrances recessed in a round-arch opening framed by cast-iron columns. In the gable above there are two sash windows topped by blind rounded fans. The bays on the building sides, and its corners, are articulated by brick pilasters.

The school was built in 1856 to serve the town's 16th school district. It is architecturally the must unusual of the town's 19th-century district schools, and is the only one to be built in brick. It continued in this use until 1952, and was one of the last four district schools to be closed in the town. From 1960 to 1985 it housed the local chapter of the Grange.

== See also ==
- National Register of Historic Places listings in Hillsborough County, New Hampshire
