= T. L. Thorpe Building =

Historic place in New Hampshire, United States

- Formerly listed on the U.S. National Register of Historic Places
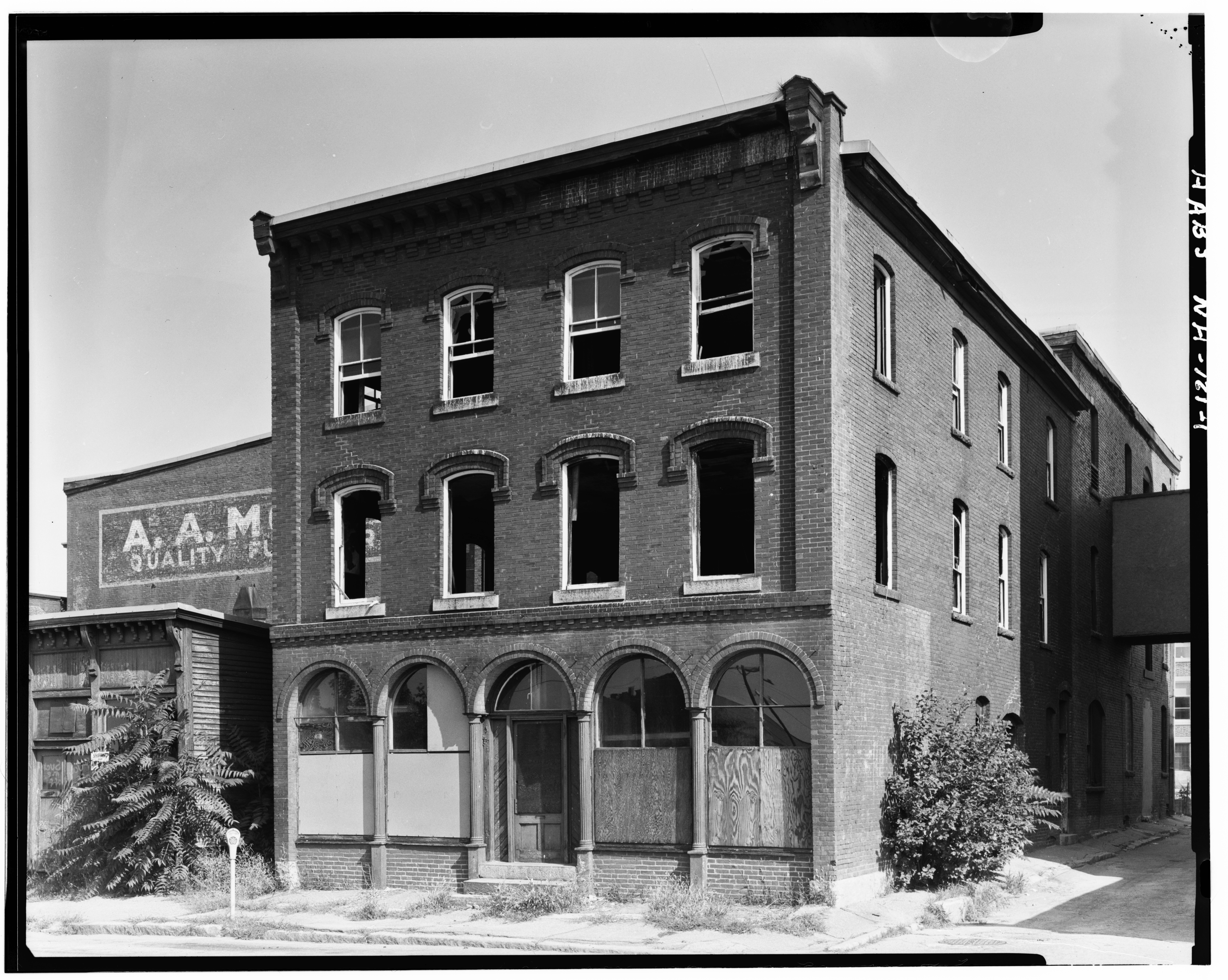

- Location within New Hampshire Location within the United States
- Location: 19 Traction Street, Manchester, New Hampshire
- Coordinates: 42.986972°N 71.463938°W
- Built: 1881
- NRHP reference No.: 82004896

Significant dates
- Added to NRHP: 1982
- Removed from NRHP: 1999

The T. L. Thorpe Building was an historic commercial building located at 19 Traction Street in Manchester, New Hampshire. It was added to the National Register of Historic Places (NRHP) in 1982.

The building was constructed circa 1881 and was named for Thomas L. Thorpe, a prominent textile merchant, who maintained an office upstairs. The first floor was occupied by a produce dealer. Photographs of the building, which was razed in 1982, were taken by the Historic American Buildings Survey around 1933.

The property was removed from the NRHP in 1999. The former site of the building is approximately 500 feet (150 m) west of the current SNHU Arena.

== See also ==
- National Register of Historic Places listings in Hillsborough County, New Hampshire
