= Frank Pierce Carpenter House =

Historic house in New Hampshire, United States

- U.S. National Register of Historic Places
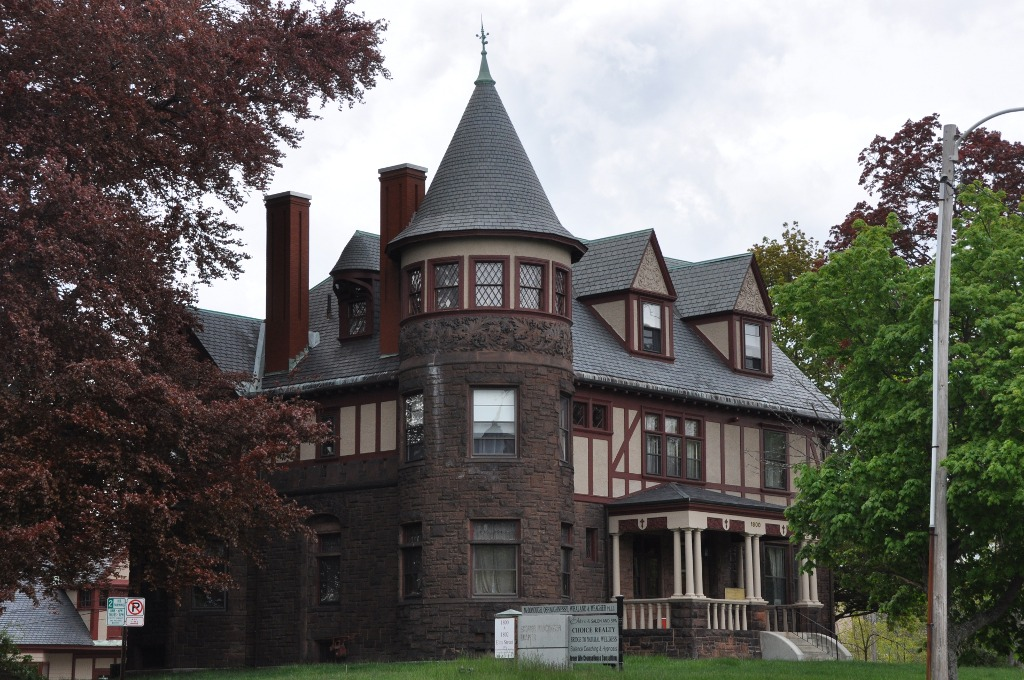

- Location within New Hampshire Location within the United States
- Location: 1800 Elm St., Manchester, New Hampshire
- Coordinates: 43°0′17″N 71°27′57″W
- Area: 1.5 acres (0.61 ha)
- Built: 1891
- Architect: Newcomb, Edgar A. P.
- Architectural style: Queen Anne
- NRHP reference No.: 94000168
- Added to NRHP: March 17, 1994

The Frank Pierce Carpenter House is a historic house at 1800 Elm Street on the north side of Manchester, New Hampshire. Built in 1891 for the president of the Amoskeag Paper Company, it is a fine local example of high-style Queen Anne architecture. It was listed on the National Register of Historic Places in 1994, and was home to the local chapter of the American Red Cross for approximately 71 years from the start of WWII.

It is a privately owned office building protected by the Manchester Historic Association and known as the Carpenter Historic Building, LLC.

== Description and history ==
The Frank Pierce Carpenter House is located north of downtown Manchester, at the northwest corner of Elm Street (U.S. Route 3) and North Street. The house is roughly square in shape, with a three-story turret at its southeast corner and a projecting window bay at its southwest corner. A 2 1/2-story ell which originally housed service facilities projects to the west. The main (eastern) facade is three bays wide: the turret occupies the left bay, and the main entrance the center. The entry is sheltered by a single-story porch supported by clustered Tuscan columns (replacements c. 1970 for originals styled like those on the building's porte-cochere). The interior is lavishly decorated with period woodwork and imported marble.

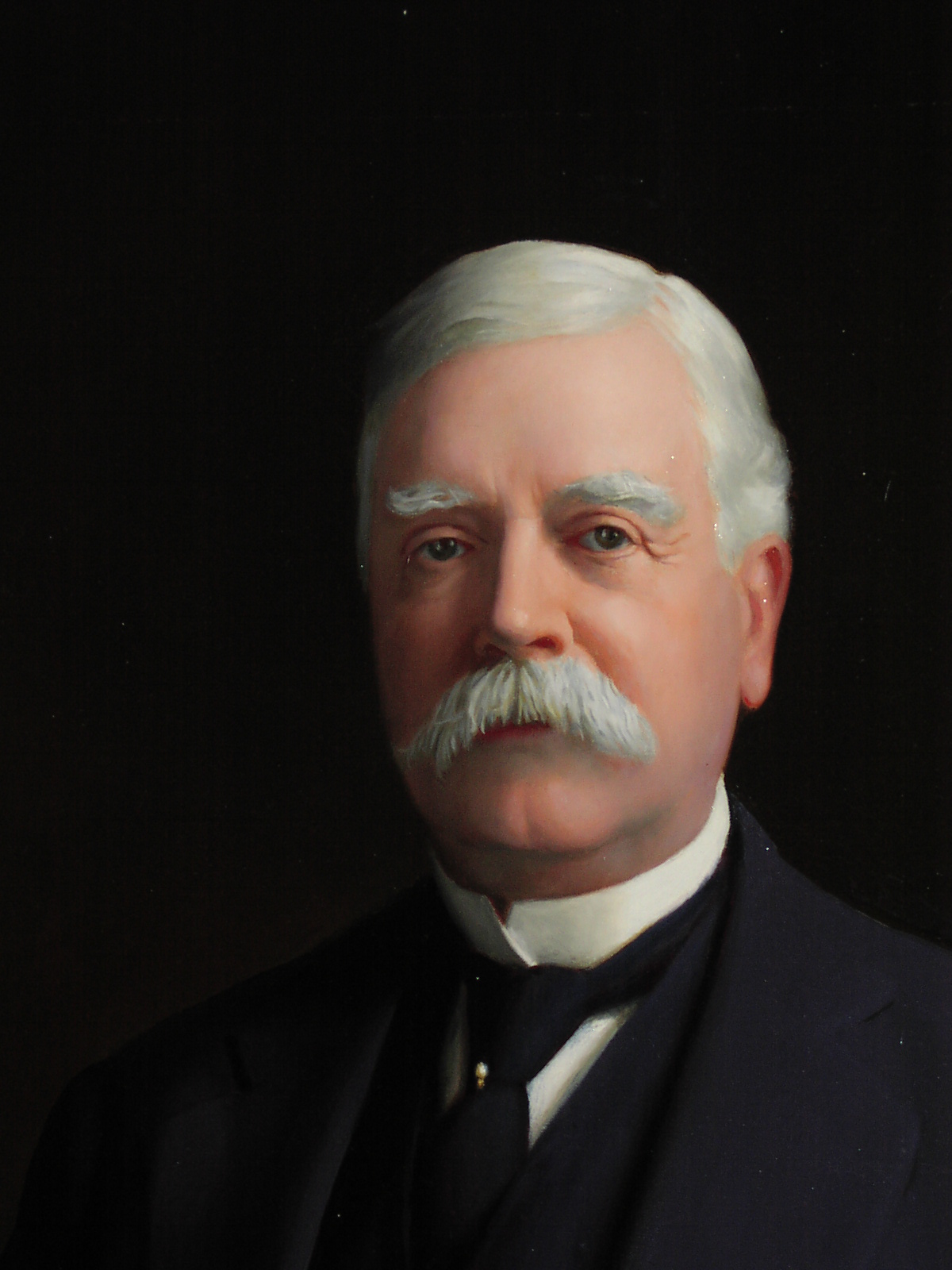
Frank Pierce Carpenter

The house was built in 1891 for Frank Carpenter, then the president of the Amoskeag Paper Company, and a major city benefactor. It was probably designed by Edgar A. P. Newcomb, whom Carpenter had hired to design the city's Carpenter Memorial Library. The multi-acre estate that Carpenter amassed around the house was sold in portions after his death in 1938, and the house was given a temporary lease of the property during World War II. This lease was made effectively permanent after the war, and the property was formally transferred to the Red Cross in 1993 by Carpenter's heirs, subject to preservation easements.

== See also ==
- National Register of Historic Places listings in Hillsborough County, New Hampshire
