= Parker's Store =

- U.S. National Register of Historic Places
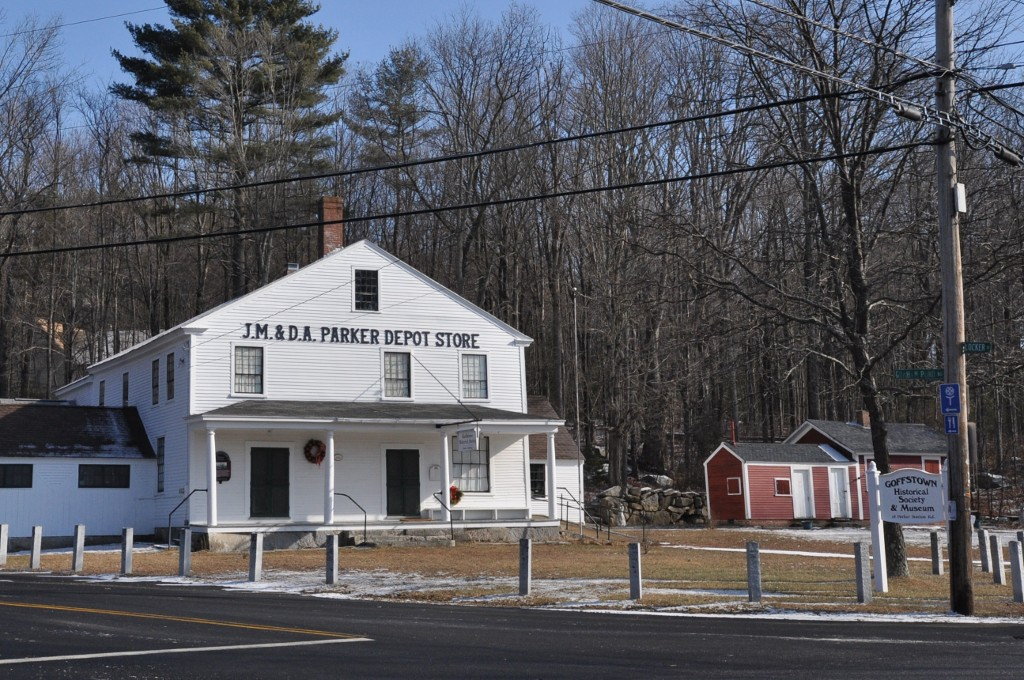

- Location within New Hampshire Location within the United States
- Location: 18 Parker Station Rd., Goffstown, New Hampshire
- Coordinates: 43°1′34″N 71°37′42″W
- Area: 0.5 acres (0.20 ha)
- Architectural style: Greek Revival
- NRHP reference No.: 80000414
- Added to NRHP: May 14, 1980

Parker's Store is a historic retail building at 18 Parker Station Road in Goffstown, New Hampshire. The two-story wood-frame structure was built before 1804, and is one of the state's few surviving early retail structures. It has been home to the Goffstown Historical Society since 1973, when it was donated by the Parker family. The building was listed on the National Register of Historic Places in 1980.

== Description and history ==
The former Parker's Store building is located about 1.5 miles (2.4 km) west of the village center of Goffstown, at the northeast corner of Parker Station Road and Gorham Pond Road. It is a 2½-story wood-frame structure, with a broad gabled roof and clapboarded exterior. Its front is spanned by a single-story hip-roofed porch, supported by round columns with Doric heads. Its facade is spatially four bays wide, although the center-left bay is blank on both levels. There are two entrances, one each in the leftmost and center-right bays, and a large multi-pane window in the rightmost bay on the ground floor. Nine over six sash windows fill the same three bays on the second level.

William Parker, descendant of one of the area's early settlers, is known to have operated a tavern and hostelry from his home, located near a crossing of the Piscataquog River built to accommodate the ship masts being transported on the road. It was used by members of the Parker family as a retail space until 1872. In the 20th century it was used a space for community groups, and was donated by the Parkers to the Goffstown Historical Society in 1973. The store was the nucleus of a village that was important enough in the 19th century to merit a station when the railroad was built into the area.

== See also ==
- National Register of Historic Places listings in Hillsborough County, New Hampshire
