= Milford Town House and Library Annex =

- U.S. National Register of Historic Places
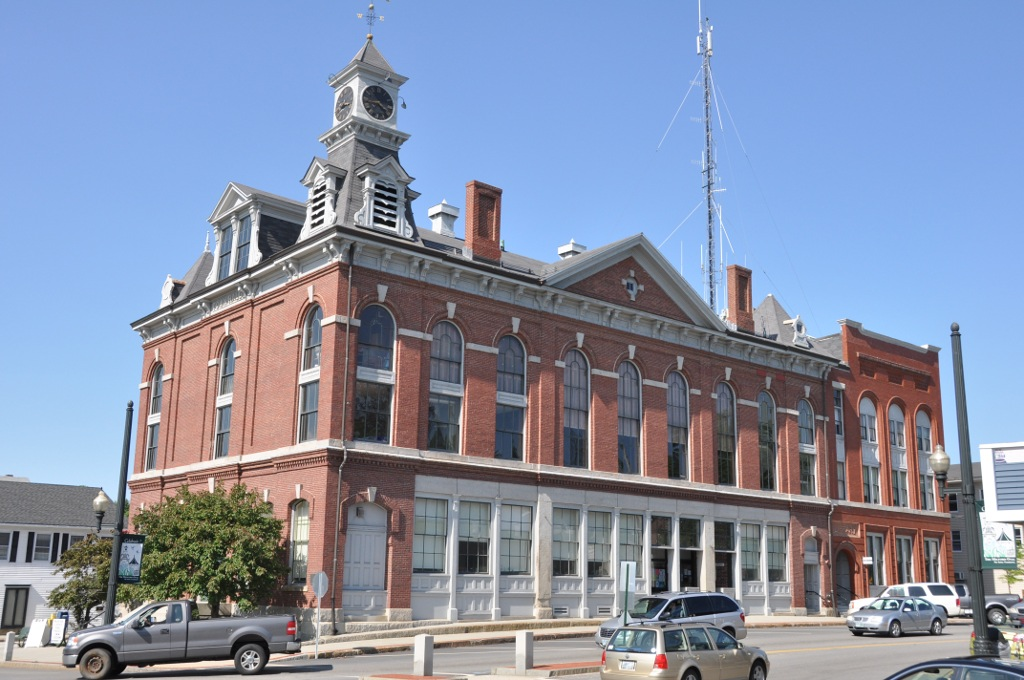

- Location within New Hampshire Location within the United States
- Location: Nashua St., Milford, New Hampshire
- Coordinates: 42°50′8″N 71°38′58″W
- Area: less than one acre
- Built: 1870
- Architect: Bryant & Rogers; Frederick W. Stickney
- Architectural style: Late 19th And Early 20th Century American Movements, Second Empire, Italianate
- NRHP reference No.: 88001436
- Added to NRHP: December 1, 1988

The Milford Town House and Library Annex, now just the Milford Town Hall, is a historic municipal building occupying a prominent position facing the central oval in Milford, New Hampshire. It was built in 1869-70 and enlarged in 1891, and was designed by renowned architect Gridley J. F. Bryant. It is a significant local example of Italianate and Second Empire architecture. The building was listed on the National Register of Historic Places in 1988.

== Description and history ==
The Milford Town Hall is located in the heart of Milford, on the east side of its central oval. The town house portion, which presents the main facade to the oval, was built in 1869, and is a two-story structure built of brick with granite trim. It was designed by Bryant & Rogers of Boston, and is stylistically similar to Gridley J. F. Bryant's other municipal and civic works of the period. The Italianate structure has a bell tower in which is a Paul Revere bell cast in 1802, which was hung in Milford's first town hall. The library annex was added to the rear of the building (along Nashua Street) in 1891, extending the south facade of the building from nine to twelve bays. Lowell architect Frederick W. Stickney built it using a different type of brick, but stylistic elements tie it to the original structure.

The Nashua Street facade originally housed commercial spaces on the ground floor, but the spaces were gradually taken over by municipal offices. The upper floor was originally built to serve as a space for the local Masonic lodge, but most of its trappings and finishes were removed after that use ended in 1939. Although the annex was designed primarily to house the town library, its basement was first used to house the fire department, and more recently housed emergency ambulance services. The library occupied the facilities until a new library was built across the street in 1951.

== See also ==
- National Register of Historic Places listings in Hillsborough County, New Hampshire
