= Weare Town House =

Historic New England meeting house

- U.S. National Register of Historic Places
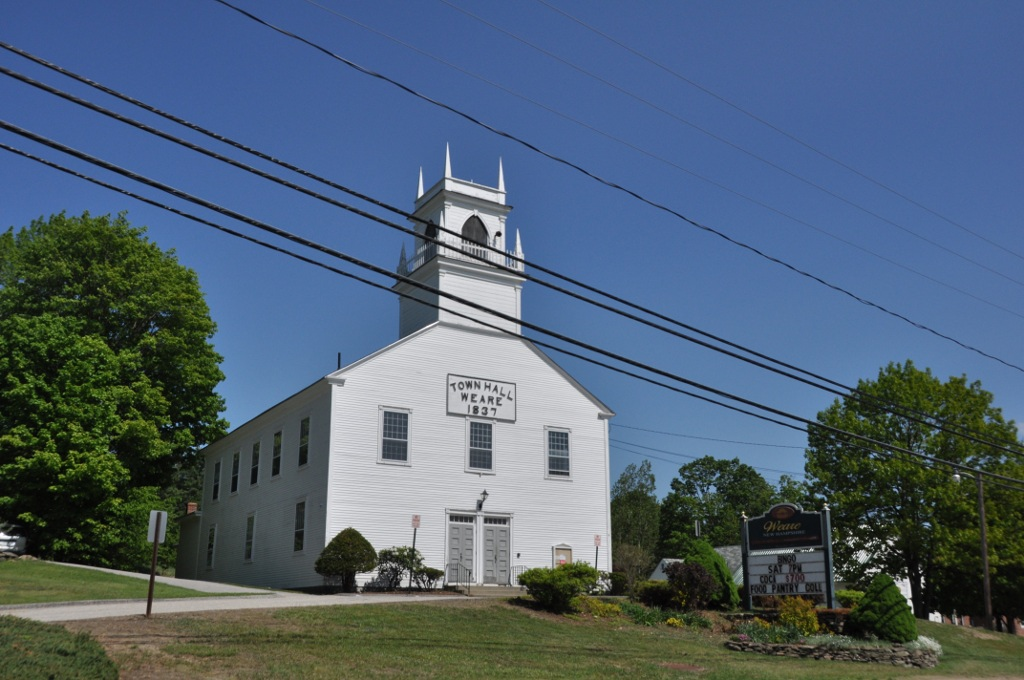

- Location within New Hampshire Location within the United States
- Location: NH 114, Weare, New Hampshire
- Coordinates: 43°5′45″N 71°43′51″W
- Area: less than one acre
- Built: 1837
- Architectural style: Gothic Revival, Federal
- NRHP reference No.: 85003034
- Added to NRHP: December 2, 1985

The Weare Town House is a historic New England meeting house on New Hampshire Route 114 in Weare, New Hampshire. Built in 1837, it is a good example of a period town hall/church combination with Federal and Gothic Revival features. Although its religious use has ended, it continues to be used for town offices as well as civic and social functions. The building was listed on the National Register of Historic Places in 1985.

== Description and history ==
The Weare Town House is located in the town center of Weare, on the east side of New Hampshire Route 114 (its principal north-south route), about 500 yards (460 m) north of Memorial Drive. It is a 2½-story frame structure, covered by a gabled roof and finished in wooden clapboards. The main facade is fairly plain, with a double-door entrance at the center, and three sash windows on the second level. A two-stage tower rises above the facade, with pinnacles at the corners of each stage, and a louvered belfry in the second stage. The belfry houses a bell manufactured in 1837 by George Holbook of East Medway (now Millis), Massachusetts; Holbrook had received his training in the bell foundry of Paul Revere.

The hall was built in 1837 to serve both as a town meeting space and a place for the local Universalist congregation to meet. The interior was originally arranged so that town meetings were held on the first floor and church services on the second. The upstairs was adapted for use as a high school in 1919, and has also been home to local fraternal organizations. The building continues to be used for town facilities, and the meeting space is rented out for private social functions in addition to its civic uses.

== See also ==
- National Register of Historic Places listings in Hillsborough County, New Hampshire
