= Varney School =

- U.S. National Register of Historic Places
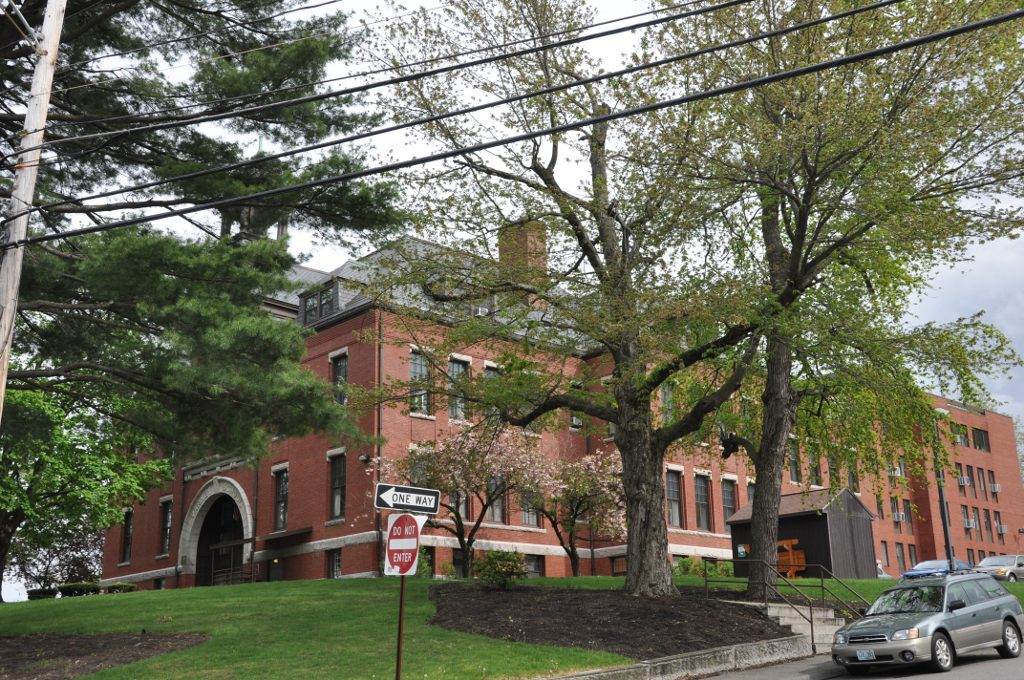

- Location within New Hampshire Location within the United States
- Location: 84 Varney St., Manchester, New Hampshire
- Coordinates: 42°58′49″N 71°28′43″W
- Area: 1.4 acres (0.57 ha)
- Built: 1890
- Architect: Stickney, Frederick W.
- Architectural style: Late Victorian
- NRHP reference No.: 82001685
- Added to NRHP: January 11, 1982

The Varney School is a historic school building at 84 Varney Street in Manchester, New Hampshire. Built in 1890 and enlarged in 1914-15, it is a well-preserved example of a Late Victorian school building, and an emblem of the growth in that time of the city's west side. The building was listed on the National Register of Historic Places in 1982. It has been converted to residential use.

== Description and history ==
The former Varney School building is located southwest of downtown Manchester, on the south side of Varney Street at its junction with Bowman Street. It is a 2½-story red brick building, consisting of a cruciform main block, to which a wing has been added to the rear. It is covered by a slate hip roof and is trimmed in granite. The main facade has a central gabled bay, with the main entrance set in a large round-arch recess lined with wooden paneling. The gable has a half-round light at its center, and is surmounted by an open square belfry capped by a pyramidal roof and finial.

The main portion of the school was built in 1890, due to residential growth in the surrounding Piscataquog Village neighborhood, with the expansion wing added in 1914–15. It was designed by Frederick Stickney of Lowell, Massachusetts, whose work made provision for its eventual expansion. When first opened, it housed six classrooms. The south wing, originally a single story, was raised to two stories in the 1915 addition. The building was named for David Blake Varney, who was mayor of Manchester at the time of its construction.

== See also ==
- National Register of Historic Places listings in Hillsborough County, New Hampshire
