= Peterborough Town House =

- U.S. National Register of Historic Places
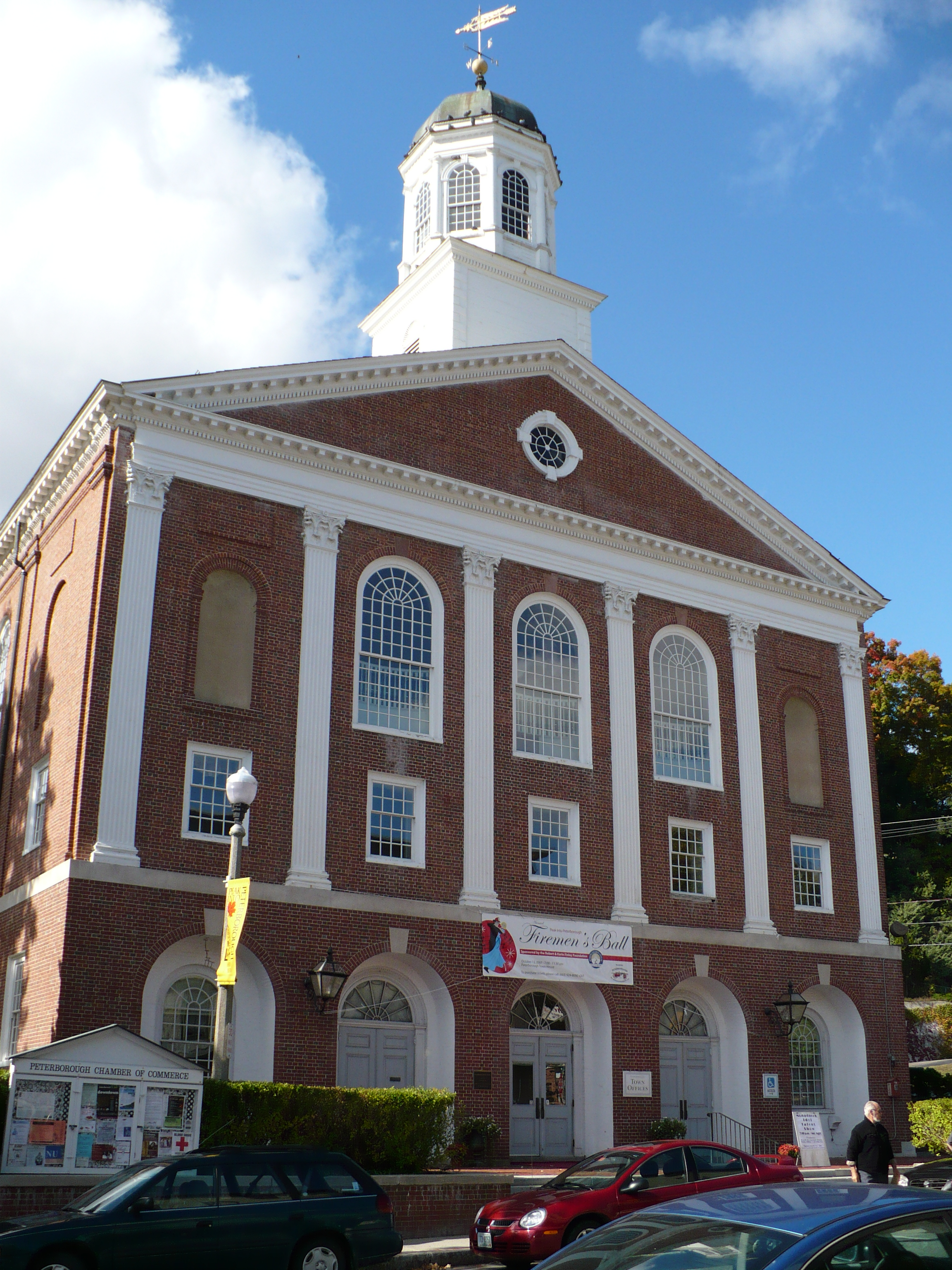

- Location within New Hampshire Location within the United States
- Location: 1 Grove St., Peterborough, New Hampshire
- Coordinates: 42°52′38″N 71°57′4″W
- Area: 0.3 acres (0.12 ha)
- Built: 1918
- Architect: Little & Russell
- Architectural style: Colonial Revival
- NRHP reference No.: 96000194
- Added to NRHP: February 29, 1996

The Peterborough Town House is the town hall serving Peterborough, New Hampshire. Located at Grove and Main Streets in downtown, the 1918 building is a significant local example of Colonial Revival architecture, and was listed on the National Register of Historic Places in 1996.

== Description and history ==
The Peterborough Town House occupies a prominent location in downtown Peterborough, at the southwest corner of Main and Grove Streets. It is a two-story brick building, covered by a gabled roof. The main facade, facing Grove Street, is divided into five bays, which consist of round-arched openings on the first level. The bays of the tall upper level are divided by pilasters which support a modillioned entablature and gabled pediment with oculus window. The building is topped by a small octagonal tower. In the interior, the lower level is taken up by town offices, while the upper level houses a large, high-ceilinged auditorium with a balcony at the front of the building and a stage at the back.

The hall was completed in 1918, after the previous town hall (located on the same site) was extensively damaged by fire in 1916. It was designed by architect Benjamin F. W. Russell of Little & Russell, a part-time resident of Peterborough who had worked for architect Guy Lowell. The design resembles that of Faneuil Hall in Boston, Massachusetts, which is described as a possible inspiration for its features. The building continues to serve its intended function.

== See also ==
- National Register of Historic Places listings in Hillsborough County, New Hampshire
