= William Peabody House =

Historic house in New Hampshire, United States

- U.S. National Register of Historic Places
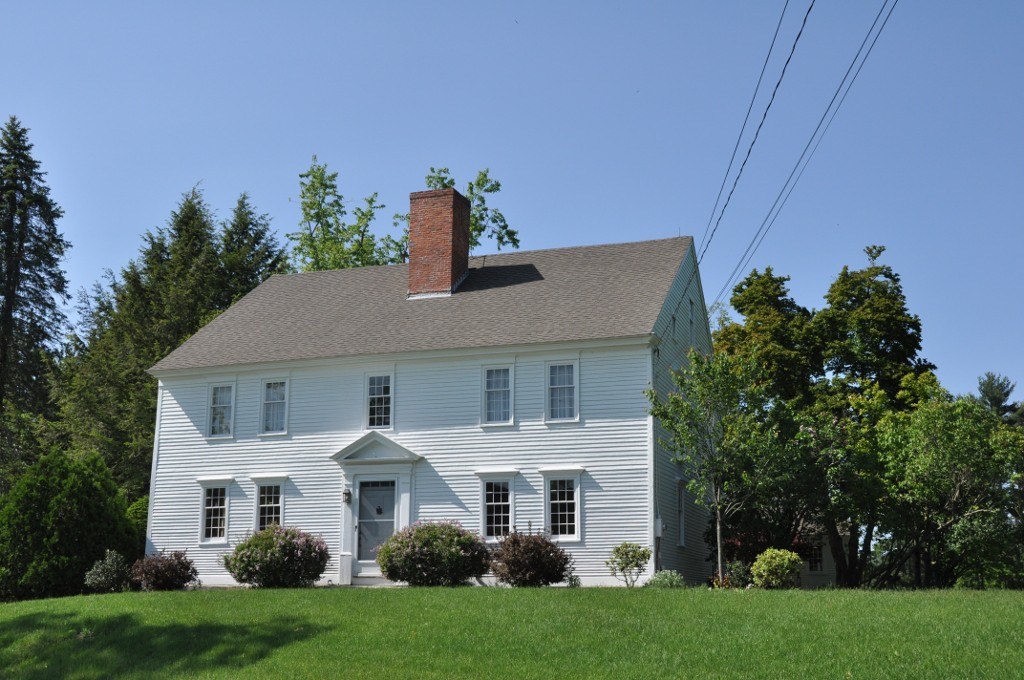

- Location within New Hampshire Location within the United States
- Location: N. River Rd., Milford, New Hampshire
- Coordinates: 42.84437°N 71.66587°W
- Area: 11.7 acres (4.7 ha)
- Built: 1740
- Architectural style: Georgian
- NRHP reference No.: 79000200
- Added to NRHP: November 30, 1979

The William Peabody House is a historic house on North River Road in Milford, New Hampshire. This 2 1/2-story wood-frame house was built c. 1740 by William Peabody, the first English settler of the Milford area, and remains a good example of Georgian residential architecture despite a 1973 fire. The house was listed on the National Register of Historic Places in 1979.

== Description and history ==
The William Peabody House stands on over 11 acres (4.5 ha) of land overlooking the Souhegan River, northeast of Milford center. The house stands on the north side of North River Road, which roughly bisects the property. The house is a 2 1/2-story wood-frame structure, with a gabled roof, central chimney, and clapboarded exterior. The main facade is five bays wide, with the center entrance flanked by pilasters and topped by a transom window and gabled pediment. First-floor windows have corniced sills. The interior follows a center chimney plan, with parlors on either side of the chimney, and a keeping room extending the width of the building behind the chimney. Original features include wide floor boards, gunstock timber framing elements, and some paneling. Some elements are careful reproductions, based on photographs and elements that survived the 1973 fire.

William Peabody, a native of Boxford, Massachusetts, is the first known English settler of the area that is now Milford. He arrived in 1740, clearing land that had been awarded to his father for service in King Philip's War. It was occupied in the 18th and 19th centuries by several generations of locally prominent Peabodys.

== See also ==
- National Register of Historic Places listings in Hillsborough County, New Hampshire
