= Caleb Whittaker Place =

Historic house in New Hampshire, United States

- U.S. National Register of Historic Places
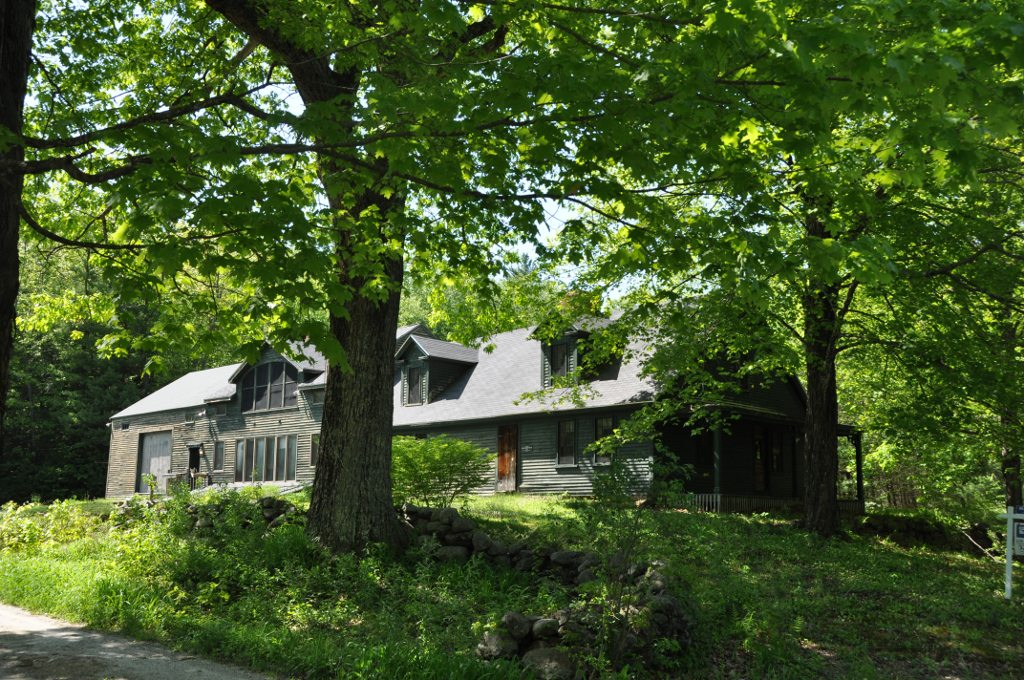

- Location within New Hampshire Location within the United States
- Location: Perkins Pond Rd., Weare, New Hampshire
- Coordinates: 43°2′46″N 71°44′29″W
- Area: 6 acres (2.4 ha)
- Built: 1765
- NRHP reference No.: 83001143
- Added to NRHP: August 3, 1983

The Caleb Whittaker Place is a historic house on Perkins Pond Road in Weare, New Hampshire. Probably built about 1765 by an early settler, it is one of the oldest surviving buildings in the town, notable for its remarkably unaltered interior. The house was listed on the National Register of Historic Places in 1983.

== Description and history ==
The Caleb Whittaker Place is located in a remote rural setting of southwestern Weare, on the west side of Perkins Pond Road north of Peacock Hill Road. The oldest portion of the house is a simple three-bay Cape-style structure, 1 1/2 stories in height with an unfinished attic space, with what is now the central chimney offset on its west side. On the far side of the chimney a similar section was built, probably not long after the first section, but it was never finished. The finished portions of interior include deeply worn wooden flooring, horizontal wood paneling on the walls, and doors fastened with leather strap hinges.

The house is believed to have been built by Caleb Whittaker, the son of one of Weare's first settlers, who may have arrived as early as 1753. The unfinished left side of the house was probably used for storage and animal shelter in the early days, and remained unfinished until 1977, when care was taken to preserve the original hand-hewn timbers. The exterior of the house was resided in 1902, at which time dormers and a porch were added. Because the house was tied up in estate litigation for many years in the 20th century, a number of features have survived inside that are often lost due to modernization.

== See also ==
- National Register of Historic Places listings in Hillsborough County, New Hampshire
