= Thomas Russell Hubbard House =

Historic house in New Hampshire, United States

- U.S. National Register of Historic Places
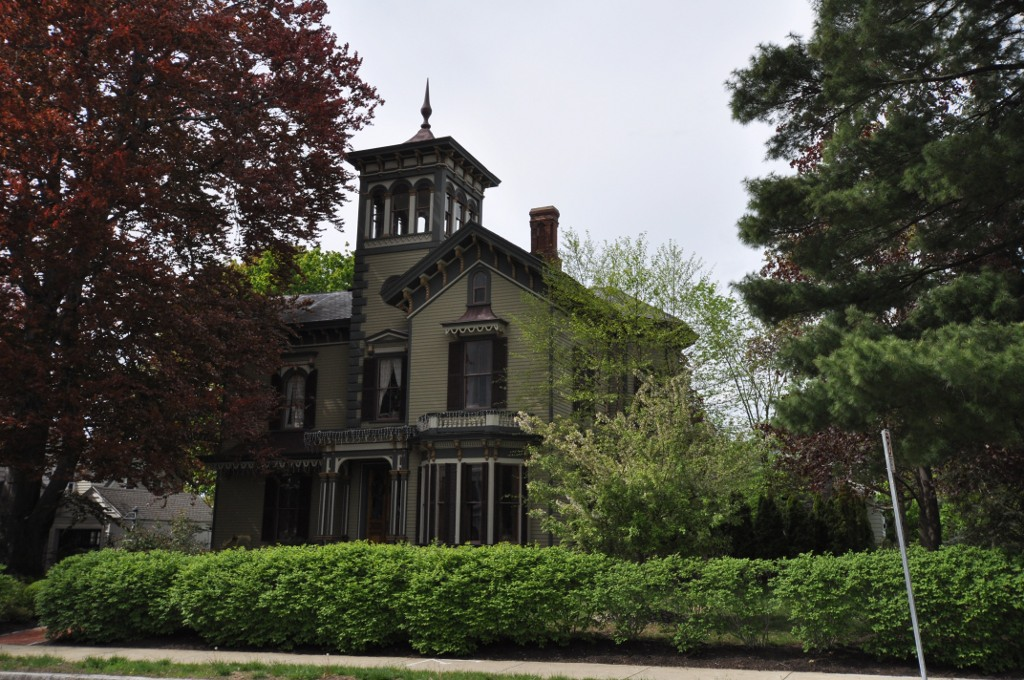

- Location within New Hampshire Location within the United States
- Location: 220 Myrtle St., Manchester, New Hampshire
- Coordinates: 42°59′54″N 71°27′17″W
- Area: 0.3 acres (0.12 ha)
- Built: 1867
- Architect: Hubbard, Thomas Russell
- Architectural style: Italian Villa
- NRHP reference No.: 88000177
- Added to NRHP: March 8, 1988

The Thomas Russell Hubbard House is a historic house at 220 Myrtle Street in Manchester, New Hampshire. The 2½-story wood-frame house was built in 1867, by a farmer turned businessman and a prosperous owner of a factory and lumberyard, and is an exceptionally elaborate Italianate villa. It was listed on the National Register of Historic Places in 1988.

== Description and history ==
The Thomas Russell Hubbard House is located in a residential area northeast of downtown Manchester, on the north side of Myrtle Street and across Maple Street from Wagner Park. It is a 2½-story wood-frame structure, with a complex roofline. It is notable for its four-story tower, with quoined corners and an open fourth level with round arch windows. It has the deep, bracketed eaves typical of the Italianate style, and irregular massing with many projecting sections. The interior of the house is a showcase of its original owner's lumber products, with high quality woodwork using a wide variety of woods, and fine marble fireplace surrounds.

The house was built in 1867 on an entire city block of land purchased by Thomas Russell Hubbard in 1864 from the Amoskeag Manufacturing Company. Hubbard grew up on a farm, and was a self-made businessman producing wooden window sashes, doors, and window blinds, as well as operating a local lumber yard. When built, the house lot afforded fine views to west, over the Merrimack River to the nearby hills. A later owner of the house was David B. Varney, who served as mayor of Manchester in the 1890s. The house originally had a period carriage house, but that was demolished when the property was subdivided for further development.

== See also ==
- National Register of Historic Places listings in Hillsborough County, New Hampshire
