= Old County Road South Historic District =

Historic district in New Hampshire, United States

- U.S. National Register of Historic Places
- U.S. Historic district
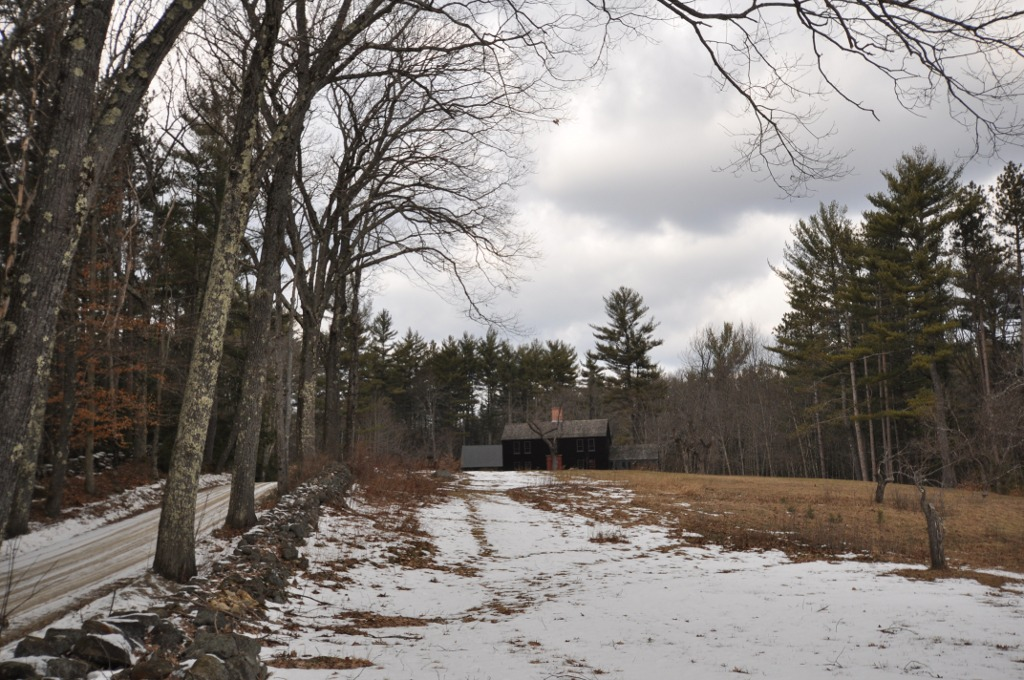
- View of Old County Road

- Location within New Hampshire Location within the United States
- Location: Old County Road South, Pratt/Clark Road, Birsall Road, Francestown, New Hampshire
- Coordinates: 42°58′27″N 71°48′22″W
- Area: 500 acres (200 ha)
- Architectural style: Greek Revival, Georgian, Federal
- NRHP reference No.: 80000413
- Added to NRHP: May 15, 1980

The Old County Road South Historic District is a rural historic district encompassing a well-preserved collection of 18th and early 19th-century rural farm properties in Francestown, New Hampshire. It includes nine houses, whose construction dates from 1774 to 1806, and the only two extant 18th-century saltbox-style houses in the town. There is also a Cape-style house built using the relatively rare vertical-plank method of framing, and there are several surviving 19th-century barns. The district covers 500 acres (200 ha) along all or part of Old County Road South, Pratt (Clark) Road, and Birdsall Road. The district was listed on the National Register of Historic Places in 1980.

Old County Road South was among the first areas to be settled in Francestown. It was home to Moses Bradford, the town's first Congregationalist pastor, and William Starrett, a leading force in both the church and the local government. The Bradford House (c. 1790) is a particularly fine example of Georgian architecture, while Starrett's house (1806) is one of the town's first brick houses, and is set on farmland with fine views. Three members of the Dodge family, including Simon, another of the town's early settlers, built houses in the district, and were prominent in the town economy, operating a local mill. The mill stood in the area, but now only foundational and archaeological evidence of it remain. Other archaeological remains in the district include a tannery site, operated by the Farnums, whose 1790 Georgian-style house was updated in the 1830s with Greek Revival features.

== See also ==
- National Register of Historic Places listings in Hillsborough County, New Hampshire
