= Weston Observatory (Manchester, New Hampshire) =

Historic place in New Hampshire, United States

- U.S. National Register of Historic Places
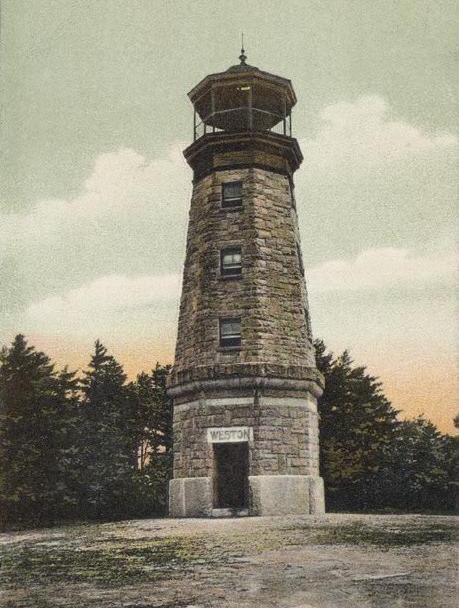
- 1906 postcard view

- Location within New Hampshire Location within the United States
- Location: Oak Hill, Derryfield Park, Manchester, New Hampshire
- Coordinates: 43°0′4″N 71°26′21″W
- Area: 0.7 acres (0.28 ha)
- Built: 1897
- Built by: Head & Dowst
- Architect: Davis & Raynes
- NRHP reference No.: 75000128
- Added to NRHP: May 28, 1975

The Weston Observatory is a historic folly on Oak Hill, the high point of Derryfield Park in Manchester, New Hampshire. Built in 1897, the granite tower is a prominent local landmark, given to the city by James A. Weston, a Manchester native who served twice as governor of New Hampshire. The tower was listed on the National Register of Historic Places in 1975.

== Description and history ==
The Weston Observatory is located near the center of Derryfield Park, at the summit of Oak Hill, a prominence that affords fine views of the city to the west. It is an octagonal granite tower standing 66 feet (20 m) tall. Its base consists of several large pieces of cut granite, with the entrance at the west side, surmounted by a lintel engraved with Weston's name. A heavy cornice encircles the tower at the top of the first level. Most of the tower is rustically finished stone, laid in random coursing that gradually decreases in diameter. The top level is an open pavilion, topped by an octagonal cupola supported by slender metal columns. Narrow windows illuminate the interior of the tower, which houses a circular iron staircase.

The tower was built in 1897 by the city using funds bequested by James Weston, and is the only surviving structure related to his life in the city. It was originally open to the public during the warmer months of the year, but was commandeered for military use during the Second World War, and was thereafter used to house police transmitters. It was not well maintained by the city and allowed to fall into disrepair, but has been restored. Now surrounded by an iron fence, it is not normally open to the public.

== See also ==
- National Register of Historic Places listings in Hillsborough County, New Hampshire
