= Hillsborough Mills =

- U.S. National Register of Historic Places
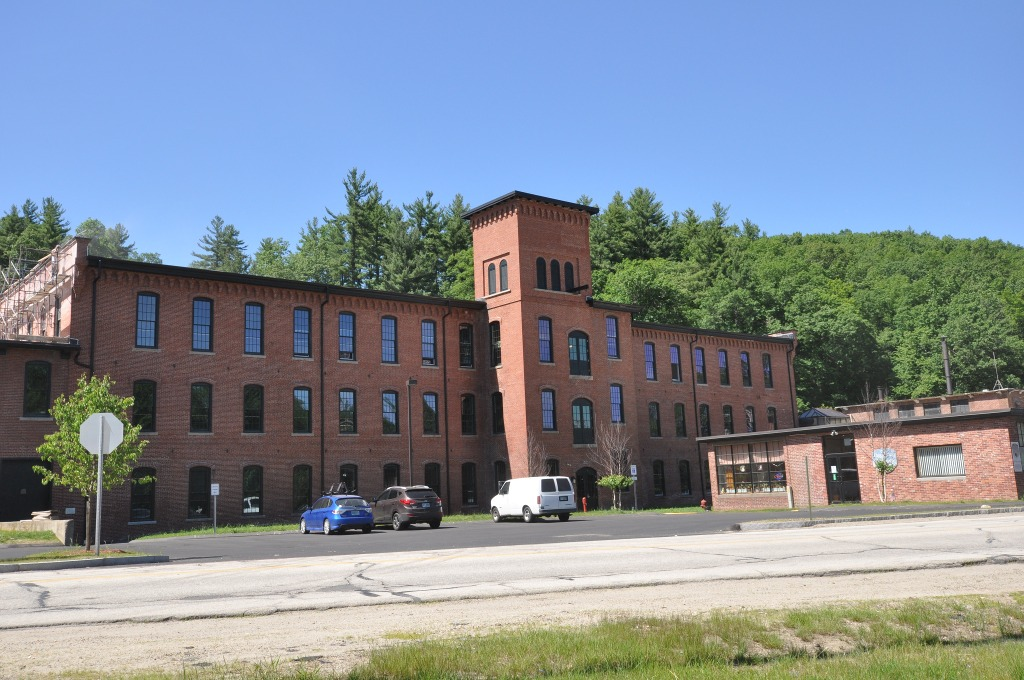

- Location within New Hampshire Location within the United States
- Location: 37 Wilton Road, Milford, New Hampshire
- Coordinates: 42°50′28″N 71°43′18″W
- Area: 13.1 acres (5.3 ha)
- Built: 1866
- NRHP reference No.: 13000383
- Added to NRHP: June 14, 2013

The Hillsborough Mills are a historic textile manufacturing complex at 37 Wilton Road in Western Milford, New Hampshire, near its town line with Wilton. The oldest buildings of the brick mill complex were built in 1866 as a carpet-making operation. This business failed in 1874, but the complex was acquired by other textile interests, and eventual saw success producing carpet yarns, and blankets for horses and bedding. The mills were closed in 1970, and have since been adapted for other uses. The complex was listed on the National Register of Historic Places in 2014.

== Description and history ==
The Hillsborough Mills are located on about 13 acres (5.3 ha) of land, bounded on the south by Wilton Road (New Hampshire Route 101), North River Road, and the Souhegan River. The main building is a long rectangular three-story brick structure, with a projecting four-story tower near the center of its long facade. The building's Italianate character is demonstrated by windows set in segmented-arch openings, bands of brick corbelling in the eave, and round-arch windows in the top floor of the tower. Smaller one and two-story brick additions were made to this building's east end in the early 20th century. The building was historically powered by water delivered through a canal from a dam located in Wilton; the canal has been filled over, its function now replaced by an underground penstock that powers a hydroelectric facility in the mill basement. The dam was rebuilt in 1986.

The main mill was built in 1866 by the Pine Valley Company, and went into operation the same year. Its dam was breached by flooding in 1869 but rebuilt. The company did not do well financially, and failed in 1874. Its assets were acquired by the Hillsborough Mills Company. That company manufactured carpet wool and blankets, employing about 200 people, and survived until 1901, when it was closed due to increasing competition from higher-volume manufacturers elsewhere. The mill was purchased by a new group of investors, among them William Abbott. Abbott would ultimately run three different industrial operations in the Wilton-Milford area, and was a major economic force in the region, employing nearly 500 workers. The Abbotts closed the mill in 1970, and sold the building in 1979. It has since been adapted for multiple light industrial uses.

== See also ==
- National Register of Historic Places listings in Hillsborough County, New Hampshire
