= Killicut-Way House =

Historic house in New Hampshire, United States

- U.S. National Register of Historic Places
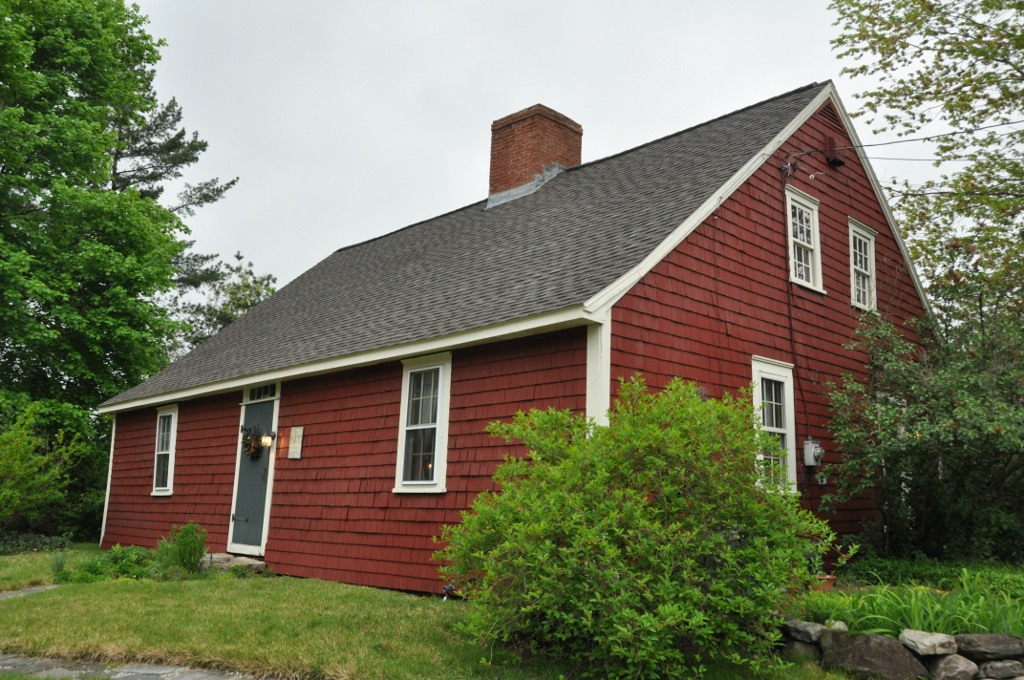

- Location within New Hampshire Location within the United States
- Location: 2 Old House Ln., Nashua, New Hampshire
- Coordinates: 42°43′55″N 71°28′15″W
- Area: less than one acre
- Built: 1740
- NRHP reference No.: 89002056
- Added to NRHP: December 1, 1989

The Killicut-Way House is a historic house at 2 Old House Lane (a stub roadway containing just this house at the end of Tempo Drive) in Nashua, New Hampshire. Estimated to have been built c. 1740, this 1 1/2-story Cape style house is one of the oldest buildings in Nashua, and one of a small number of houses from that period in the region that is relatively unaltered. The house was listed on the National Register of Historic Places in 1989.

== Description and history ==
The Killicut-Way House is located in a residential subdivision south of the Everett Turnpike and east of East Dunstable Road in southern Nashua, at the very end of Tempo Drive. (Old House Lane appears to be a truncated roadway that formerly ran perpendicular to Tempo Drive.) The house is 1 1/2 stories in height, with a timber frame, gabled roof, central chimney, and shingled exterior. The wooden shingles cover what appears to be the house's original exterior siding, variable width wooden planking. The main entrance is at the center of its three-bay facade, with an original vertical board door fastened by iron hinges. A four-light transom window separates the doorway from the eave. Windows are sash, set close to the eave on the front and back. The interior follows a typical central chimney plan, with a narrow entry vestibule, parlor spaces to either side of the chimney, and a long kitchen space behind it. Some of the rooms still have original wide floor boards, and the southwest parlor retains original carved paneling.

The house's exact construction date is not known. Long thought to have been built in the late 17th century or around 1700, its construction methods suggest a later date. If it was built by Killicut, it must date to no earlier than the 1740s, when Thomas Killicut, the first of the family to settle here, arrived. Killicut served in the French and Indian War as one of Rogers' Rangers, and also in the American Revolutionary War. The house remained in the hands of Killicut descendants into the 20th century. It is one of two 18th-century houses in Nashua.

== See also ==
- National Register of Historic Places listings in Hillsborough County, New Hampshire
