= Hollis Village Historic District =

Historic district in New Hampshire, United States

- U.S. National Register of Historic Places
- U.S. Historic district
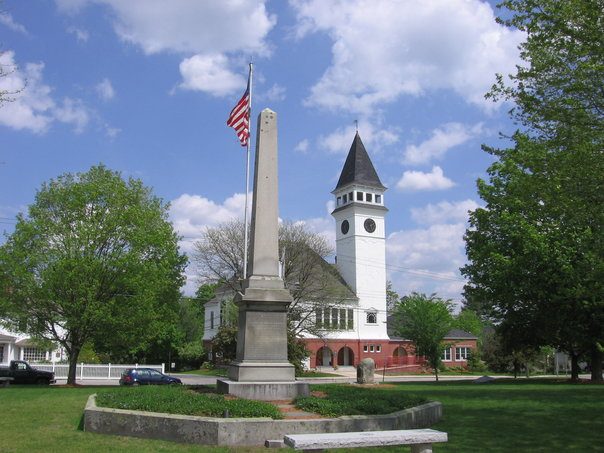

- Location within New Hampshire Location within the United States
- Location: Roughly parts of Ash St., Broad St., Cleasby Ln., Depot Rd., Main St., Monument Sq. and Silver Lake Rd., Hollis, New Hampshire
- Coordinates: 42°44′17″N 71°35′5″W
- Area: 400 acres (160 ha)
- Architect: William M. Butterfield
- Architectural style: Georgian, Federal
- NRHP reference No.: 01000204
- Added to NRHP: March 2, 2001

The Hollis Village Historic District encompasses the historic village center of Hollis, New Hampshire. The district is centered on Monument Square, which connects Main Street (New Hampshire Route 122) to Depot Street and Broad Street. It covers about 400 acres (160 ha), and extends along all three of those roads for some distance, and includes properties on Silver Lake Road and Ash Street. Most of the buildings in the district are residential or agricultural in use, and date before the turn of the 20th century; the oldest buildings date to the mid-18th century. The "Always Ready Engine House", which occupies a triangular parcel at the western end of Monument Square, was built in 1859, and is the town's oldest municipal building. Its most architecturally sophisticated building is the town hall, built in 1887 to a design by William M. Butterfield of Manchester. The district represents the growth of a mainly agricultural community over a 200-year period. The district was listed on the National Register of Historic Places in 2001.

The area that is now Hollis was originally part of Dunstable, Massachusetts, and was incorporated in 1740 as "West Dunstable"; it was renamed "Holles" in 1746 by New Hampshire's colonial governor Benning Wentworth. It was first settled in 1730 by Peter Powers, who built a house (no longer standing) near 8 Silver Lake Road in the district. The civic portions of the district, including Monument Square, the cemetery, and the site of the first meeting house, were given to the town by Abraham Taylor in 1740, and the Congregational society was organized in 1743. The town reached its pre-20th century population peak about 1800, after which it saw a steady exodus of farmers to better lands in the Old Northwest. In the late 19th century a small number of summer estates were built in the town, but it remained largely agricultural into the late 20th century, when it began to acquire a more suburban character.

== See also ==
- National Register of Historic Places listings in Hillsborough County, New Hampshire
