= Mine Falls Gatehouse =

- U.S. Historic district – Contributing property
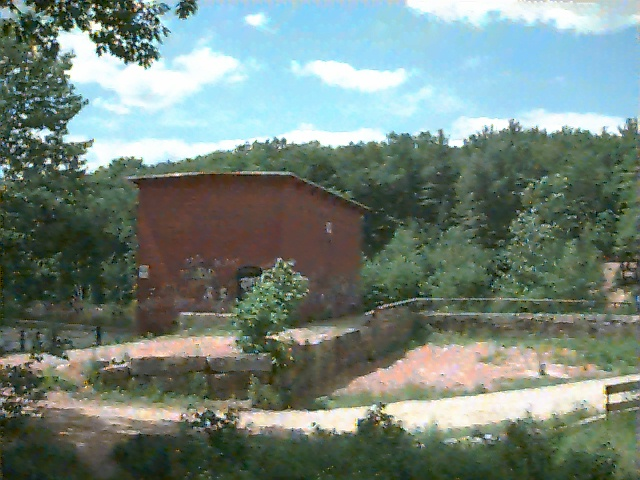
- The gatehouse in 2001

- Location within New Hampshire Location within the United States
- Location: Nashua, New Hampshire
- Coordinates: 42°45′1.5″N 71°30′17.5″W
- Built: 1886
- Part of: Nashua Manufacturing Company Historic District (ID87001460)
- Designated CP: September 11, 1987

The Mine Falls Gatehouse is a dam gatehouse in Mine Falls Park in Nashua, New Hampshire. It was built in 1886 by the Nashua Manufacturing Company to regulate water flow from the mill yard. The company relied on water flow to provide power to its mill. In 1987 the gatehouse was included in the Nashua Manufacturing Company Historic District and listed on the National Register of Historic Places as a contributing property.

== Origin ==
The Nashua Manufacturing Company received a charter in the 1820s to make cloth and to trade near the Nashua River. Three miles from where the company's mills were being built, a dam was constructed at Mine Falls. A power canal was hand-dug under the supervision of James Baldwin. His idea was to change the course of the water from the river, through the guard gates, and into the canal. By the time the water reached the mills, it had enough velocity to turn the waterwheels under the building.

The gatehouse was constructed in 1886 during the presidency of Grover Cleveland. At the time it was a state-of-the-art improvement over the smaller gates that once occupied the canal. A Lowell, Massachusetts contractor, L.F. Kittrege, hired men to build five new lift gates that would be protected by the brick walls of the gatehouse.

The gatehouse, along with the dam and canal, is a part of the Nashua Manufacturing Company Historic District; they are listed in the National Register of Historic Places. The gatehouse was built for practicality, not architectural refinement. Its interior contains machinery that reflects the transition from hydropower to electric power.

== Decline ==
During the Great Depression of the 1930s, construction of new commercial buildings came to a stop as the economy declined. With changing manufacturing practices, many textile companies in New England closed or relocated to the South, where non-union workers could be hired for less money. Nashua Manufacturing Company did not move and finally closed in 1948.
