= Nashua Gummed and Coated Paper Company Historic District =

Historic district in New Hampshire, United States

- U.S. National Register of Historic Places
- U.S. Historic district
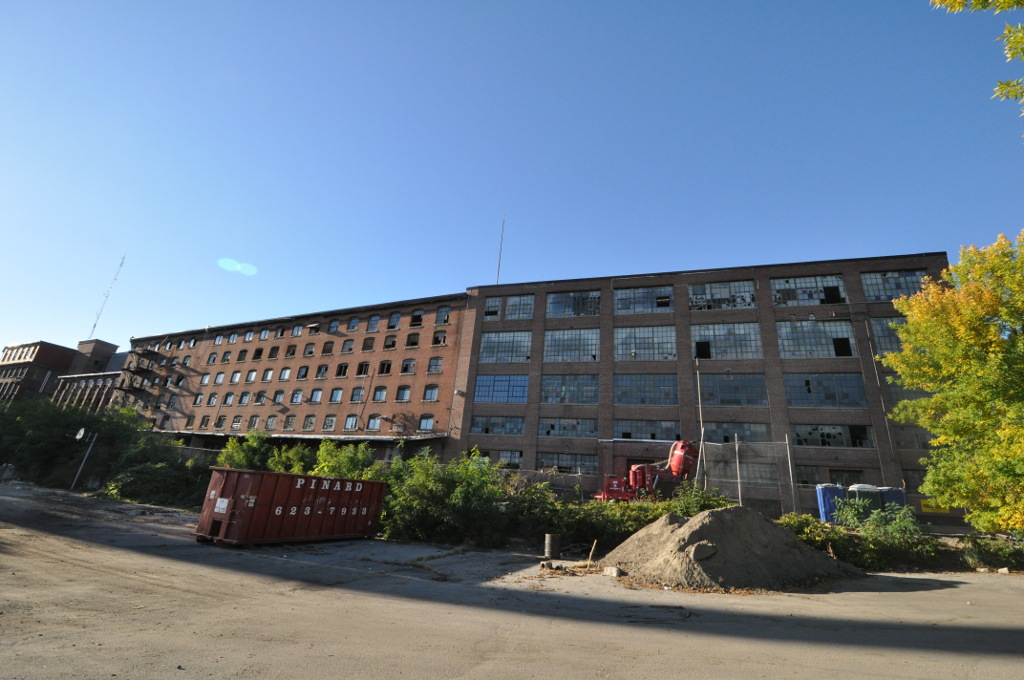

- Location within New Hampshire Location within the United States
- Location: 34, 44, 55 Franklin & 21, 25 30 Front Sts., Nashua, New Hampshire
- Coordinates: 42°45′46″N 71°28′13″W
- Area: 9 acres (3.6 ha)
- Architectural style: Romanesque; Post World War I Industrial
- NRHP reference No.: 15000919
- Added to NRHP: December 22, 2015

The Nashua Gummed and Coated Paper Company Historic District encompasses a collection of former industrial buildings on the north side of the Nashua River in Nashua, New Hampshire. Located on Franklin and Front Streets west of Main Street, the complex was developed by the Nashua Gummed and Coated Paper Company, later the Nashua Corporation, beginning in the late 19th century. It was a major manufacturing and employment center for the city until mid-1990s, when the company's business declined. One of its former storehouses was converted to residences in the 2000s, and the main complex is, in 2015-16, undergoing the same process. The complex of surviving buildings was listed on the National Register of Historic Places in 2015.

== Description and history ==
The Nashua Gummed and Coated Paper Company complex is located on the northwest side of downtown Nashua, on the north side of the Nashua River opposite the former Nashua Manufacturing Company plant. It is sandwiched between Front Street and a bend in the river, which is roughly paralleled by Front Street. The complex has six buildings, of which the main one is a large Romanesque four-story brick building with a 550-foot (170 m) facade on Front Street. Its core section was built in 1889 as a three-story structure, and it underwent a series of enlargements between then and 1940. A second major mill building is located just to its southwest, with a much more utilitarian appearance.

The Nashua Gummed and Coated Paper Company had its origins in a small company founded by three men in 1849 intending to manufacture playing cards for gold miners. The company instead made cardboard and glazed paper products, and operated under a variety of names in Nashua until 1889 when it was incorporated as the Nashua Card and Glazed Paper Company. It was by the 1870s the largest non-textile manufacturer in the city. Under the leadership of Harry Bixby, a local investor, the main plant was built to a design by W.B. Page of Clinton, Massachusetts. The firm was heavily in debt by the early 20th century, and was acquired in 1904 by the Carter Rice Company of Boston, Massachusetts, which established the Nashua Gummed & Coated Paper Company as a subsidiary to manage this and other assets related to coated paper products. Over the 20th century the company expanded its products and operations, but contracted in the 1990s, eventually closing its presence in Nashua in 2005.

== See also ==
- Nashville Historic District (Nashua, New Hampshire), east of this district
- Nashua Manufacturing Company Historic District, across the Nashua River to the south
- National Register of Historic Places listings in Hillsborough County, New Hampshire
