= Hunt Library =

Hunt Library may refer to:

- James B. Hunt Jr. Library at North Carolina State University
- Hunt Memorial Library in Nashua, New Hampshire
- William Morris Hunt Memorial Library, a library at the Museum of Fine Arts, Boston
- Hunt Library, a library at Carnegie Mellon University
