= Triangle Credit Union =

- Type: Credit union
- Industry: Financial services
- Founded: 1939
- Headquarters: Nashua, New Hampshire; United States
- Products: Savings; checking; consumer loans; mortgages; credit cards; online banking
- Total assets: $600 Million USD (2016)
- Website: trianglecu.org

Triangle Credit Union is a credit union headquartered in Nashua, New Hampshire. It was incorporated on September 16, 1939 for the employees of Nashua Gummed and Coated Paper Company, now known as Nashua Corporation. The purpose of organizing the credit union was to allow both office and mill employees the opportunity to save money and obtain small loans at rates substantially lower than the banks or other savings and loan institutions. When the credit union opened for business, the office was located directly above the Traffic Department of Nashua Corporation on Franklin Street in Nashua.

The credit union continued to flourish with steady increases in assets and membership. As World War II escalated, the credit union experienced little growth, since buying war bonds became predominant. However, as the national economy grew, more and more people found a need to save for the future. The credit union showed visible signs of growth during 1944-45. As the veterans returned from World War II to Nashua Corporation in 1946, the board of directors voted to waive interest on all military loans. This meant that interest on loans procured by veterans before the war, from the time they entered the armed forces until they were released, would not have to be paid. At the 21st Annual Meeting in January 1960, the board of directors became affiliated with the New Hampshire Credit Union League.

In November 1960, the board adopted the policy of “Once a Member, Always a Member” with no limitations.

Between the years 1967 and 1969, the credit union experienced tremendous financial and membership growth. This sudden surge prompted the board of directors to seek new quarters. On November 11, 1967, TFCU purchased the land and tenement house at 31-33 Franklin Street. The credit union erected a new one-story brick office building with adjoining parking lot, which was dedicated in September 1968. As part of the celebration, the credit union honored original officers and charter members. The bylaws were amended in 1968 to include members of the immediate families and employees of other Nashua Corporation facilities outside the state of New Hampshire.

In November 1996, Triangle Federal Credit Union applied for a state charter. TFCU held the distinction of being the first federal credit union to change its charter as a result of the court action taken by the American Bankers Association against federal credit unions. A motion was made and seconded by the board of directors, sanctioned by the membership, to change from Triangle Federal Credit Union to Triangle Credit Union.

The State of New Hampshire Banking Department awarded Triangle Credit Union with a state chartered community credit union status on January 1, 1997. The credit union's field of membership extends to any individual residing within a 25-mile radius of any of TCU branch.

In September 2003, Triangle Credit Union opened its first in-store branch and was the third financial institution to do so in a BJ's Wholesale Club.

== List Of Branches ==
=== Amherst ===
138 Route 101A
Amherst, NH 03031

=== Derry ===
3 Windham Rd
Derry, NH 03038

=== Manchester ===
1030 Candia Road
Manchester, NH 03109

257 Elm Street
Manchester, NH 03101

Elliot Hospital
1 Elliot Way
Manchester, NH 03103

=== Merrimack ===
362 DW Highway
Merrimack, NH 03054

=== Nashua ===
166 DW Highway
Nashua, NH 03060

33 Franklin Street
Nashua, NH 03064

St. Joseph Hospital
172 Kinsley St.
Nashua, NH 03060
