= Jim Mahoney (politician) =

American politician

Member-elect of the New Hampshire House of Representatives from the Hillsborough 7th district
- Assuming office December 2026
- Succeeding: Alicia Gregg

Personal details
- Party: Democratic

Jim Mahoney is an American politician. A member of the Democratic Party, he is the member-elect for the Hillsborough 7th district of the New Hampshire House of Representatives.
