= Abbot House (Nashua, New Hampshire) =

Historic house in New Hampshire, United States

- U.S. National Register of Historic Places
- U.S. Historic district – Contributing property
- NH State Register of Historic Places
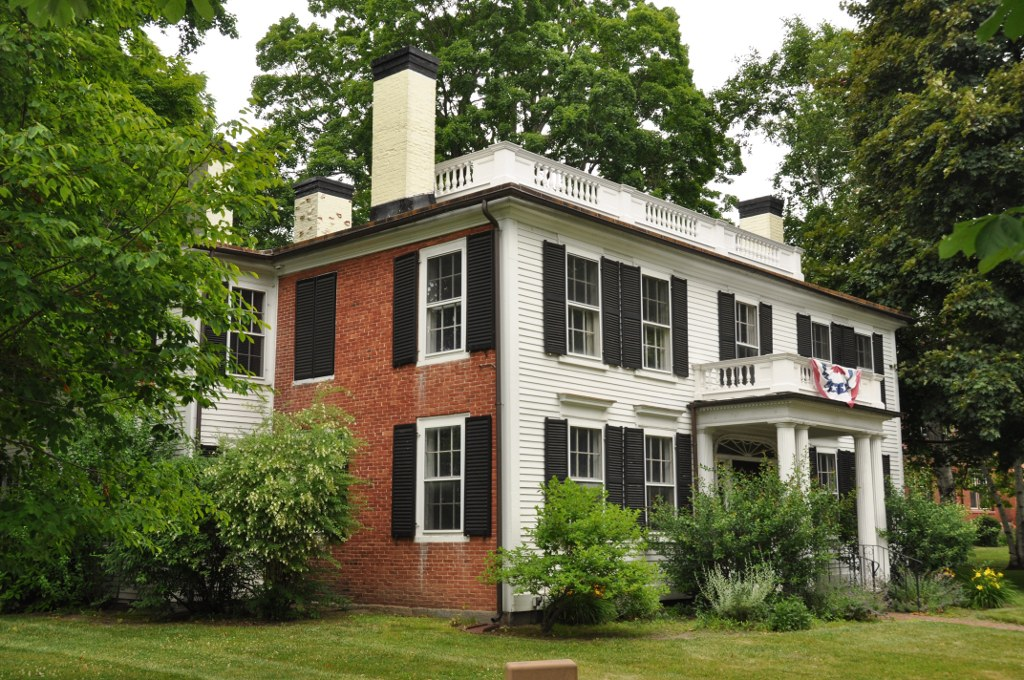

- Location within New Hampshire Location within the United States
- Location: 1 Abbott Sq., Nashua, New Hampshire
- Coordinates: 42°45′57″N 71°28′8″W
- Area: less than one acre
- Built: 1804
- Architectural style: Greek Revival, Federal
- Part of: Nashville Historic District (ID84000574)
- NRHP reference No.: 80000289

Significant dates
- Added to NRHP: April 17, 1980
- Designated CP: December 13, 1984
- Designated NHSRHP: April 29, 2002

The Abbot House, also known as the Abbot-Spalding House, is a historic house museum at One Abbot Square in Nashua, New Hampshire. Built in 1804, it is one of the area's most prominent examples of Federal period architecture, albeit with substantial early 20th-century Colonial Revival alterations. The house was listed on the National Register of Historic Places in 1980, and the New Hampshire State Register of Historic Places in 2002. It is now owned by the Nashua Historical Society, which operates it as a museum; it is open by appointment.

== Description and history ==
Abbot Square is a triangular green just north of downtown Nashua, bounded by Amherst Street, Concord Street, and Nashville Street. The Abbot House stands on the north side of Nashville Street, facing south. It is a two-story wood-frame house with brick side walls, a locally rare feature. It is covered by a truncated hip roof, with a low balustrade around the outer edge. The front facade is five bays wide, with windows symmetrically placed around a slightly wider central bay. The main entrance is in the center, sheltered by a rectangular portico supported by four large fluted columns and topped by a balustrade.

The house was built in 1804 for Daniel Abbot, a prominent local resident. It was owned 1854–1892 by George Perham, under whose ownership the exterior was given an extensive Victorian treatment, which included a three-story tower in the central bay. Purchased in 1905 by William Spaulding, he removed most of the Victorian alterations, while adding Colonial Revival features, including the present portico. The house was given to the Nashua Historical Society by his descendants.

== See also ==
- National Register of Historic Places listings in Hillsborough County, New Hampshire
- New Hampshire Historical Marker No. 267: Abbot-Spalding House
