= Nashua Corporation =

American company

- Logo of the Nashua Corporation
- Traded as: Nasdaq: NHSA
- Industry: Manufacturing
- Predecessor: Nashua Card and Glazed Paper Company and Carter, Rice & Company
- Founded: 1849 in Nashua, New Hampshire, United States
- Headquarters: Nashua, New Hampshire, Nashua, USA

The Nashua Corporation (NASDAQ: NSHA) was an American company headquartered in Nashua, New Hampshire that made labels, specialty papers, magnetic media and imaging products and services. On September 15, 2009, it was bought by Cenveo, Inc. As of early 2010, it had four factories in several states. In April 2019, the long-run label and receipt paper businesses were sold by Cenveo to Iconex after Cenveo filed for Chapter 11 bankruptcy in 2018.

== History ==
Nashua began as a gummed paper manufacturer in Rockport, Massachusetts. In 1898 the company went defunct. The owner, Charles H. Crowell, was an inventor and entrepreneur. He sold his failing company to Carter, Rice & Company of Boston, who retained Crowell as manager of their new division, renamed Winthrop Manufacturing Company. A fire destroyed the factory in February, 1904, which had moved to south Boston. The search for a new location led the owners to Nashua, New Hampshire, where they found the heavily indebted Nashua Card and Glazed Paper Company, which had been founded in 1849 as a manufacturer of cardboard and glazed paper. During the California Gold Rush Nashua made playing cards for miners and became known as a result as the Card Shop. This name remained with the company for nearly 100 years. The owners of Nashua sold their factory to Carter and Rice for $74,000, plus mortgage. Thus, in 1904, the Nashua Corporation was founded. In April, 1904 the wholly owned subsidiary was incorporated. It became known as the Nashua Card, Gummed and Coated Paper Company. The new company combined the capabilities of both companies, continuing to manufacture the products of Carter, Rice & Company: gummed flats, gummed paper and sock linings. They added the products of the previous company, glazed paper, cardboard and "surface coated" paper.

In 1910 the company had its first telephone installed along with new office machinery and boilers. That year the company also retained its first chemist, adding research and development to the business model.

In 1926 it bought the Knowles Youngblood Co.

Much of the city of Nashua worked at the mill in the 1930s through the 1960s.

Doehla Greeting Card company moved into the plant (date unknown) bringing in women workers which had not previously worked at a paper-producing plant. Napkins began being processed at the Nashua plant in the 1960s or 1970s. A women designer came in as a consultant, and brought many more designs to the plant. This reflected an evolution of the company from paper milling to design and print work. New machines came in that could print on cloth and other materials. (PNL/rd) There were five designers on staff in the 1950s and 1960s. Mainly focused on bubble gum wrappers (3 of the 5 staff designers), the Hershey’s 5 cent candy bars kept the company in business.

In The 1980s the Computer Products Division made Magnetic Media.

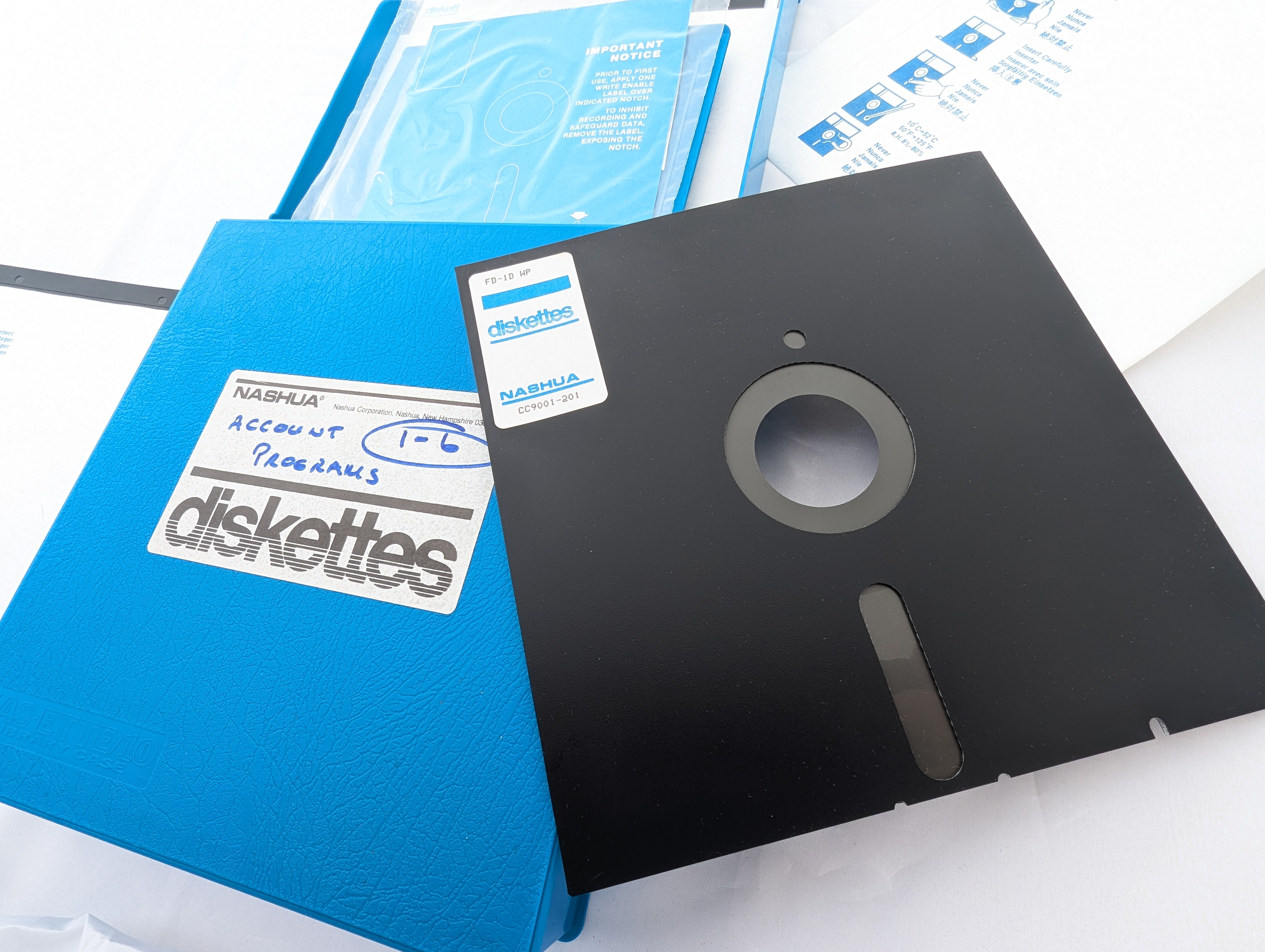
8 Inch Floppy Disk made by Nashua in 1984

In 2000 it merged with Rittenhouse, another printing specialty firm.

Nashua Corporation sold its line of tape products to Tyco International in 1997. The tape products line was then divested as part of Covalence Specialty Materials which later merged with Berry Plastics. Nashua Brand Tape Products are now manufactured in Franklin, Kentucky.

== Popular culture ==
Nashua Tape Products' 357 brand duct tape is used by MythBusters duo Adam Savage and Jamie Hyneman for their projects. Nashua Tape's 357 was featured in four MythBusters episodes including Duct Tape Hour (Season 7, Episode 13), Duct Tape Hour 2 (Season 8, Episode 7), Duct Tape Plane (Season 9, Episode 16), and most recently Duct Tape Island (Season 10, Episode 1).

Nashua Corporation was featured in the 1980 NBC White Paper episode If Japan Can... Why Can't We?

== See also ==
- Nashua Gummed and Coated Paper Company Historic District
- Triangle Credit Union
