= Nashua Manufacturing Company =

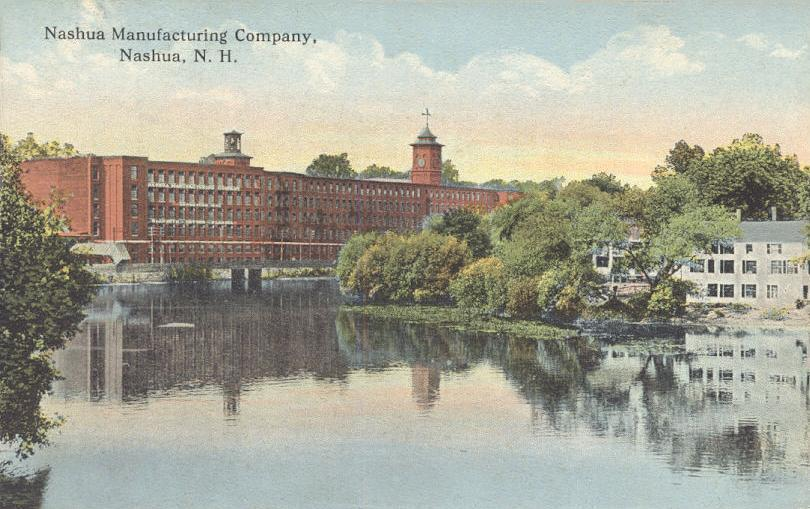
Nashua Manufacturing Company and the Nashua River in 1909, still in its heyday.

The Nashua Manufacturing Company was a cotton textile manufacturer in Nashua, New Hampshire, that operated from 1823 to 1945. It was one of several textile companies that helped create what became the city of Nashua, creating roads, churches and its own bank as part of the process. Like most New England textile mills it struggled during the Depression. It shut in 1947, when much of the industry had moved South for cheaper labor and land.

== History ==
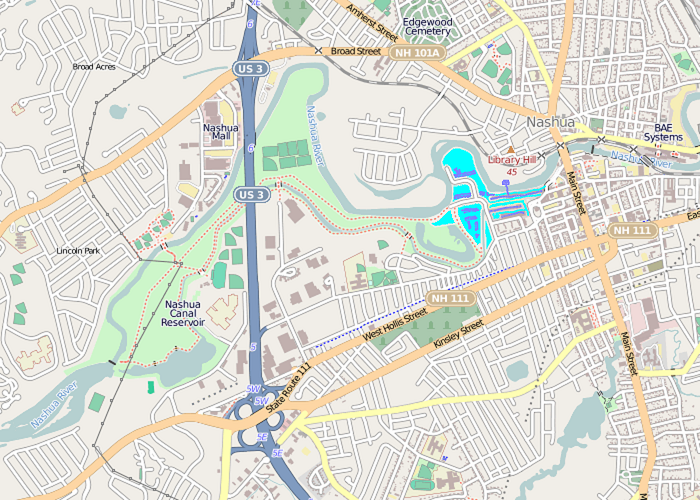
Map of Mine Falls Park in green with the Nashua Manufacturing Company Historic District east of that in light blue.

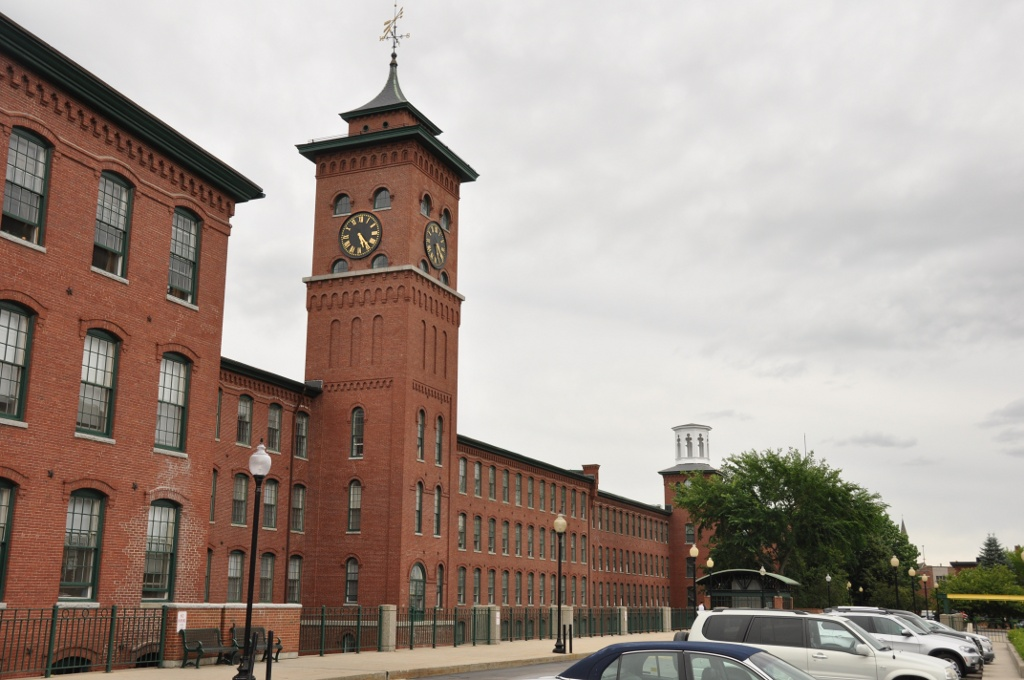
Part of the company's original mill complex, now Clocktower Place

Nashua was one of several towns that was established along the Merrimack River to take advantage of water power in the early days of the Industrial Revolution. The most notable mills were the Merrimack mills (founded 1823) in Lowell, Massachusetts, and the Amoskeag mills (founded 1810) at Manchester, New Hampshire, where the Millyard Museum is located.

The Nashua Manufacturing Company was incorporated in 1823 on the initiative of Daniel Abbot. Abbot is considered the "father of Nashua", and he was part of the town when it was renamed from Dunstable, New Hampshire, to Nashua in 1837. He and other citizens began the company after buying up land from the banks of the Merrimack along the Nashua River up to Mine Falls, as they planned to use the falls to power their mills. They hired Asher Benjamin to design the mills, including churches and a grid of streets. The company helped fund the digging of the Nashua power canal. After the canal was complete, the company built more mill buildings and hired more labor, likely helping the town's population rise from 1,142 to 2,417 in the years 1820-1830.

In 1835, one of the founders of the company also founded the Nashua Bank, later known as the Indian Head Bank, which used its own currency. The Nashua Manufacturing Company was larger than other mills built during this time and during the 19th and early 20th centuries, bought several other textile manufacturers, including Jackson Company, Indian Head Mills, and Tremont and Suffolk Mills. The company owned the largest contiguous portion of these properties encompassing 400 acres and is now protected as Mine Falls Park and the Nashua Manufacturing Company Historic District.

It was acquired by Textron Inc. in 1945. In 1947, Textron liquidated the mill, throwing some 2,000 people out of work when the city had a population of about 25,000.

Six of the mill buildings along the Nashua River were converted into apartments in the early 2000s and are now known as Clocktower Place Apartments.

== Archives and records ==
- Nashua Manufacturing Company records at Baker Library Special Collections, Harvard Business School.
