= Mine Falls Park =

Park in Nashua, New Hampshire, United States

Coordinates: 42°45′02″N 71°30′15″W

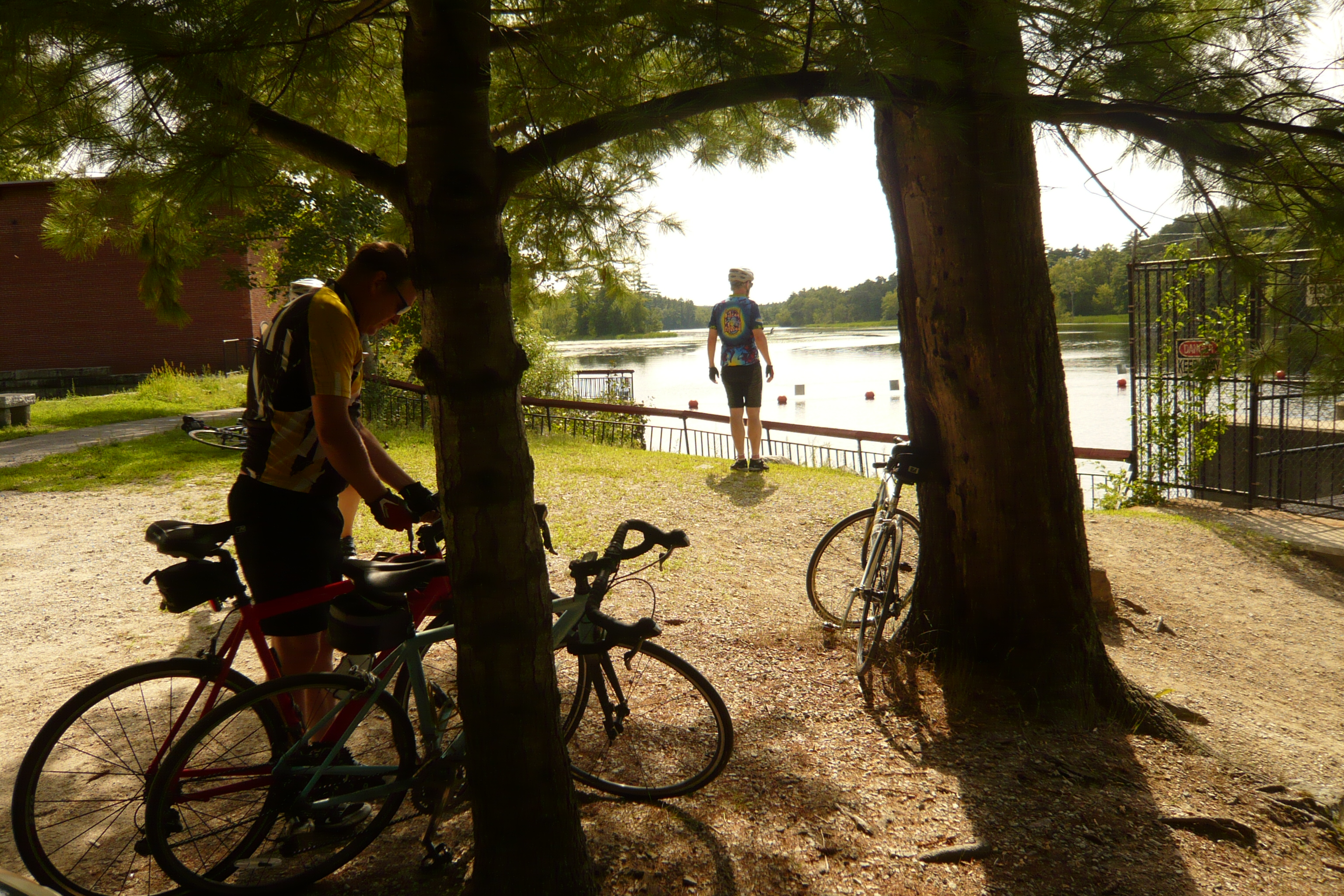
Cyclists take a break at the 1886 Mine Falls Gatehouse in Mine Falls Park.

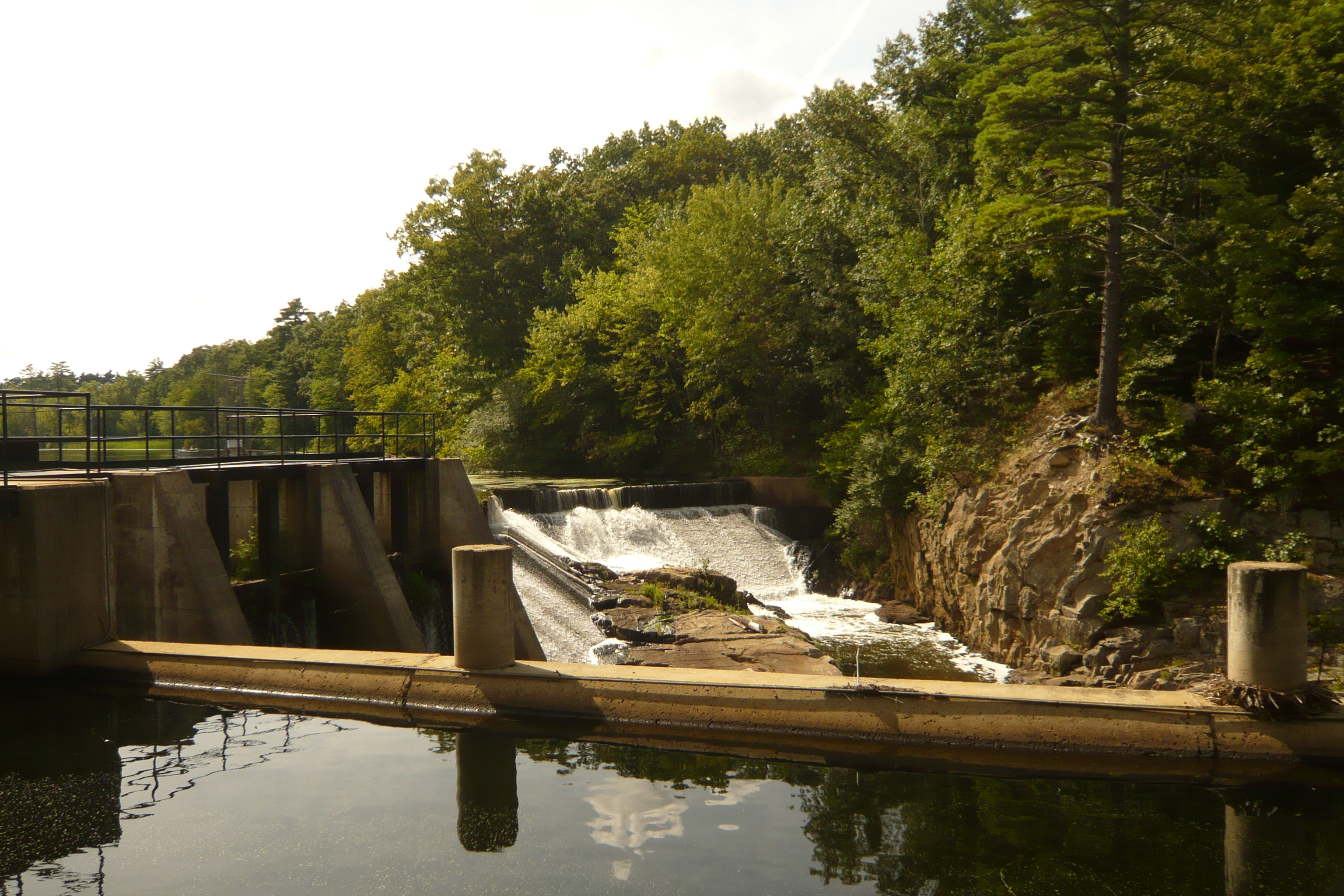
Mine Falls dam next to the Mine Falls Gatehouse

Mine Falls Park is a 325-acre (132 ha) park in the city of Nashua, New Hampshire, United States. Located in the heart of the city, it was purchased in 1969 from the Nashua, New Hampshire Foundation with city and federal Land and Water Conservation Fund (LWCF) money. It is bordered on the north by the Nashua River and on the south by the millpond and power canal system.

== History ==
The park encompasses 325 acres (132 ha) on both sides of the Everett Turnpike. The name "Mine Falls" dates from the 18th century, when low-quality lead was supposedly mined from the islands below the falls. In the early 19th century, the potential of the Nashua River to drive the wheels of industrial mills was recognized after the success of the Merrimack Canal, dug in the 1820s in Lowell, Massachusetts, 10 miles (16 km) downstream from Nashua.

The first gates were built in 1826, and the gatehouse near Mine falls was built in 1886. The property was once owned by the Nashua Manufacturing Company, which harnessed the river's flow for power in its mills. The mills closed in 1948 and the owner Textron sold it to the Nashua New Hampshire Foundation. After that, the area was used for various commercial purposes, while the river suffered from severe pollution. A 1973 visit from the Environmental Protection Agency's Program to Photographically Document Subjects of Environmental Concern (DOCUMERICA) led to the creation of the Mine Falls Park master plan in 1974. In 1981, a regulation-sized soccer playing field was added to the park.

In 1981, a new footbridge over the Nashua River canal was built at the end of Whipple Street, allowing additional access to the playing field area. The playing area was later expanded to include additional fields for soccer. The trails provide a highway underpass and a bicycle and pedestrian path to cross the Nashua River.

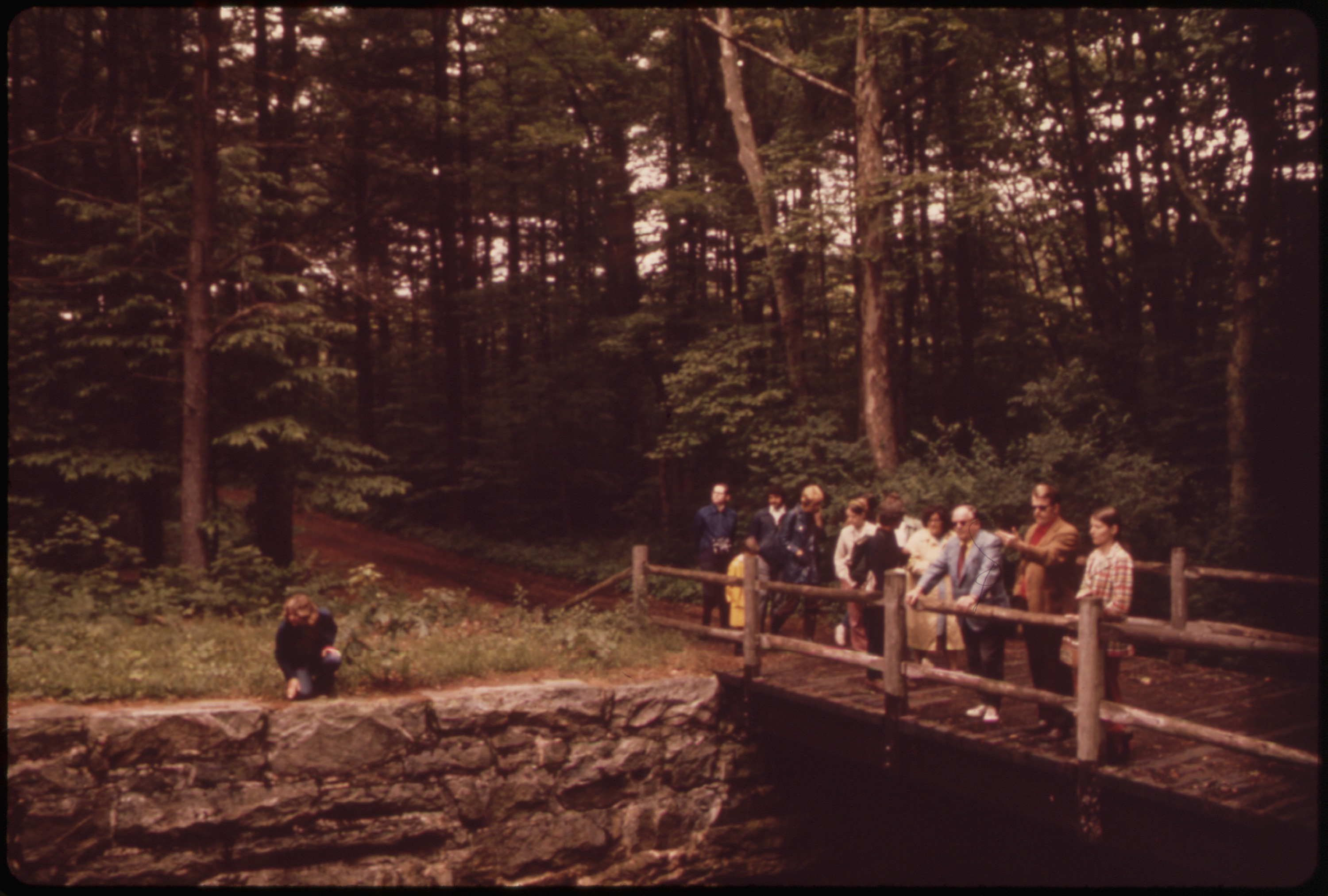
Inspectors from DOCUMERICA looking at the granite walls of the Nashua River power canal in June 1973

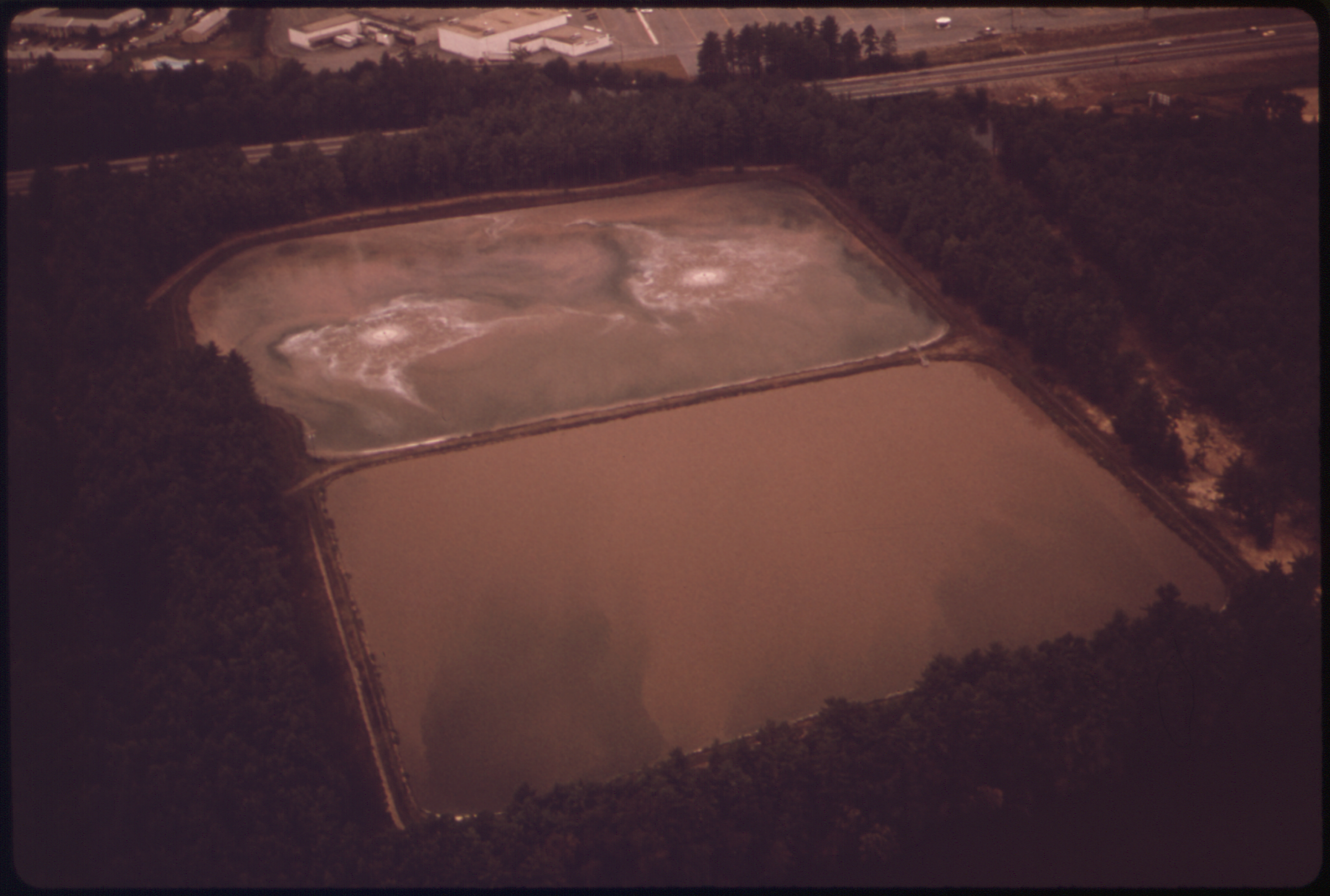
The former sewage lagoons in 1973, that today are the location of the Soifert Memorial playing fields.

In 1987, the Nashua River Canal and the Nashua Manufacturing Company Historic District (the Millyard) were placed on the National Register of Historic Places. In 1992, the park trails were designated part of the New Hampshire Heritage Trail system, which extends 130 miles (210 km) along the Merrimack River from Massachusetts to Canada. In 1986, Mine Falls was commissioned to be the site of a small, city-owned hydroelectric dam with a capacity of three megawatts.

City officials had allowed an encampment of the homeless, known as "Maple Island", in the park. An attack on a homeless man in 2009 prompted renewed concern about it, and officials cleared the settlement. Some local homeless made a new camp on nearby private land.

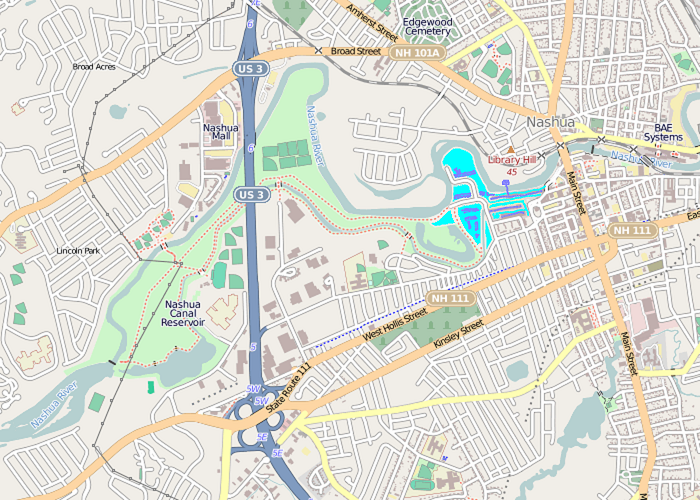
Map of the park in light green with the playing fields shown in dark green and the Nashua Manufacturing Company Historic District in blue.

== See also ==
- 1886 Mine Falls Gatehouse
