= Nashua Manufacturing Company Historic District =

Historic district in New Hampshire, United States

- U.S. National Register of Historic Places
- U.S. Historic district
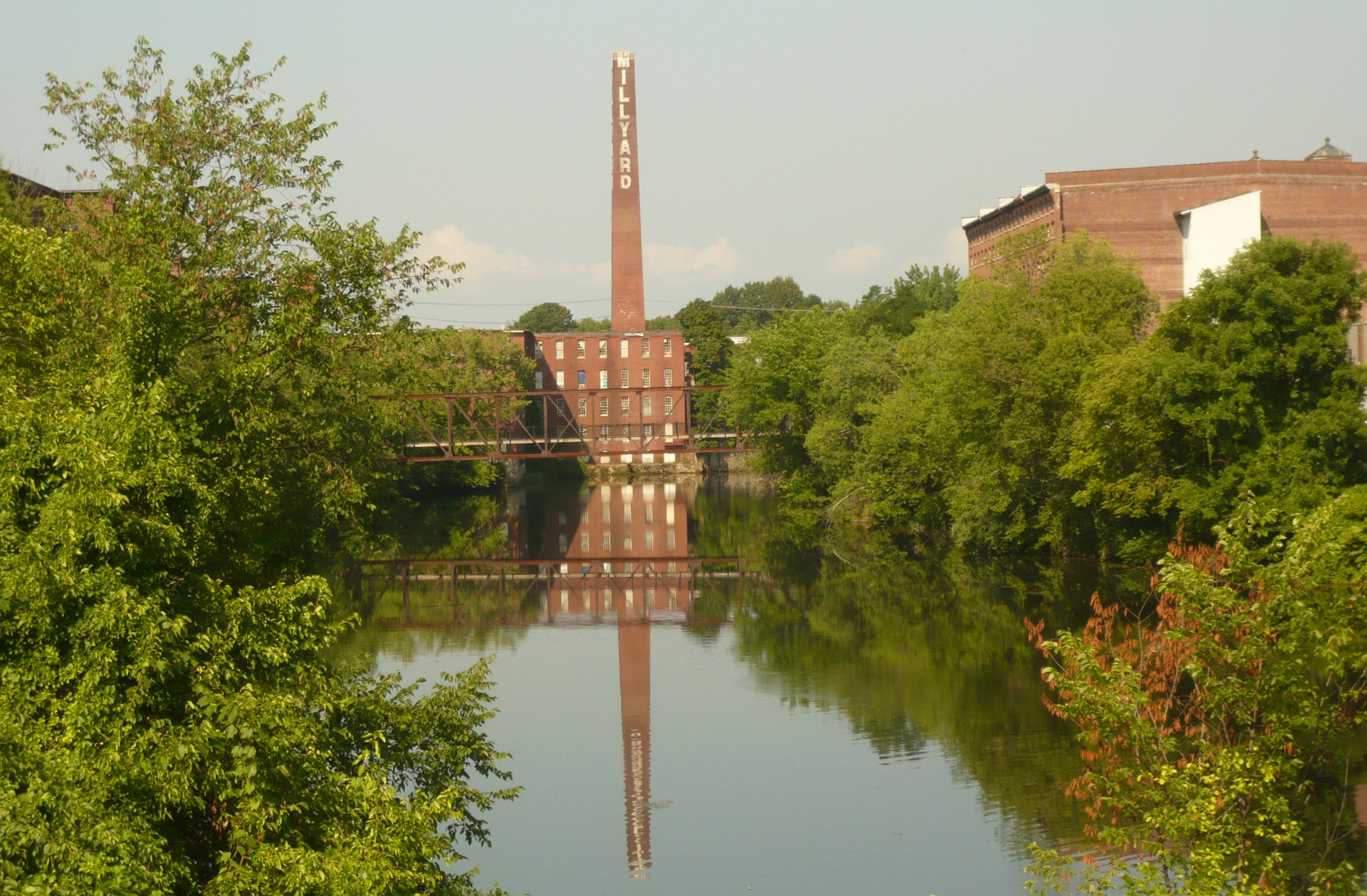
- Nashua Millyard with Truss bridge to North cotton storehouse (right)

- Location within New Hampshire Location within the United States
- Location: Located along the Nashua River, bordered by Mine Falls Park, Factory, Pine and Main streets, Nashua, New Hampshire
- Coordinates: 42.7597°N 71.4728°W
- Area: 61 acres (25 ha)
- Architect: Asher Benjamin
- Architectural style: Late Victorian, Italianate, Federal
- NRHP reference No.: 87001460
- Added to NRHP: September 11, 1987

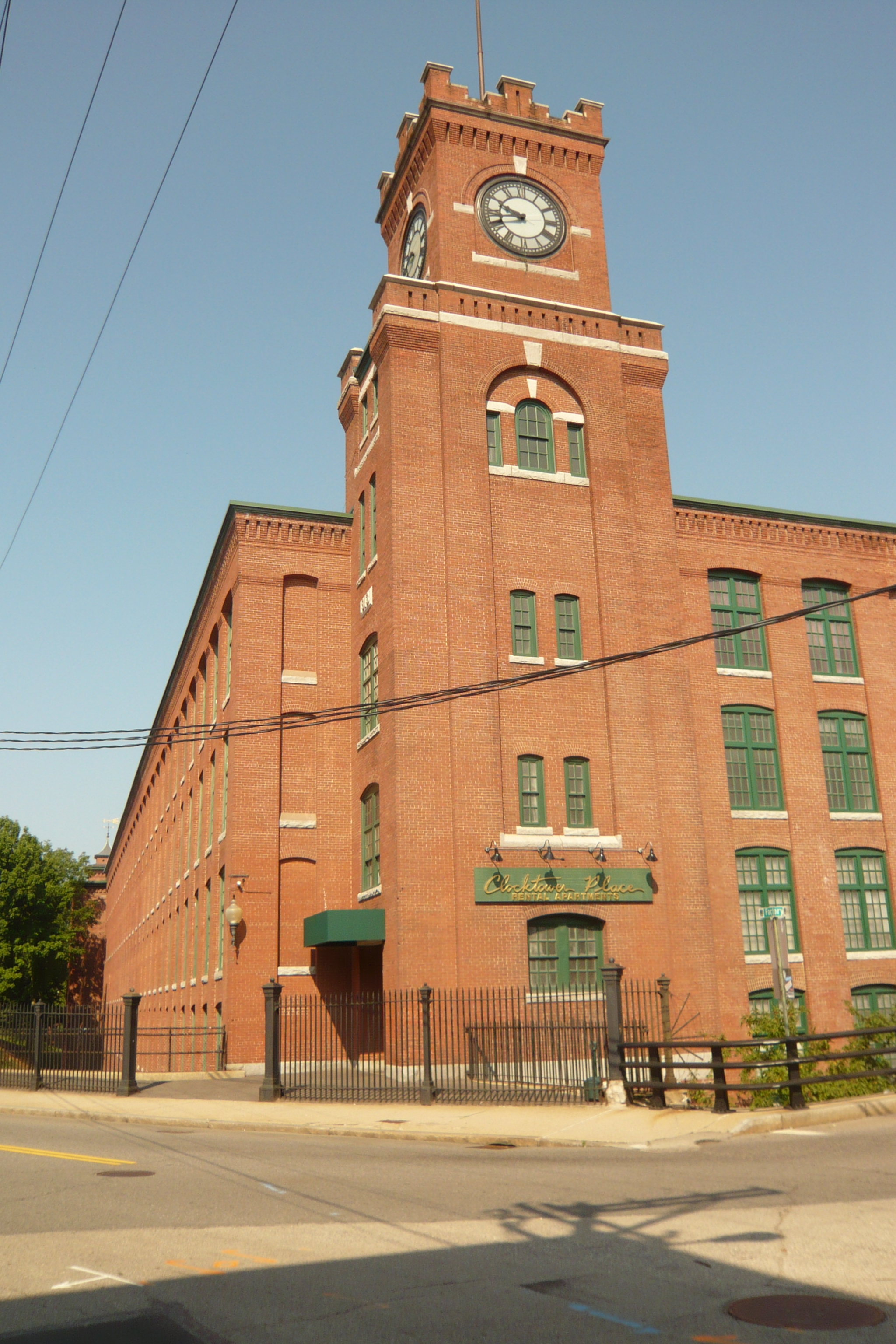
Clock Tower Place, formerly Mill #7 built in 1904 and Clock Tower added in 1913

The Nashua Manufacturing Company Historic District in Nashua, New Hampshire, is a historic district that was listed on the National Register of Historic Places (NRHP) in 1987. It encompasses an area just west of downtown Nashua, roughly located along the southern bank of the Nashua River, bordered on the west side by Mine Falls Park, on the south side by the Nashua River canal, up to Ledge Street, and from the east side by Factory, Pine and Water streets, up to the Main Street bridge.

Today this area is dominated by the clock tower at "Clock Tower Place" apartments, and the large "Millyard" smokestack of the Picker building. The district takes its name from the time when this complex of buildings belonged to the Nashua Manufacturing Company, and though surrounding buildings also served the company in some way or another, they are not included in the district. The Nashua Manufacturing Company was originally built as a cotton mill and was incorporated in 1823. Their competitor, the Jackson Manufacturing Company, located downstream on the other side of the Main Street bridge at Jackson Falls dam, was incorporated in 1824.

== Nashua power canal ==
Though all of Mine Falls Park is not a part of the district, the entirety of the Nashua River Canal is, up to and including the 1886 Mine Falls Gatehouse. This "Upper", or "Power canal" is 3 miles (5 km) long, 6 feet (1.8 m) deep and 60 feet (18 m) wide, and it was dug and in operation by 1830. It contributed significantly to the economic prosperity of the company.

== Historical significance ==
In 1835 the town was the third largest city of New Hampshire after Dover and Portsmouth, and the Nashua Manufacturing Company opened their own bank, called the Nashua Bank. The creation of a new railroad line to Nashua from Lowell, Massachusetts, in 1838 gave the local economy a further boost, and the Nashua Iron Company opened, specializing in locomotive parts for this growing new industry. The Nashua Manufacturing Company built 48 houses or tenements and two churches to be able to hire enough workers to man the machinery in its complex.

== Listed properties ==
- Mill #1 (1856–1857), rebuilt 1826 mill which burned in 1856
- Mill#2 (1867)
- Mill#3 (1835–1836), oldest remaining structure
- Mill#4 (1844–1845)
- Picker building (1866–1881)
- Cotton house (1845–1898)
- Boiler house (with "Millyard tower") (1898)
- North cotton storehouse (c. 1902)
- Bleachery and dyehouse (1892–1919)
- Repair shops and cloth room (1865–1899)
- Power canal (1824–1872)
- Mine Falls Gatehouse (1886)
- Storehouse #2 (1851–1885)
- Storehouse #4 (1890)
- Wastehouse (1896)
- Picker building #6 (1890–1924)
- Mill #6 (1899) and #6 annex (1902)
- Mill #5 (1899) and #5 annex (1900)
- Company office (1879)
- Mill#7 (1904–1913)
- West Auto house (1920s)
- East Auto house (c. 1915)
- Wheel house (1900) with 1902 turbine and generator
- Oil house (1905)
- South cotton storehouse (1916)
- Through-Warren Truss bridge (c. 1902)
- Iron fence (c. 1905)
- Office building (1900)

== Non-contributing elements within the designated area ==
- Nashua NH Foundation office (1941)
- Boiler room (1948)
- Dust collector (1950)
- Power station (1948)
- Pine street extension (1900)
- Parking lot (1926)

== See also ==
- Nashville Historic District (Nashua, New Hampshire), on the north side of the Nashua River
- National Register of Historic Places listings in Hillsborough County, New Hampshire
