= Hunt Memorial Library =

Historic building in New Hampshire, United States

- U.S. National Register of Historic Places
- U.S. Historic district – Contributing property
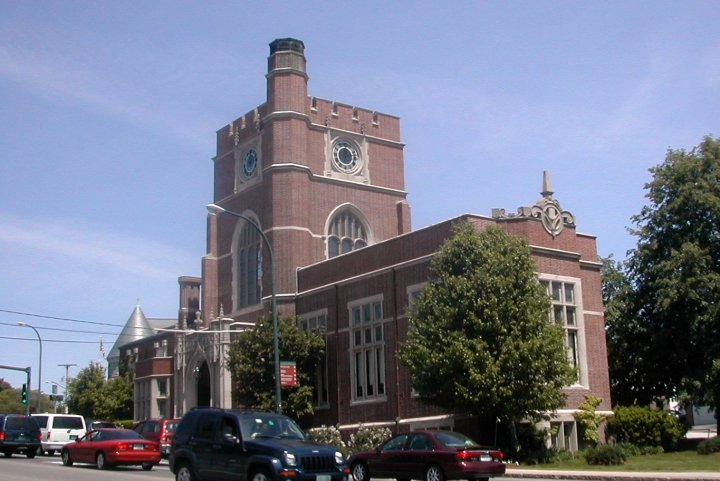

- Location within New Hampshire Location within the United States
- Location: 6 Main St., Nashua, New Hampshire
- Coordinates: 42°45′55″N 71°28′3″W
- Area: 0.5 acres (0.20 ha)
- Built: 1903
- Built by: Nashua Building Co.
- Architect: Cram & Associates
- Architectural style: Late Gothic Revival
- Part of: Nashville Historic District (ID84000574)
- NRHP reference No.: 71000049

Significant dates
- Added to NRHP: June 28, 1971
- Designated CP: December 13, 1984

The Hunt Memorial Library, also known as the John M. Hunt Memorial Building, is a historic former library building at 6 Main Street in downtown Nashua, New Hampshire. Built in 1903, it is a significant early work of the renowned Gothic Revival architect Ralph Adams Cram, then in partnership with Goodhue and Ferguson. The Nashua Public Library moved to a new building in 1971. The building is owned by the city and is available for rent for functions. It was listed on the National Register of Historic Places in 1971.

== Description and history ==
The Hunt Memorial Building is located at the northern end of downtown Nashua, at the southeast corner of Main and Lowell Streets. It is a multi-level structure built of brick laid in Flemish bond, with limestone trim. Its three-story square tower is an imposing presence at the upper end of Main Street, with a staircase turret projecting from one corner. The tower has buttressed corners and large Gothic-arched windows, and houses a four-face clock in its upper level. It is topped by a crenellated parapet. The main entrance is located at the base of the tower, in a Gothic-arched opening with heavy oaken double doors with book-leaf panels.

The building was constructed in 1903, and is an early work of architect Ralph Adams Cram, then early in a distinguished career. Cram was a native of New Hampshire, and was during his career a major proponent of renewed interest in Gothic Revival architecture. The Hunt Building includes good examples of the architectural vocabulary Cram developed for this role. It was used as a library until 1971.

== See also ==
- National Register of Historic Places listings in Hillsborough County, New Hampshire
