= Alicia Gregg =

American politician

Member of the New Hampshire House of Representatives from the Hillsborough 7th district
- Incumbent
- Assumed office December 7, 2022
- Succeeded by: Jim Mahoney (elect)

Personal details
- Party: Democratic

Alicia Gregg is an American politician. She serves as a Democratic member for the Hillsborough 7th district of the New Hampshire House of Representatives.
