= Nashville Historic District (Nashua, New Hampshire) =

Historic district and former town in New Hampshire, United States

- U.S. National Register of Historic Places
- U.S. Historic district
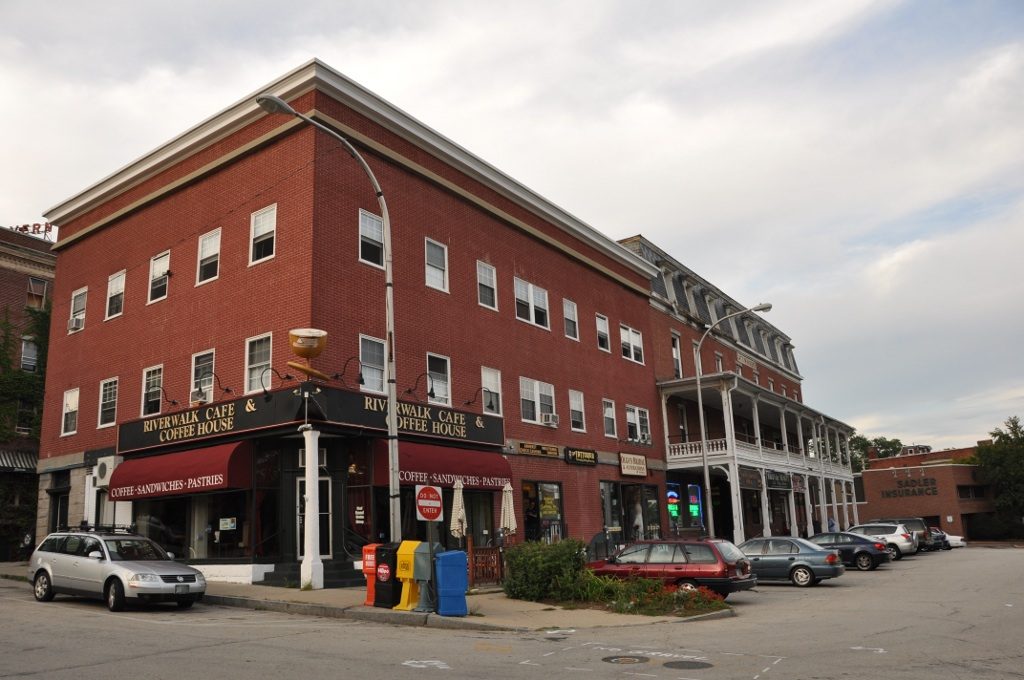
- Railroad Square: The white porch is the Laton House Hotel

- Location within New Hampshire Location within the United States
- Location: Roughly centered on the junction of Amherst, Concord, and Main streets, Nashua, New Hampshire
- Coordinates: 42°46′8″N 71°27′59″W
- Architectural style: Late Victorian, Italianate, Federal
- NRHP reference No.: 84000574
- Added to NRHP: December 13, 1984

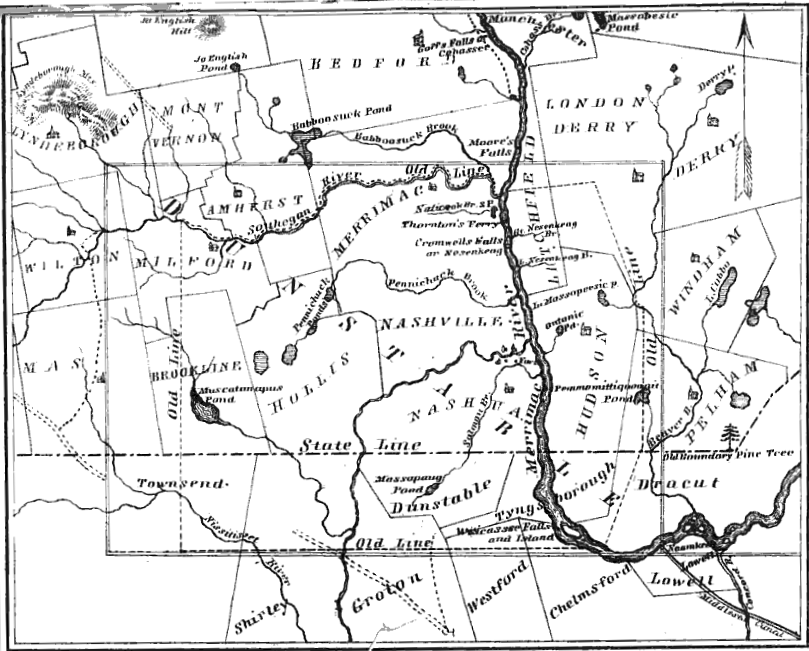
Map of old Dunstable, 1846, showing Nashville in the center

The Nashville Historic District in Nashua, New Hampshire is a historic district that was listed on the National Register of Historic Places (NRHP) in 1984. It encompasses an area just north of downtown Nashua, roughly centered on the junction of Concord, Amherst, and Main streets. Its southern bound is the Nashua River and Railroad Square, its eastern bounds are Railroad Square, Clinton, Lock, Orange, and Concord streets, its northern bound is Mount Pleasant Street, and its western boundary is Abbott, Amherst, Concord, and Main streets between the northern and southern bounds.

== History ==
Today this area is known as French Hill, but the NRHP district takes its name from a time in the 19th century when the area was briefly separated from Nashua as the town of "Nashville". This was due to the placement of a new Town Hall in the southern half of the city (which was more populated at the time). The northern contingent split themselves off, calling themselves "Nashville". The split came only six years after the town had renamed itself "Nashua", in 1836. The creation of a new railroad line from Lowell, Massachusetts, that ran along the northern length of the Nashua River had resulted in Union Square being renamed "Railroad Square" in 1838.

However, the railroad brought new economic prosperity and increased communication with Boston, and in 1853 the two town committees resolved their differences and a new town charter for the "City of Nashua" was enacted.

== Listed properties ==
- Abbot House of 1803 (1 Nashville Street)
- Ezekial Greeley House of c. 1825–1833 (7 Amherst Street)
- William Boardman House (2 Davis Court)
- Albert McKean House (35 Orange Street)
- Alfred Beard House (7 Crescent Street)
- General George Stark House of the early 1850s (22 Concord Street)
- J. Thornton Greeley House of c. 1860–1870 (41 Orange Street)
- Lovejoy-Ramsdell House of 1856 (30 Concord Street)
- Clark Boutwell House (c. 1850) despite the later addition of a mansard roof (10 Abbott Street)
- Alfred Norton House of 1877–1878 (55 Concord Street)
- James Wallace House of 1872 (19 Abbott Street)
- Charles Edwards House of 1876–1877 (3-5 Concord Street)
- Dana King House of 1879 — 47 Concord Street
- Charles Cotton House of 1875 (72-72A Concord Street)
- Henry Davis House of 1875 (15 Manchester Street)
- James Tolles House of 1890 (65 Concord Street)
- Frank Cook House of 1889 (66 Concord Street)
- Samuel Dearborn House of 1886 (5 Concord Street)
- Eugene McQuesten House of 1887 (51 Concord Street)
- John F. Stark House of 1886 (13 Manchester Street)
- Stephen Barker House of 1887 (71 Concord Street)
- Stephen Mansfield House of 1888–1889 (70 Concord Street)
- Lester Thurber House of 1895 (4 Manchester Street)
- George Anderson House of 1901–1902 (88 Concord Street)
- Elbert Wheeler House of 1902–1903 (94 Concord Street)
- Ella Gregg House of 1928 (10 French Street)
- William Beasom House of 1912 (77 Concord Street)
- Frank Anderson House of 1907–1908 (90 Concord Street)
- William Niles House of 1907–1908 (8 Abbott Street)

Commercial and public buildings:

- Greeley Block of 1833 and 1900 (13C-13D Clinton Street)
- Nashua & Lowell Freight House of c. 1853 (14-16 Railroad Square)
- Laton House Hotel of 1878–1881 (28 Railroad Square)
- Stearns' Block of 1898–1899 (17-19 Railroad Square)
- Whiting Block of 1892–1893 (29-37 Main Street)
- former First Baptist Church of 1849 (43-49 Main Street)
- First Church of Nashua of 1893–1894 (1 Concord Street)
- Hunt Memorial Building (2 Main Street)

== See also ==
- National Register of Historic Places listings in Hillsborough County, New Hampshire
- Nashua Manufacturing Company Historic District, just south of the Nashua River
