= Nashua, New Hampshire =

- City
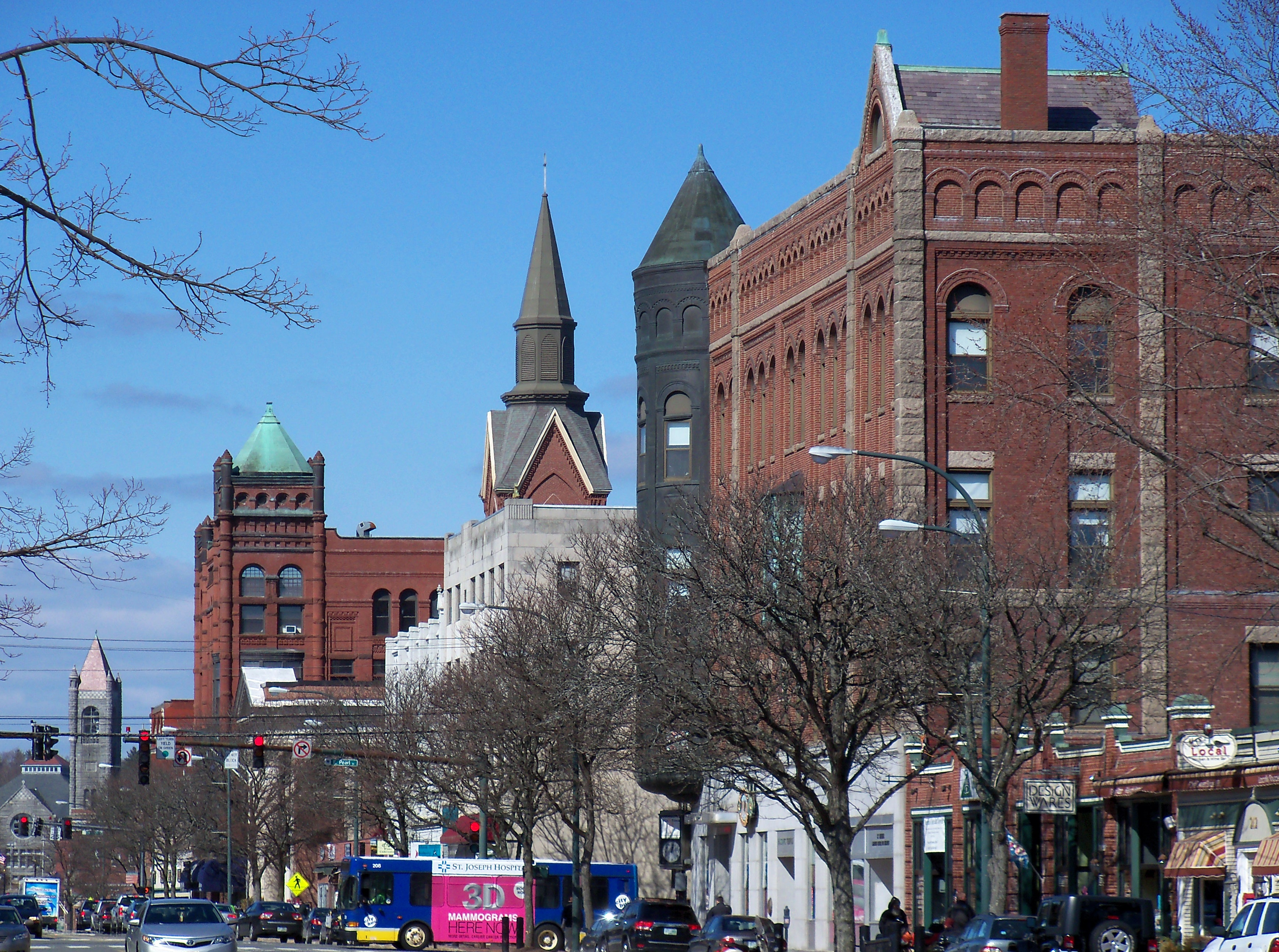
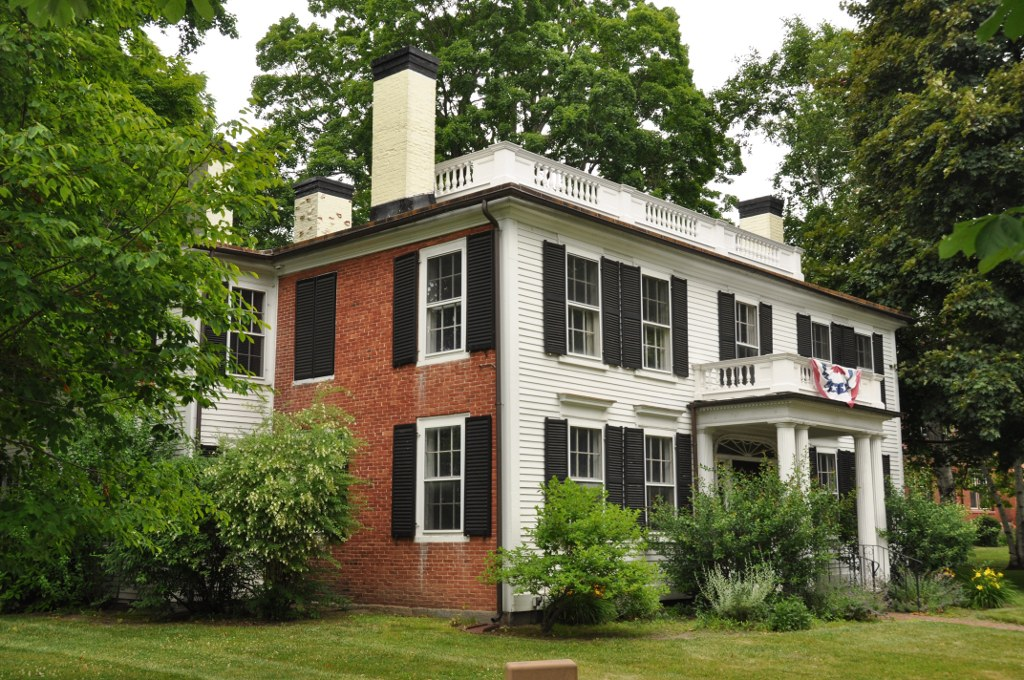
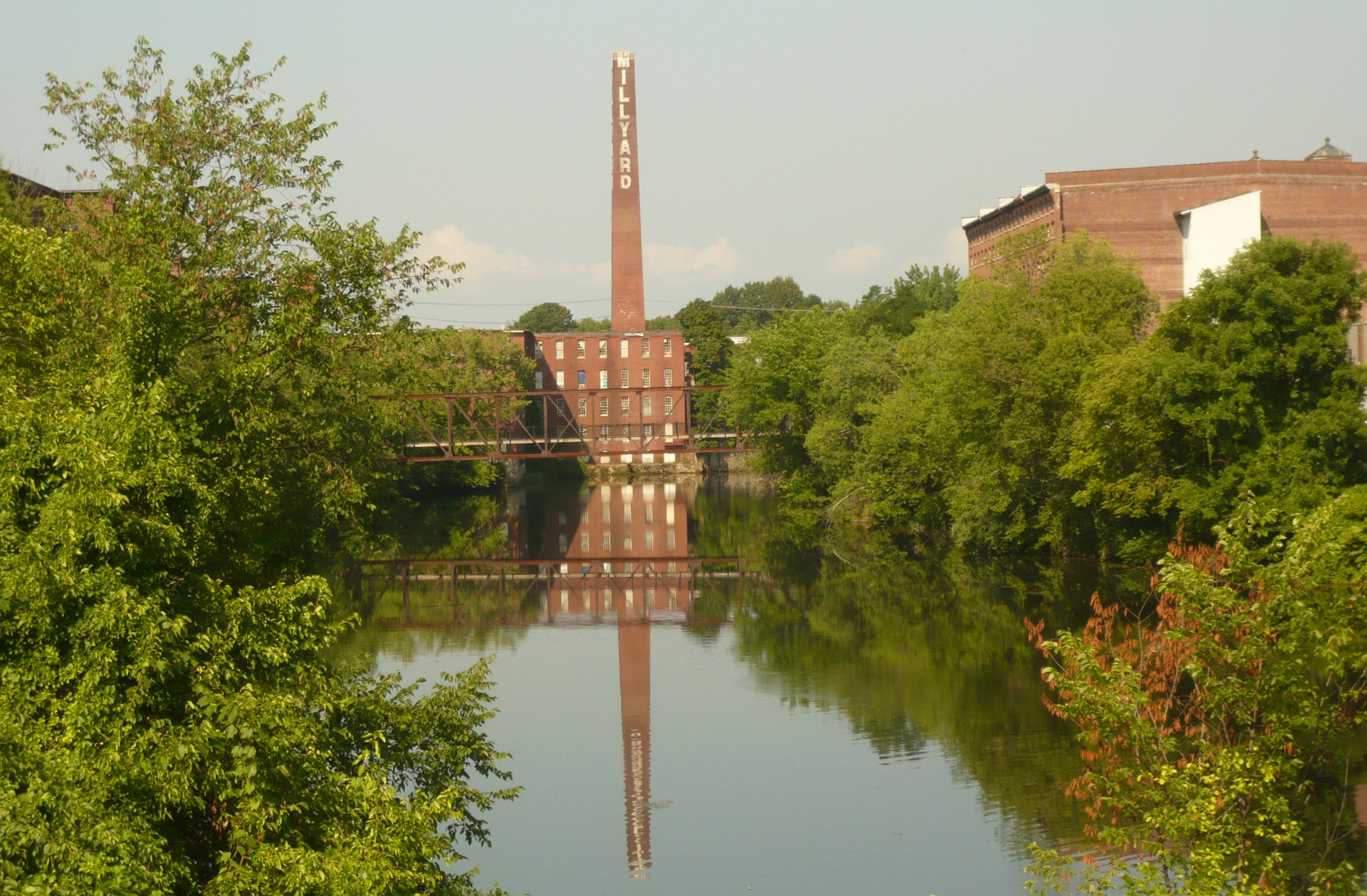
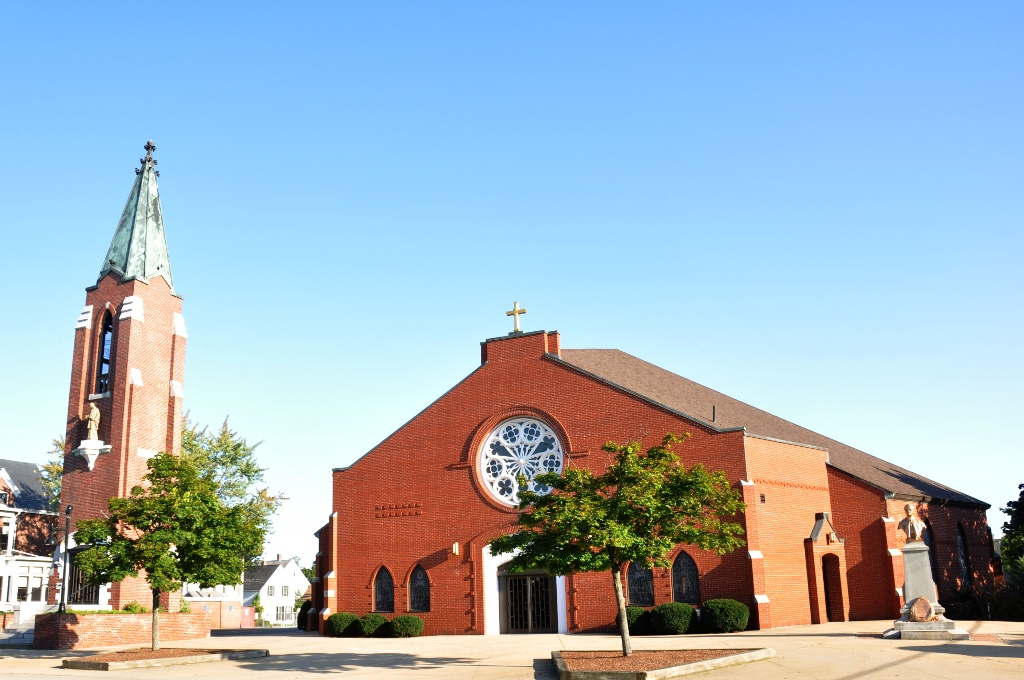
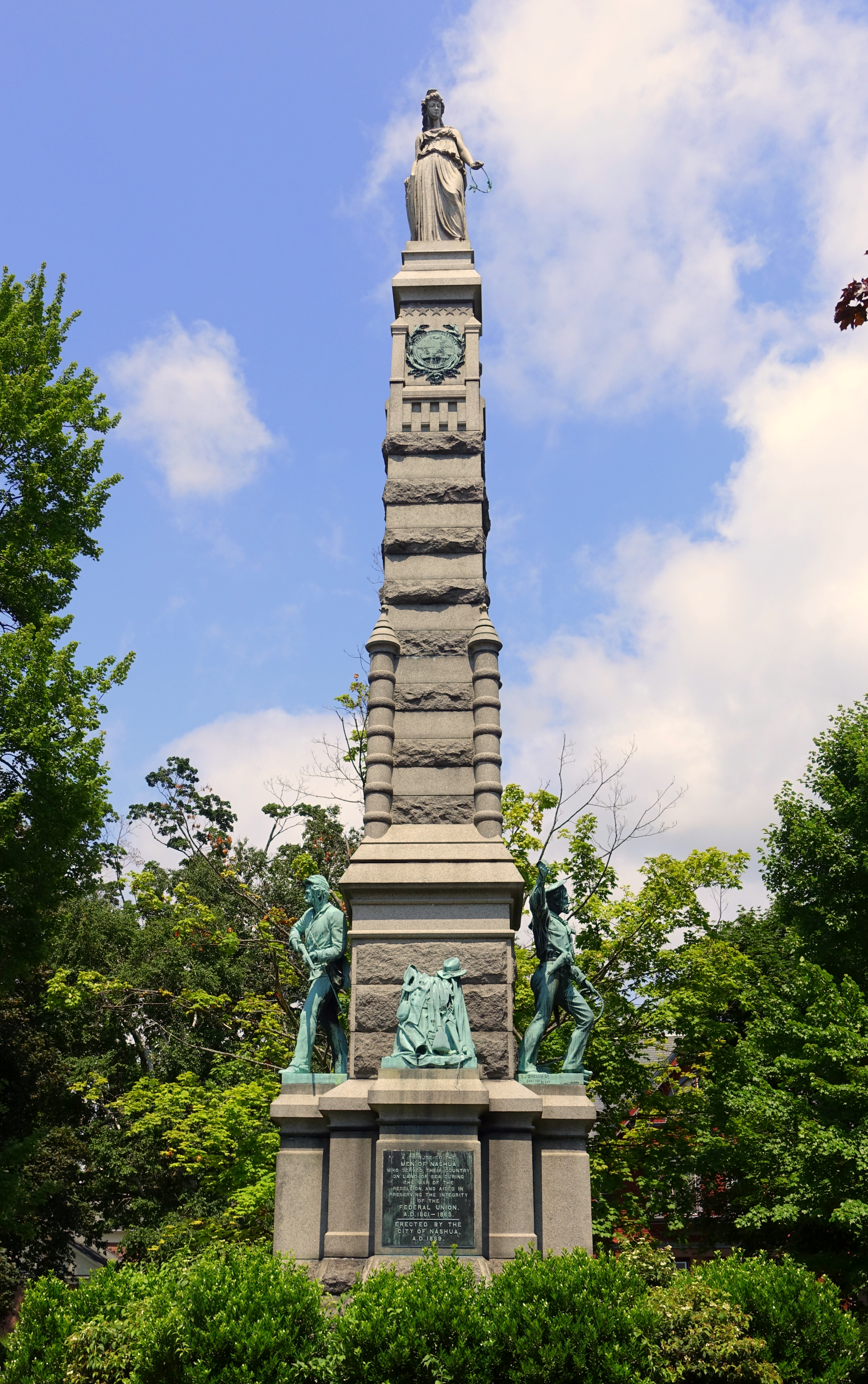
- Downtown Nashua Abbot House Nashua Millyard St. Aloysius of Gonzaga Church Soldiers and Sailors Monument

- Seal Logo
- Nickname: New Hampshire's Gate City
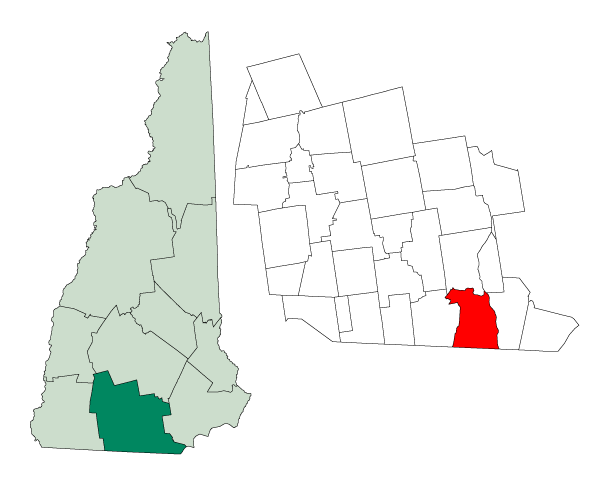
- Location in Hillsborough County, New Hampshire
- Coordinates: 42°45′27″N 71°27′52″W
- Country: United States
- State: New Hampshire
- County: Hillsborough
- Settled: 1655
- Town: 1746
- City: 1853

Government
  - Mayor: Jim Donchess
  - Board of Aldermen: Members: Lori Wilshire - President; Ben Clemons - Vice President; Richard A. Dowd; Amber Morgan; Paula Johnson; Shoshanna Kelly; Patricia Klee; Thomas Lopez; Alicia Gregg; Michael B. O'Brien Sr.; Tim Sennott; John Sullivan; Derek Thibeault; Vengerflutta Smith; Steven Chess

Area
  - City: 31.73 sq mi (82.19 km^{2})
  - Land: 30.83 sq mi (79.86 km^{2})
  - Water: 0.90 sq mi (2.33 km^{2}) 2.84%
- Elevation: 151 ft (46 m)

Population (2020)
  - City: 91,322
  - Density: 2,961.7/sq mi (1,143.52/km^{2})
  - Urban: 242,984 (US: 166th)
  - Urban density: 1,242.5/sq mi (479.7/km^{2})
- Demonym: Nashuan
- Time zone: UTC−5 (Eastern)
  - Summer (DST): UTC−4 (Eastern)
- ZIP Codes: 03060; 03061; 03062; 03063; 03064
- Area code: 603
- FIPS code: 33-50260
- GNIS feature ID: 0868677
- Website: www.nashuanh.gov

Nashua (/ˈnæʃuə/) is a city in southern New Hampshire, United States. As of the 2020 census, it had a population of 91,322, the second-largest in northern New England after nearby Manchester. It is one of two county seats of New Hampshire's most populous county, Hillsborough; the other being Manchester.

Built around the now-departed textile industry, in recent decades Nashua's economy has shifted to the financial and professional services, high tech, and defense industries as part of the economic recovery that started in the 1980s in the Greater Boston region. Major private employers in the city include Nashua Corporation, and BAE Systems. The city also hosts two major regional medical centers, Southern New Hampshire Medical Center and St. Joseph Hospital. The South Nashua commercial district is a major regional shopping destination, lying directly on the Massachusetts border and taking advantage of New Hampshire's lack of sales tax. It is anchored by the Pheasant Lane Mall and numerous smaller shopping centers.

It is one of several U.S. cities nicknamed Gate City, which references a reputation for being a travel gateway—in this case between the Boston region and New Hampshire. A number of civic groups and institutions have adopted the title.

== History ==
The area was part of a 200-square-mile (520 km^{2}) tract of land in Massachusetts called "Dunstable", named after Edward Tyng of Dunstable in England. Located at the confluence of the Nashua and Merrimack rivers, Dunstable was first settled about 1654 as a fur trading town. Nashua lies approximately in the center of the original 1673 grant. In 1732, Dunstable was split along the Merrimack River, with the town of Nottingham West (now the town of Hudson, New Hampshire) created out of the eastern portion. The previously disputed boundary between Massachusetts and New Hampshire was fixed in 1741 when the governorships of the two provinces were separated. As a result, the township of Dunstable was divided in two. Tyngsborough and some of Dunstable remained in Massachusetts, while Dunstable, New Hampshire, was incorporated in 1746 from the northern section of the town.

Like many 19th century riverfront New England communities, New Hampshire's Dunstable was developed during the Industrial Revolution with textile mills operated from water power. In 1823, the Nashua Manufacturing Company was incorporated. The company eventually had four mills and employed approximately 1,000 people. The following year, the Jackson Manufacturing Company was incorporated.

In 1836, the New Hampshire half of Dunstable was renamed "Nashua", after the Nashua River; the Dunstable name lives on across the Massachusetts border. The Nashua River was named by the Nashaway people, and in the Penacook language it means "beautiful stream with a pebbly bottom", with an alternative meaning of "land between two rivers". In 1842, the town split into two towns. Eleven years later, they joined back together under the name "Nashua", and were re-incorporated as a city. During the split, the northern area, known today as "French Hill", called itself "Nashville", while the southern part kept the name Nashua.

Six railroad lines crossed the mill town, namely the Nashua and Lowell, Worcester and Nashua, Nashua and Acton, Nashua and Wilton, Concord and Nashua, and Rochester railroads.

Like the rival Amoskeag Manufacturing Company upriver in Manchester, the Nashua mills prospered until about World War I, after which a slow decline set in. Water power was replaced with newer forms of energy to run factories, such as coal, and cotton could be manufactured into fabric where it grew, saving transportation costs.

In 1922, it was affected by the 1922 New England Textile Strike, shutting down the mills in the city over an attempted wage cut and hours increase. The textile business started moving to the South during the Great Depression, with the last mill near Nashua closing in 1949.

But then Sanders Associates, a newly created defense firm that is now part of BAE Systems, moved into one of the closed mills and helped restart the city's economy. Sanders Associates also played a key role in the development of the home video game console market. Ralph H. Baer, an employee of Sanders, developed what would become the Magnavox Odyssey, the first commercial home video game system. The arrival of Digital Equipment Corporation, now part of Hewlett-Packard, in the 1970s made the city part of the Boston-area high-tech corridor.

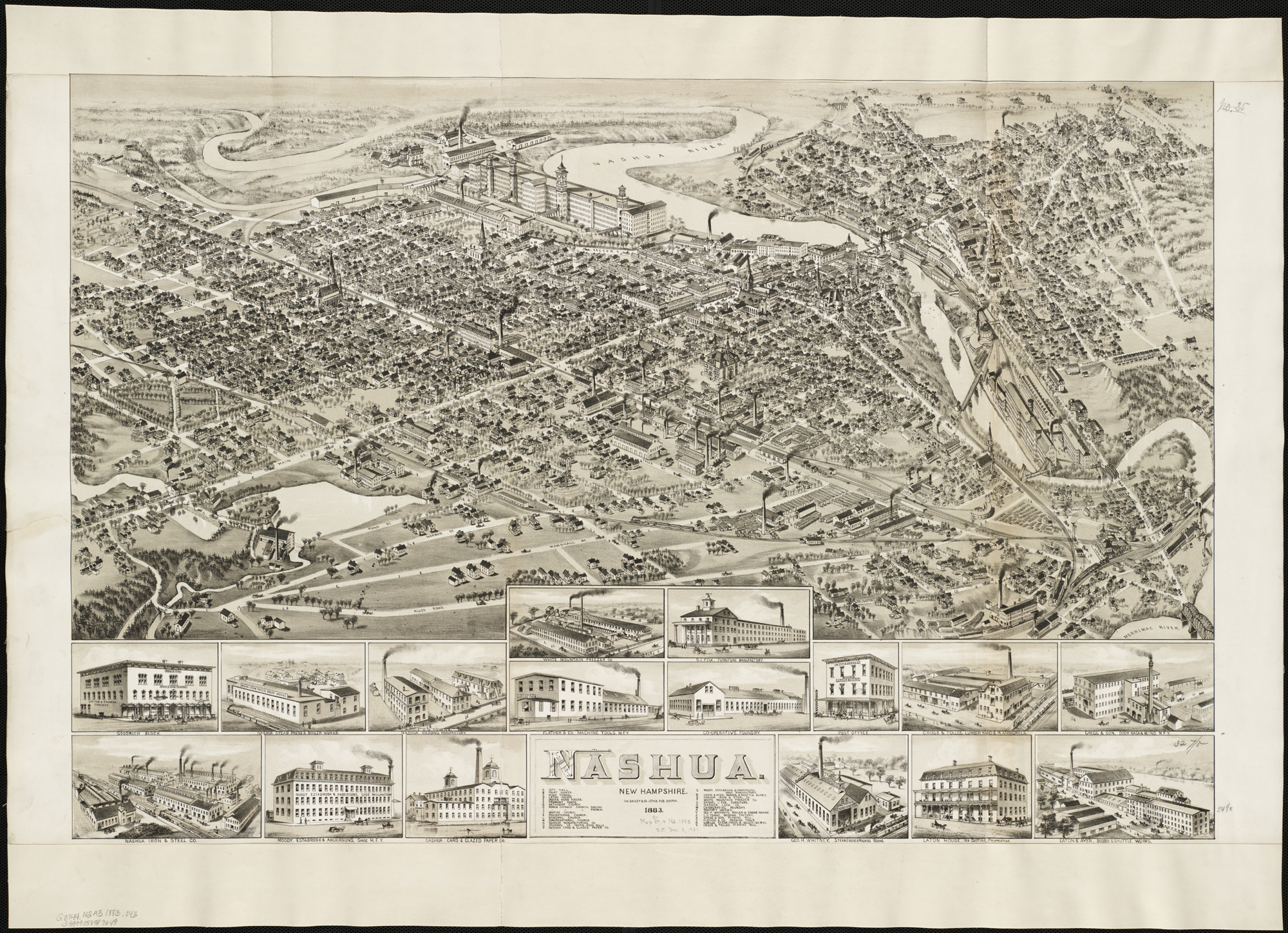
An 1883 bird's-eye engraving of Nashua

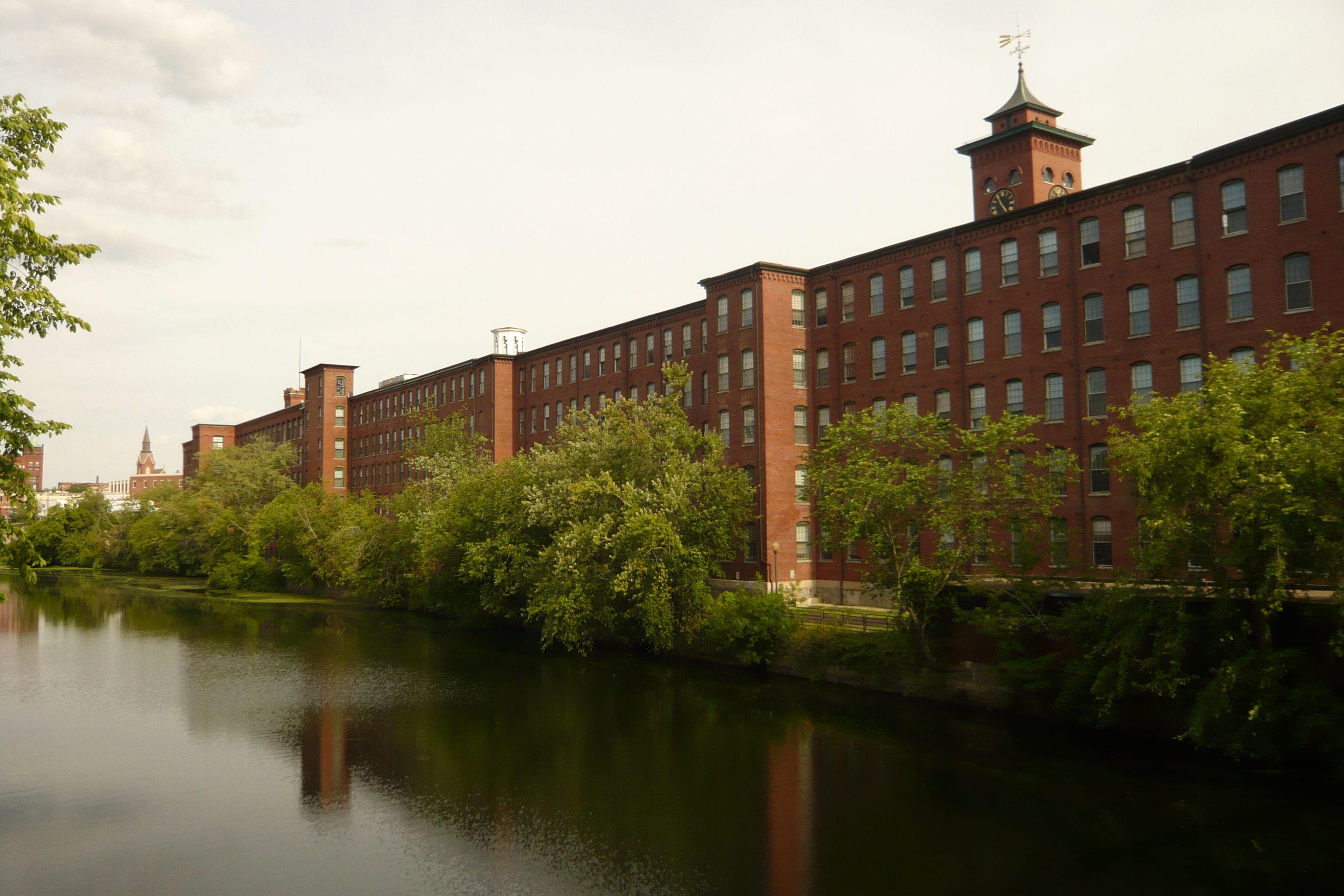
The Nashua Millyard

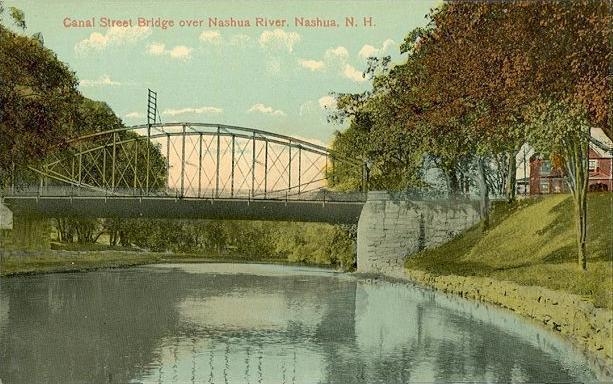
Canal St. Bridge, c. 1908

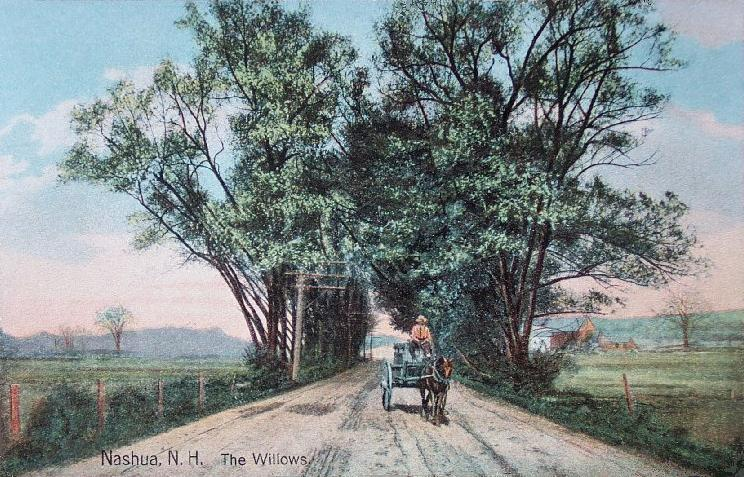
The Willows, c. 1910; the road is now Route 101A near Somerset Plaza.

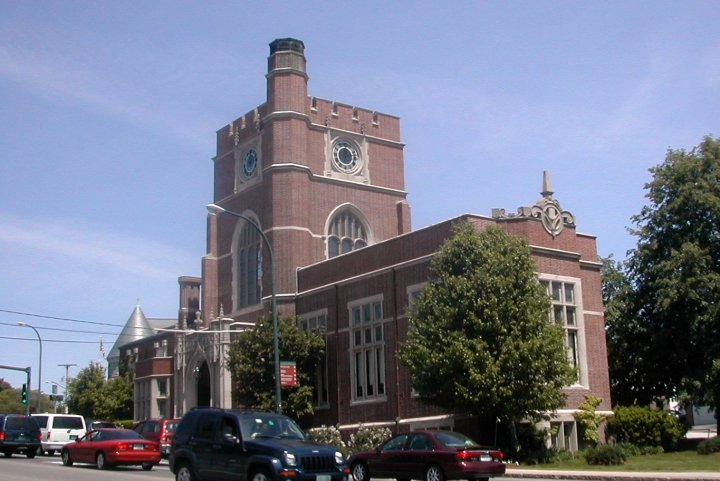
Hunt Memorial Library in 2006

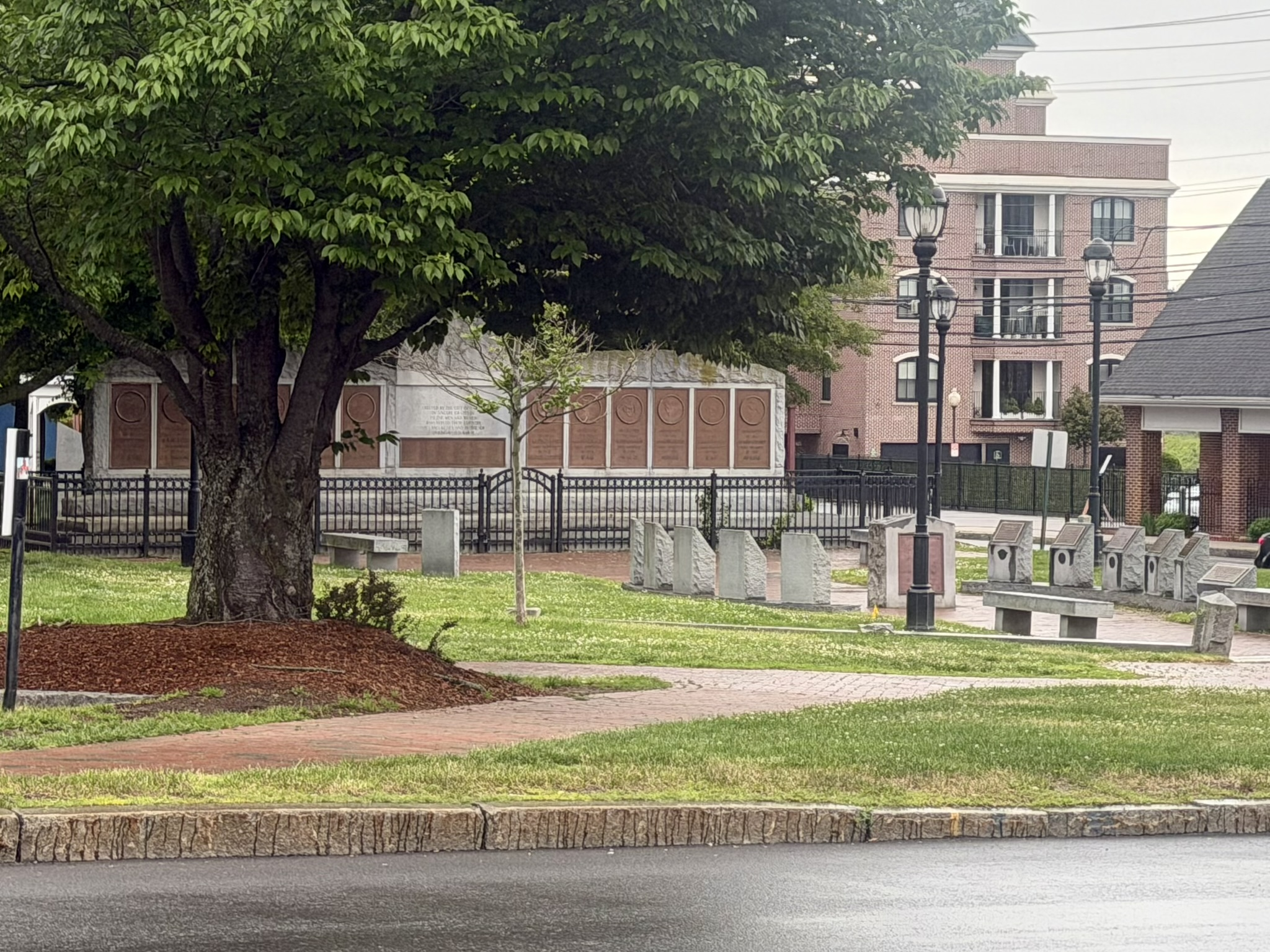
Deschenes Oval and the World War II Memorial in Railroad Square, 2026.

== Geography ==
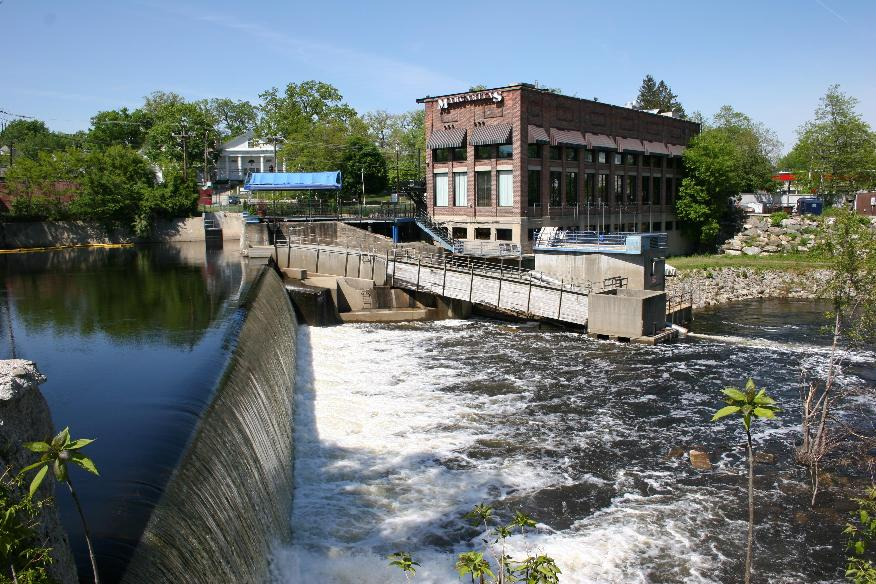
Nashua River Dam in 2006

Nashua is in southeastern Hillsborough County. It is bordered to the south by Middlesex County, Massachusetts.

According to the United States Census Bureau, the city has a total area of 31.7 square miles (82.2 km^{2}), of which 30.8 square miles (79.9 km^{2}) are land and 0.89 square miles (2.3 km^{2}) are water, comprising 2.84% of the city. The eastern boundary of Nashua is formed by the Merrimack River, and the city is drained by the Nashua River and Salmon Brook, tributaries of the Merrimack. The Nashua River roughly bisects the city. Pennichuck Brook forms the city's northern boundary. The highest point in Nashua is Gilboa Hill in the southern part of the city, at 426 feet (130 m) above sea level.

=== Climate ===
Nashua has a four-season humid continental climate with a hot summer subtype, (Köppen Dfa) with short spring and autumn transitions, long humid (often oppressive) and very warm to hot summers, and cold winters. One of New England's hotspots, Nashua experiences an average of 26-30 days of 90-degree heat per year. The monthly daily average temperature ranges from 24.1 °F (−4.4 °C) in January to 72.7 °F (22.6 °C) in July. On average, there are 8.7 days of sub-0 °F (−18 °C) lows. Precipitation is well-spread throughout the year, though winter is the driest. Snowfall, the heaviest of which typically comes from nor'easters, averages around 52 inches (132 cm) per season, but can vary widely from year to year. Nashua recorded the New Hampshire state record high temperature of 106 °F (41 °C) during the deadly 1911 heat wave.

Climate data for Nashua, New Hampshire (1991–2020 normals, extremes 1885–present)
Month	Jan	Feb	Mar	Apr	May	Jun	Jul	Aug	Sep	Oct	Nov	Dec	Year
Record high °F (°C)	69 (21)	76 (24)	85 (29)	93 (34)	100 (38)	101 (38)	106 (41)	105 (41)	99 (37)	91 (33)	81 (27)	73 (23)	106 (41)
Mean maximum °F (°C)	55.7 (13.2)	57.2 (14.0)	66.9 (19.4)	81.0 (27.2)	88.7 (31.5)	92.1 (33.4)	94.2 (34.6)	92.0 (33.3)	88.8 (31.6)	78.9 (26.1)	69.3 (20.7)	59.1 (15.1)	96.0 (35.6)
Mean daily maximum °F (°C)	34.4 (1.3)	37.4 (3.0)	45.1 (7.3)	58.5 (14.7)	70.0 (21.1)	78.4 (25.8)	84.0 (28.9)	82.6 (28.1)	75.3 (24.1)	62.8 (17.1)	51.0 (10.6)	40.0 (4.4)	60.0 (15.6)
Daily mean °F (°C)	24.1 (−4.4)	26.1 (−3.3)	34.3 (1.3)	46.4 (8.0)	58.0 (14.4)	67.1 (19.5)	72.7 (22.6)	70.9 (21.6)	63.3 (17.4)	50.8 (10.4)	40.2 (4.6)	30.4 (−0.9)	48.7 (9.3)
Mean daily minimum °F (°C)	13.7 (−10.2)	14.9 (−9.5)	23.4 (−4.8)	34.4 (1.3)	46.0 (7.8)	55.8 (13.2)	61.4 (16.3)	59.3 (15.2)	51.2 (10.7)	38.8 (3.8)	29.5 (−1.4)	20.8 (−6.2)	37.4 (3.0)
Mean minimum °F (°C)	−4.7 (−20.4)	−1.3 (−18.5)	6.4 (−14.2)	23.9 (−4.5)	32.7 (0.4)	42.4 (5.8)	51.0 (10.6)	48.2 (9.0)	36.4 (2.4)	26.3 (−3.2)	16.5 (−8.6)	4.6 (−15.2)	−7.5 (−21.9)
Record low °F (°C)	−29 (−34)	−35 (−37)	−18 (−28)	8 (−13)	20 (−7)	31 (−1)	37 (3)	31 (−1)	23 (−5)	12 (−11)	−7 (−22)	−24 (−31)	−35 (−37)
Average precipitation inches (mm)	3.44 (87)	3.22 (82)	4.31 (109)	4.21 (107)	3.90 (99)	4.32 (110)	3.65 (93)	3.91 (99)	4.05 (103)	4.84 (123)	3.88 (99)	4.46 (113)	48.19 (1,224)
Average snowfall inches (cm)	14.7 (37)	14.5 (37)	10.1 (26)	0.7 (1.8)	0.0 (0.0)	0.0 (0.0)	0.0 (0.0)	0.0 (0.0)	0.0 (0.0)	0.0 (0.0)	1.7 (4.3)	11.2 (28)	52.9 (134)
Average precipitation days (≥ 0.01 in)	9.2	8.4	9.2	10.8	12.1	10.9	10.4	9.3	9.2	10.8	10.0	10.1	120.4
Average snowy days (≥ 0.1 in)	5.4	4.8	3.4	0.5	0.0	0.0	0.0	0.0	0.0	0.1	0.8	3.9	18.9
Source: NOAA

== Demographics ==
Historical population
Census	Pop.	Note	%±
1790	632		—
1800	862		36.4%
1810	1,049		21.7%
1820	1,142		8.9%
1830	2,417		111.6%
1840	6,054		150.5%
1850	5,820		−3.9%
1860	10,065		72.9%
1870	10,543		4.7%
1880	13,397		27.1%
1890	19,311		44.1%
1900	23,898		23.8%
1910	26,005		8.8%
1920	28,379		9.1%
1930	31,463		10.9%
1940	32,927		4.7%
1950	34,669		5.3%
1960	39,096		12.8%
1970	55,820		42.8%
1980	67,865		21.6%
1990	79,662		17.4%
2000	86,605		8.7%
2010	86,494		−0.1%
2020	91,322		5.6%
2024 (est.)	91,851		0.6%
U.S. Decennial Census

=== Racial and ethnic composition ===
Nashua, New Hampshire – Racial and ethnic composition Note: the US Census treats Hispanic/Latino as an ethnic category. This table excludes Latinos from the racial categories and assigns them to a separate category. Hispanics/Latinos may be of any race.
Race / Ethnicity (NH = Non-Hispanic)	Pop 2000	Pop 2010	Pop 2020	% 2000	% 2010	% 2020
White alone (NH)	74,907	68,309	64,225	86.49%	78.98%	70.30%
Black or African American alone (NH)	1,571	1,954	2,383	1.81%	2.26%	2.61%
Native American or Alaska Native alone (NH)	220	167	130	0.25%	0.19%	0.14%
Asian alone (NH)	3,339	5,600	7,112	3.86%	6.47%	7.79%
Pacific Islander alone (NH)	26	18	29	0.03%	0.02%	0.03%
Some Other Race alone (NH)	247	452	817	0.29%	0.52%	0.89%
Mixed Race or Multi-Racial (NH)	907	1,484	3,939	1.05%	1.72%	4.31%
Hispanic or Latino (any race)	5,388	8,510	12,687	6.22%	9.84%	13.89%
Total	86,605	86,494	91,322	100.00%	100.00%	100.00%

=== 2020 census ===
As of the 2020 census, Nashua had a population of 91,322. The median age was 40.4 years. 19.2% of residents were under the age of 18 and 16.7% of residents were 65 years of age or older. For every 100 females there were 98.2 males, and for every 100 females age 18 and over there were 96.8 males age 18 and over.

99.7% of residents lived in urban areas, while 0.3% lived in rural areas.

There were 38,243 households in Nashua, of which 26.2% had children under the age of 18 living in them. Of all households, 43.3% were married-couple households, 21.2% were households with a male householder and no spouse or partner present, and 26.9% were households with a female householder and no spouse or partner present. About 31.1% of all households were made up of individuals and 11.9% had someone living alone who was 65 years of age or older.

There were 39,663 housing units, of which 3.6% were vacant. The homeowner vacancy rate was 0.9% and the rental vacancy rate was 3.4%.

Racial composition as of the 2020 census
Race	Number	Percent
White	66,795	73.1%
Black or African American	2,697	3.0%
American Indian and Alaska Native	269	0.3%
Asian	7,154	7.8%
Native Hawaiian and Other Pacific Islander	33	0.0%
Some other race	6,176	6.8%
Two or more races	8,198	9.0%
Hispanic or Latino (of any race)	12,687	13.9%

=== 2010 census ===
As of the census of 2010, there were 86,494 people, 35,044 households, and 21,876 families residing in the city. The population density was 2,719.9 inhabitants per square mile (1,050.2/km^{2}). There were 37,168 housing units at an average density of 1,202.8 per square mile (464.4/km^{2}). The racial makeup of the city was 83.4% White, 2.7% African American, 0.3% Native American, 6.5% Asian, 0.03% Pacific Islander, 4.6% from some other race, and 2.5% from two or more races. Hispanic or Latino of any race were 9.8% of the population.

There were 35,044 households, out of which 28.7% had children under the age of 18 living with them, 45.9% were married couples living together, 11.6% had a female householder with no husband present, and 37.6% were non-families. 29.4% of all households were made up of individuals, and 9.6% had someone living alone who was 65 years of age or older. The average household size was 2.42 and the average family size was 3.01.

In the city the population was spread out, with 22.1% under the age of 18, 9.3% from 18 to 24, 28.0% from 25 to 44, 27.8% from 45 to 64, and 12.7% who were 65 years of age or older. The median age was 38.5 years. For every 100 females, there were 97.3 males. For every 100 females age 18 and over, there were 95.8 males.

=== Income ===
In 2011 the estimated median income for a household in the city was $60,923, and the median income for a family was $76,612. Male full-time workers had a median income of $60,365 versus $43,212 for females. The per capita income for the city was $30,937. About 4.6% of families and 9.3% of the population were below the poverty line, including 11.4% of those under age 18 and 5.9% of those age 65 or over.

== Economy ==
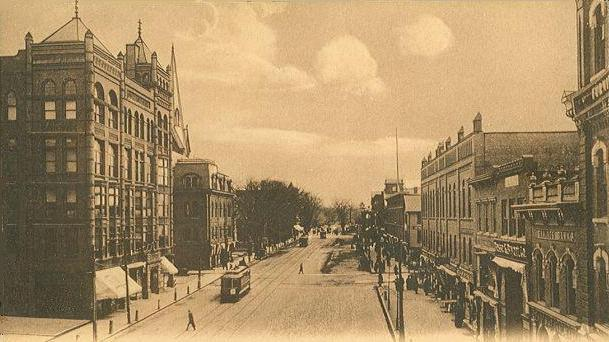
Main Street c. 1905

Nashua has three main commercial districts. Centered on Main Street near the geographic center of the city, Downtown Nashua is the oldest of the commercial districts, featuring commercial, entertainment, and dining venues, near historic commercial buildings and homes as well. Recent plans have incorporated the Nashua River into the design of a pedestrian-friendly walkway. The downtown Nashua Riverwalk is a large, public/private venture funded through the use of tax increment financing (TIF). Amherst Street (Route 101A) is in the northwestern part of the city and is a large thoroughfare with commercial centers along both sides. The South Nashua Commercial District, centered on Daniel Webster Highway near the Massachusetts border, is anchored by the Pheasant Lane Mall, attracting many people from Massachusetts taking advantage of the lack of sales tax in New Hampshire.

The city is home to a number of technical firms, including Nashua Corporation, which took its name from the city and river. Nashua Corp. was a leading producer of floppy disks through the early 1990s, making the Nashua name well known in the world of personal computers.

Defense contractor BAE Systems (formerly Sanders Associates), computer firm Dell, and software company Oracle Corporation are the largest representatives of the high-tech industry prominent in the region. The Boston Air Route Traffic Control Center is in Nashua. The three-building campus that once housed a Digital Equipment Corporation software development facility was sold to the John Flatley Company, which has renamed it "Nashua Technology Park".

== Sports ==
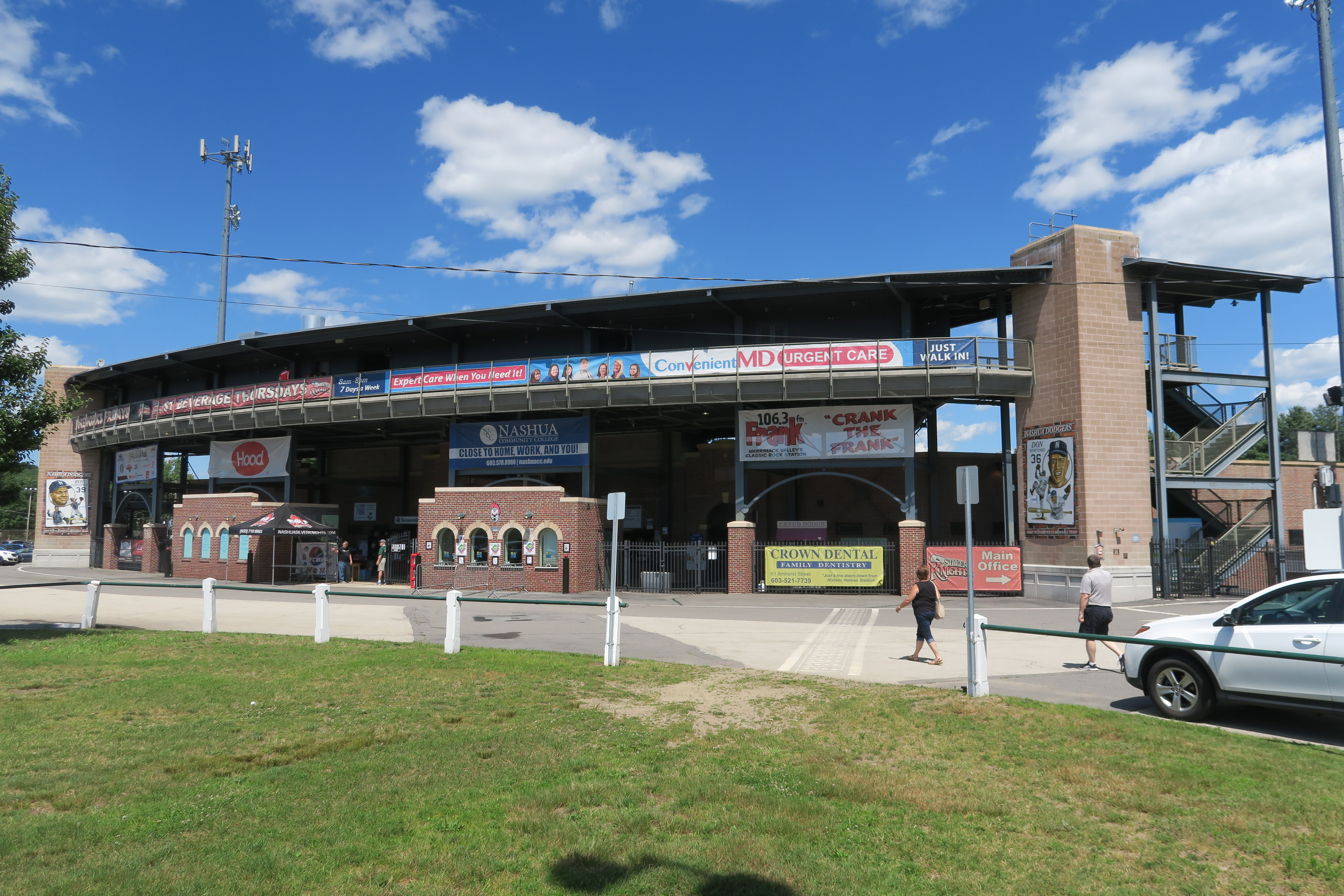
Holman Stadium, 2017

Nashua has had a series of amateur, semi-professional, and professional baseball teams. The Nashua Silver Knights, part of the Futures Collegiate Baseball League of New England (FCBL), is the city's current team. The Nashua Pride, a Can-Am minor league baseball team, played at Holman Stadium from 1998 through 2008, then changed to the American Defenders of New Hampshire in the 2009 season. The Defenders were evicted from the venue in August 2009, however, because of non-payment of rent, and moved to Pittsfield, Massachusetts to become the Pittsfield Colonials. Before the Pride, Holman was the home stadium for the independent Nashua Hawks; the AA Nashua Pirates; the AA Nashua Angels; and the A Nashua Dodgers, the first racially integrated professional baseball team in the 20th century. After minor league baseball began in Nashua in 1885, the team hosted the Nashua Millionaires franchise, with the team playing in the New England League from 1901 to 1933.

In collegiate sports, Nashua is home to the Rivier University Raiders, who compete in the Great Northeast Athletic Conference (GNAC).

The Spartans Drum and Bugle Corps (1997, 1998, 2004, 2007 Drum Corps International Division II Champions and 2019 Open Class Champions) is based in Nashua.

== Government ==
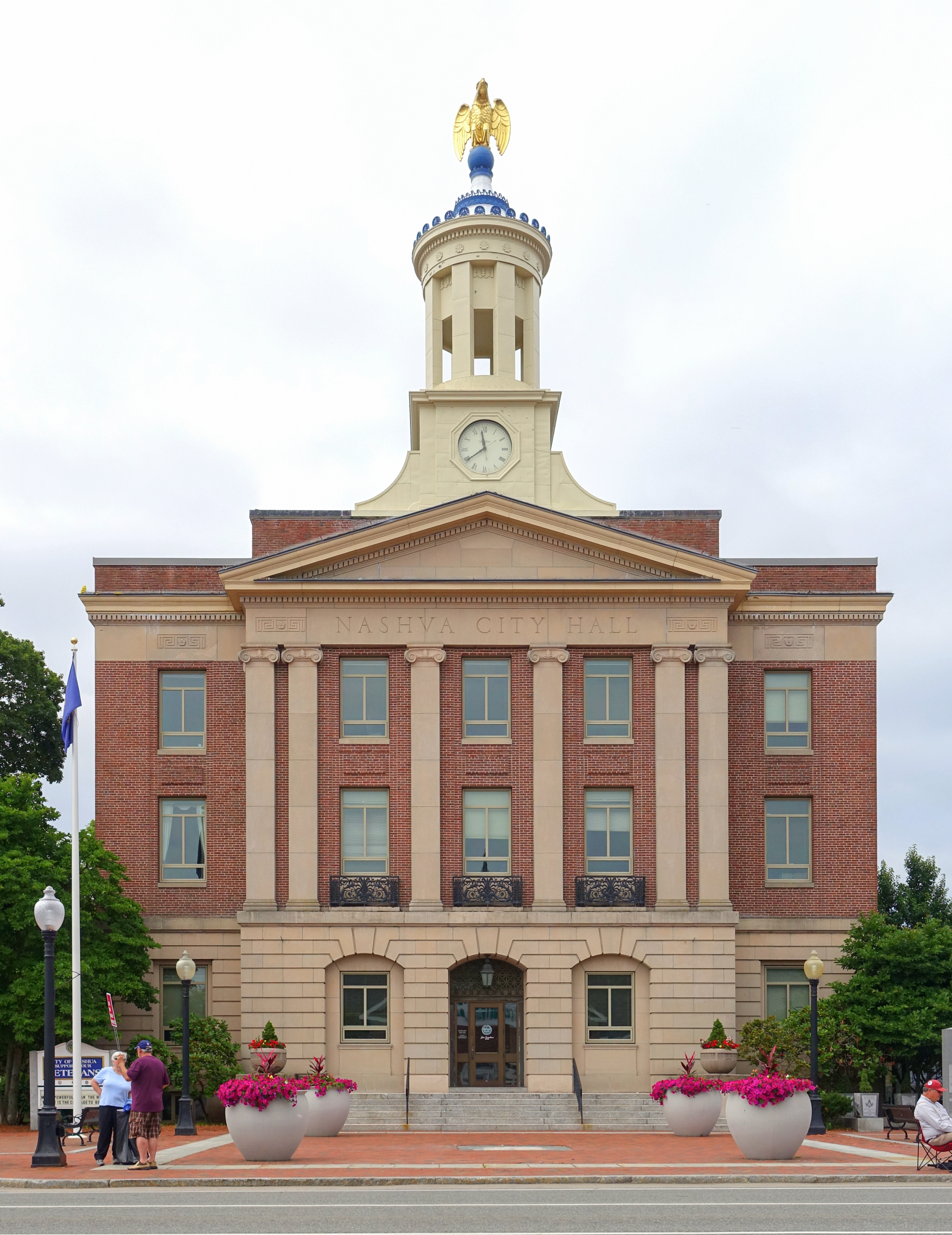
Nashua City Hall

The city's government is headed by a mayor and fifteen aldermen: six at-large aldermen elected three at a time every four years, and nine ward aldermen, one for each ward in the city, elected every two years.

In the New Hampshire General Court, Nashua is represented in the House by Hillsborough County's 3rd (Ward 4), 4th (Ward 2), 5th (Ward 1), 6th (Ward 3), 7th (Ward 7), 8th (Ward 6), 9th (Ward 5), 10th (Ward 9), and 11th (Ward 8) districts and in the Senate by District 12 (Wards 1, 2, and 5, shared with Hollis, Mason, Brookline, Greenville, New Ipswich, and Rindge) and District 13 (Wards 3, 4, 6, 7, 8, and 9).

In the New Hampshire Senate, Nashua is represented by two state senators:

- Republican Kevin Avard (District 12) – Wards 1–2, 5
- Democrat Cindy Rosenwald (District 13) – Wards 3–4, 6–9

In the New Hampshire Executive Council, Nashua is included within the 5th District and is currently represented by Republican Dave Wheeler. Nashua is included within New Hampshire's 2nd congressional district and is currently represented by Democrat Maggie Goodlander in the U.S. House of Representatives.

At the presidential level, Nashua leans strongly towards Democrats. George H. W. Bush was the last Republican presidential nominee to win Nashua, in 1988.

== Education ==
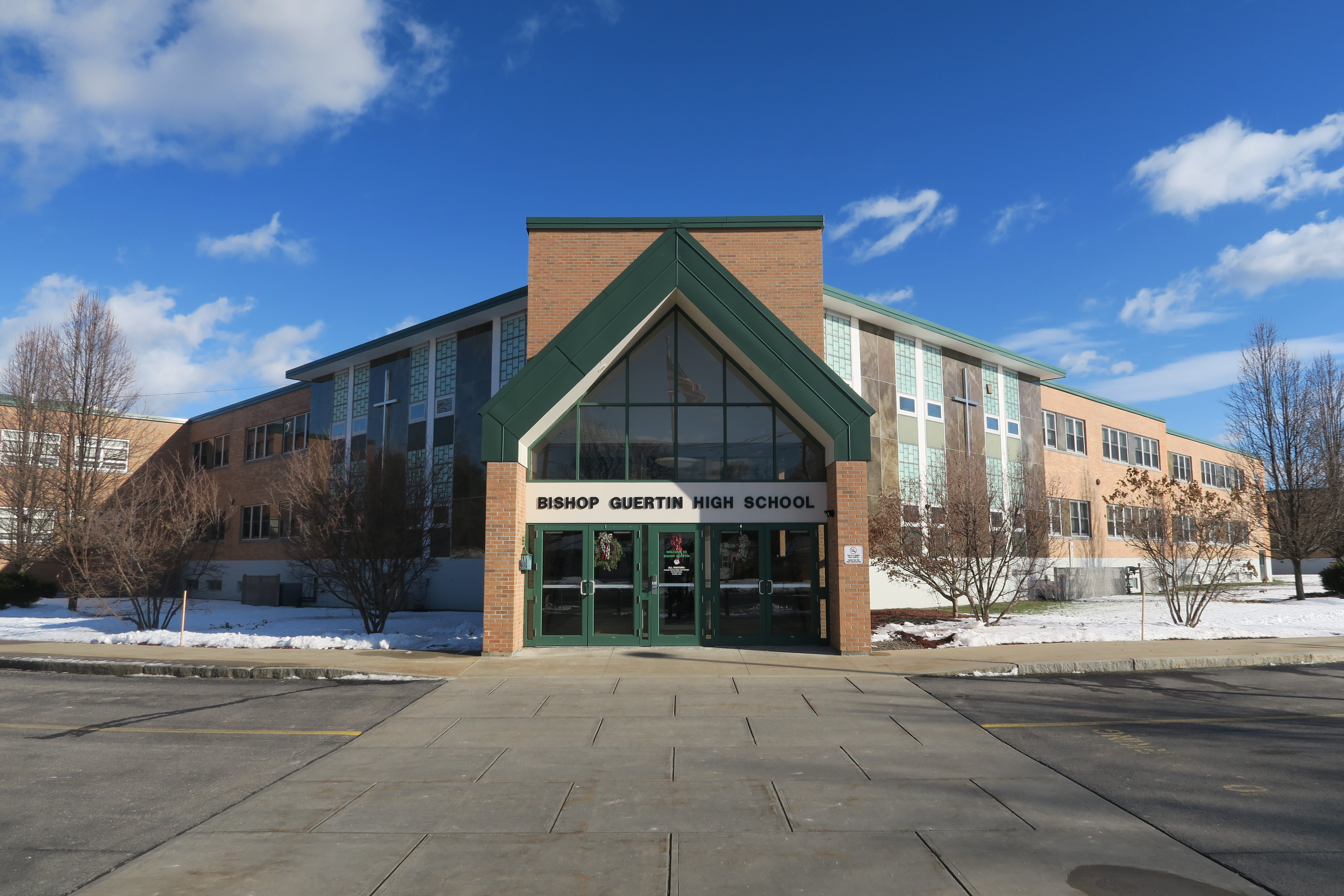
Bishop Guertin High School

In the 2000 U.S. Census, 22,700 residents over age three were enrolled in a Nashua educational institution, approximately a fourth of the city.

=== Secondary schools ===
==== Public ====
- Nashua High School South (formerly Nashua High School, 1976–2004)
- Nashua High School North
- Brentwood Academy
- Clearway Alternative High School

==== Private ====
- Bishop Guertin High School, a coeducational Catholic high school

==== Public charter school ====
- Academy for Science and Design

=== Middle schools ===
==== Public ====
- Brian S. McCarthy Middle School
- Fairgrounds Middle School
- Pennichuck Middle School

==== Private ====
- Saint Christopher Academy (Upper Campus)
- World Academy

=== Elementary schools ===
==== Public ====
- Amherst Street Elementary School
- Bicentennial Elementary School
- Birch Hill Elementary School
- Broad Street Elementary School
- Charlotte Avenue Elementary School
- Dr. Norman W. Crisp Elementary School
- Fairgrounds Elementary School
- Ledge Street Elementary School
- Main Dunstable Elementary School
- Mount Pleasant Elementary School
- New Searles Elementary School
- Sunset Heights Elementary School

=== Colleges ===
- Nashua Community College (NCC)
  - Granite State College, which shares a campus with NCC.
- Rivier University
- Hellenic American University

=== Former colleges ===
- Daniel Webster College (DWC): 50 acres (20 ha), closed in May 2017. Purchased by a Chinese investor after it closed, but still abandoned.
- Southern New Hampshire University's Nashua campus

== Media ==
The local newspaper is The Telegraph, with daily news published online and a weekly printed edition.

Nashua radio stations include oldies station WGHM 900 AM (ESPN affiliate), talk station WSMN 1590 AM, and 106.3 WFNQ, a classic hits station owned by Binnie Media. WEVS 88.3 and 90.3 serve as the stations for New Hampshire Public Radio. The city is part of the Manchester radio market and can also receive almost all Boston-market stations clearly.

One television station is licensed to Nashua. WBTS-CD (channel 15) is owned by NBC Owned Television Stations, and serves as the NBC owned-and-operated station for the Boston market. The station moved from its own transmitter to a channel share with PBS member station WGBX-TV from their Needham, Massachusetts tower in 2018 upon NBC's assumption of ownership, letting it broadcast the "NBC Boston" service (previously carried by a low-power station in Boston and subchannels of other stations) across the entire market. As WYCN-CD, it formerly carried a number of smaller networks, along with local programming and community calendar information of interest to Nashuans, until the sale to NBC.

== Infrastructure ==
=== Transportation ===
==== Roads ====
The Everett Turnpike is the major highway running through the city. US 3 follows the turnpike from the Massachusetts border north to Exit 7E, where it branches to the northeast along the two-lane Henri A. Burque Highway to Concord Street and then heads north into the town of Merrimack. Other New Hampshire state highways in the city include:

- NH 101A, which enters the city from the northwest and follows Amherst Street to its terminus at Main Street.
- NH 111, which enters the city from the southwest and follows Hollis Street to the city's eastern border at the Merrimack River, crossing into Hudson on the twin-span Taylor Falls/Veterans Memorial bridges.
- NH 111A, which enters the city from the southwest and follows Groton Road to Main Dunstable Road to its terminus at Hollis Street.
- NH 130, which enters the city from the west and follows Broad Street to its terminus at Amherst Street.

Maps of the Nashua area often show a stretch of freeway forming a circumferential highway through Nashua and the neighboring town of Hudson. Only a small section of the south end of this highway (Exit 2 off US 3) has been built, and it is unclear whether the highway will ever be completed. If finished, the Nashua-Hudson Circumferential Highway would be part of the Everett Turnpike, and would rejoin the mainline highway at a hypothetical Exit 9 in northern Nashua.

In 2015, after four years of construction, the city completed the Broad Street Parkway, which connects Exit 6 of the Everett Turnpike to the city's downtown area ("Tree Streets" neighborhood), with the goal of easing traffic congestion and opening up Nashua's old mill-yard as part of the city's economic development. The new parkway provides a third crossing of the Nashua River and a way for traffic to avoid Library Hill, a busy downtown intersection. The idea of a road connecting Broad Street with Hollis Street within the city had been discussed since the 1960s.

Public transportation is provided by the Nashua Transit System, which has nine scheduled bus routes in the city. Boston Express, a subsidiary of Concord Coach Lines, operates a Nashua-Boston bus line that runs out of the Nashua Transit Center off Exit 8 on the Everett Turnpike. This line transports passengers to South Station and Logan International Airport in Boston.

==== Airport ====
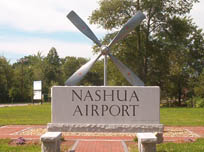
Entrance of Boire Field, Nashua's airport

Nashua Airport (Boire Field), a general aviation facility, is in the city's northwest corner. The nearest airports with scheduled airline service are Manchester–Boston Regional Airport in Manchester and Logan International Airport in Boston.

==== Past trolley ====
Historically, Nashua was a hub for the trolley system in New Hampshire. Trolleys could be taken south to Boston, as well as north into Manchester and to locations as far east as Hampton, New Hampshire. The trolley also connected different areas of the city, with the Nashua line ending at the city dance hall. The trolley system decreased in popularity in the 20th century, finally closing in 1932.

==== Future railroad ====
Efforts are being made to extend the MBTA Commuter Rail's Lowell Line from Lowell to Manchester, stopping at Nashua along the way. The state legislature created the New Hampshire Rail Transit Authority (NHRTA) in 2007 with the goal of overseeing the development of commuter rail in the state. The proposed line would connect Lowell, Massachusetts, to Bedford, New Hampshire, with the end station being near the Manchester–Boston Regional Airport. As of November, 2022, an ongoing study by AECOM and the State of New Hampshire for design and financing is due to be completed by early 2023, and the project is awaiting federal funding. Nashua is proposed to have two station stops on the line, South Nashua, which would be located behind the Pheasant Lane Mall just north of the state line, and Nashua, which would be located in a rail yard near Crown Street in downtown Nashua and would utilize the existing Crown Street park-and-ride lot.

Separately, on October 11, 2017, the Nashua Board of Aldermen signed a memorandum of understanding with the now bankrupt Boston Surface Railroad Company for the creation of a rail line.

=== Firefighting ===
The fire department of Nashua, Nashua Fire, has 176 full-time members and is responsible for 31.9 square miles (83 km^{2}), protecting a population of 91,322. In the city, there are six stations. There is one fire chief, one assistant chief, and four deputy chiefs. The department has six engines, three ladder trucks, one hazmat/rescue truck (known as Special Hazards 1), two brush trucks, two spare engines, and one spare ladder truck. Nashua uses a private ambulance service, American Medical Response. The department has five fire commissioners. The commission has overall responsibility for the policy decisions, promotions, discipline, hiring and terminations. The fire chief reports directly to the commission. Their responsibility is to also work with fire administration with planning and prioritizing the department budget.

=== Health care ===
There are two hospitals in Nashua: St. Joseph Hospital and Southern New Hampshire Health System.

== In popular culture ==
An episode of MTV's MADE was filmed in 2004 at Nashua High School North.

Russian dressing was created in Nashua by James E. Colburn, likely in the 1910s.

In the American version of The Office, a branch of the fictional paper company Dunder Mifflin is located in Nashua and features in several episodes.

== Sister city ==
- Mysore, Karnataka, India

== See also ==
- Mine Falls Park
- Nashua River Rail Trail
- Greeley Park
