= Power canal =

Canal used for hydraulic power generation, not transport of watercraft

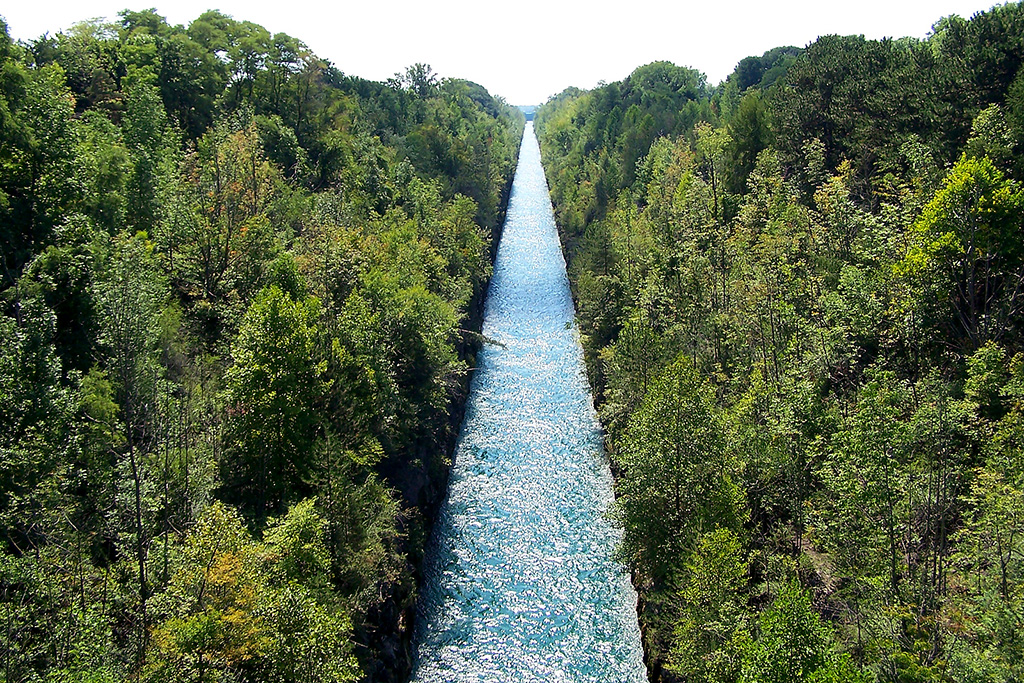
Queenston-Chippawa Power Canal conveying water to the Sir Adam Beck Hydroelectric Power Stations, Ontario, Canada,

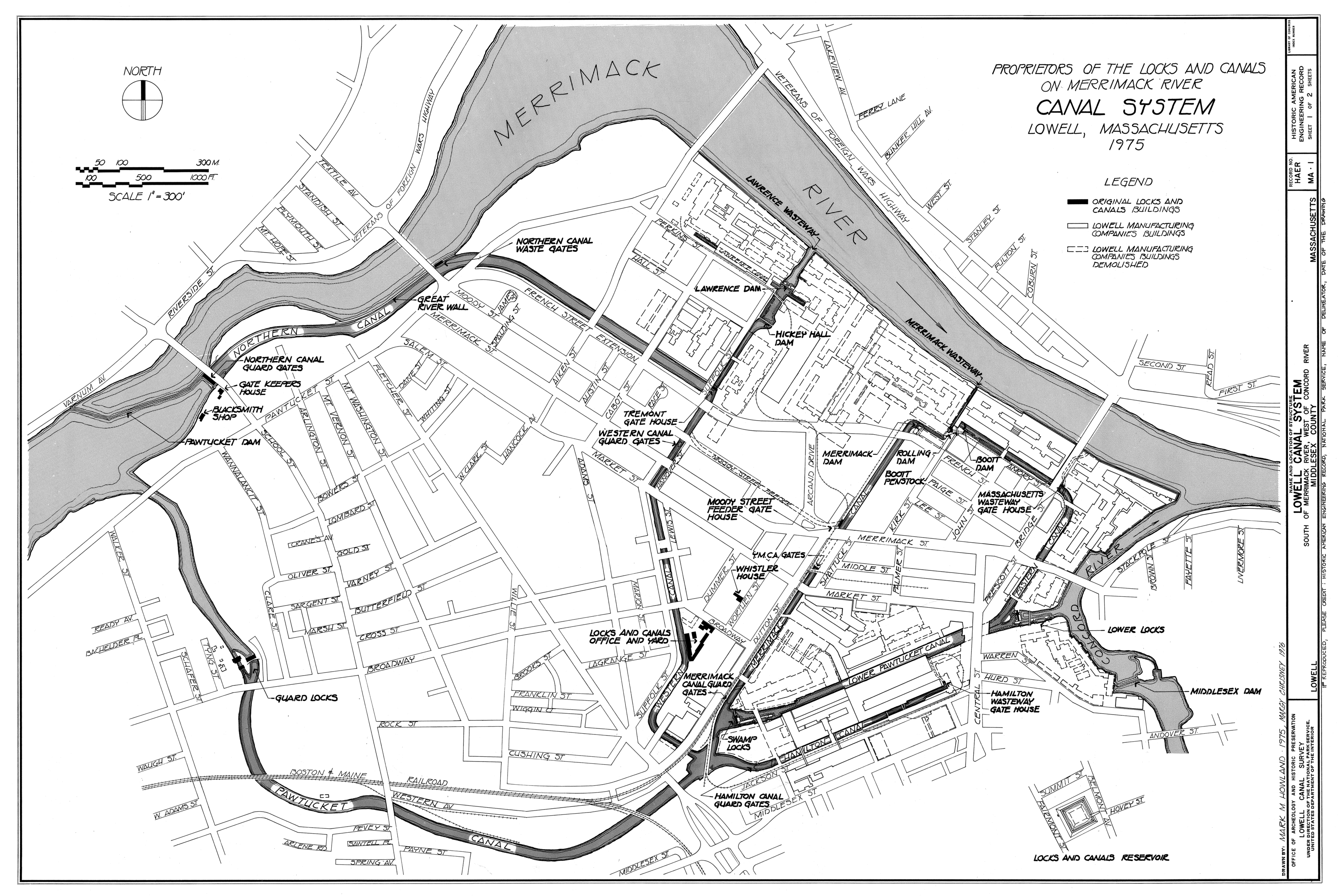
Map showing the system of canals used to power the textile mills of Lowell, Massachusetts. At left, water is diverted from the Merrimack river, and distributed out to several smaller canals (center and right)

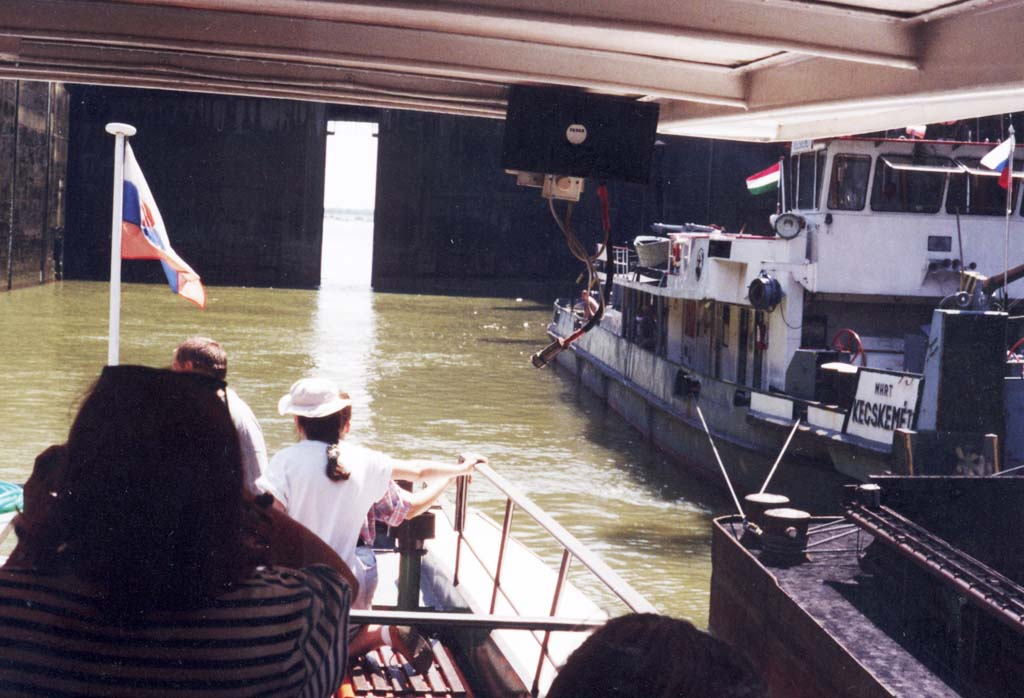
Sluice in the canal of Gabčíkovo Dam (Slovakia) - the canal is conveying water to a hydroelectric power station.

A power canal is a canal used for hydraulic power generation, rather than for transport of watercraft. The power canal was a major factor in the Industrial Revolution in New England in the 19th century. Most early power canals were mill races used mechanically to transfer power directly from falling water to machinery in mill buildings. Later, the hydraulic power generated electricity locally for the same mill factories. These power canals were often filled in as electricity (transported by power lines) replaced the need for local water power, and road transport needs or city expansion needs reclaimed the land. Some hydraulic power canals were transformed into local electric generators, but most were closed. Remains of power canals can be seen in old mill towns and are often protected as historical structures today.

== United States ==
=== California ===
- California Powder Works (1864-1914)

=== Maine ===
- Cumberland and Oxford Canal (1871-1905) was originally a transport canal from 1832

=== Massachusetts ===
- Holyoke Canal System (1827)
- Merrimack Canal (1820s)
- Lowell Power Canal System and Pawtucket Gatehouse (1821)
- Turners Falls Canal (1869) was originally a transport canal from 1798

=== Michigan ===
- Edison Sault Power Canal

=== New Hampshire ===
- Nashua power canal (1826), part of Mine Falls Park
- Amoskeag Falls power canal originally dug for transport in 1807

=== New York ===
- Niagara Falls Hydraulic Power and Manufacturing Company (1862)
- Rockland Mill Complex (c.1850)

=== Ohio ===
- Great Western Powder Works (1877)
