= Dunlap Building =

- U.S. National Register of Historic Places
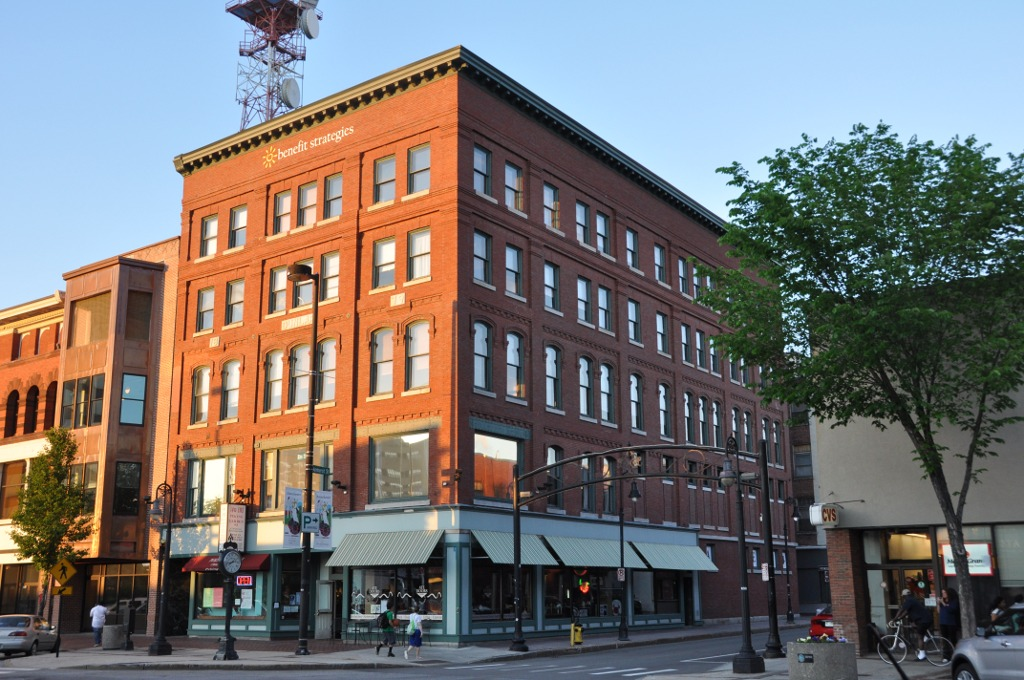

- Location within New Hampshire Location within the United States
- Location: 967 Elm St., Manchester, New Hampshire
- Coordinates: 42°59′30″N 71°27′48″W
- Area: less than one acre
- Built: 1879; 1908
- Built by: Mead, Mason & Company (1879); J. H. Mendell Company (1908)
- Architect: George W. Stevens (1879); Chase R. Whitcher (1908)
- Architectural style: Early Commercial
- NRHP reference No.: 04000587
- Added to NRHP: June 9, 2004

The Dunlap Building is a historic commercial building at 967 Elm Street in downtown Manchester, New Hampshire. It is a large five-story brick building occupying a corner lot on Manchester's principal commercial street. It was built in 1879 as a four-story building, and extensively rebuilt in 1908, when the fifth story was added. The first floor is lined by storefronts on both Elm and Amherst Streets. The second through fourth floors of the Elm Street facade are three bays wide, the bays divided by pilasters. Separate pilasters separate the bays on the top floor. The original second-floor windows were replaced in 1908 by large plate-glass windows. The third-floor windows have a segmented-arch top and the original 1879 window surrounds, although the windows themselves have been replaced by modern sash windows. The windows on the upper two floors are in rectangular openings with granite sills. The Amherst Street facade is also divided by pilasters and has similar window treatments, although a number of the second-floor windows have been partially bricked over.

The building was constructed in 1879 for Thomas Dunlap, on the site of one of Manchester's first large commercial buildings, which dated to the early 19th century. It was designed by local architect and engineer George W. Stevens. Architect John T. Fanning occupied an office on the third floor. Its fourth floor was originally occupied by the meeting hall of the International Order of Good Templars, a fraternal society. The building's 1908 alterations were designed by locally prominent architect Chase R. Whitcher, and notably introduced structural steel and styling derived from the increasing number of skyscrapers in major cities. Its elevator, also added in 1908, is a rare example of a retrofit; earlier elevators in Manchester were all designed into their buildings during construction. It was one of the most advanced office buildings of its time.

The building was listed on the National Register of Historic Places in 2004.

== See also ==
- National Register of Historic Places listings in Hillsborough County, New Hampshire
