= Old Post Office Block =

- U.S. National Register of Historic Places
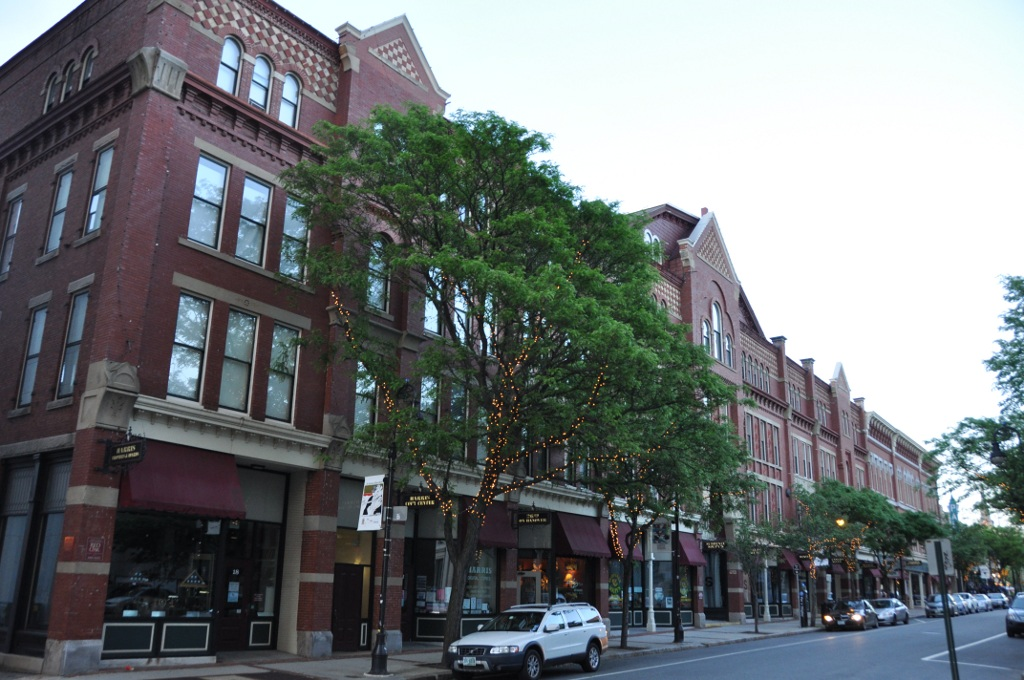
- Harrington-Smith block in the foreground, Old Post Office Block beyond

- Location within New Hampshire Location within the United States
- Location: 54-72 Hanover St., Manchester, New Hampshire
- Coordinates: 42°59′28″N 71°27′44″W
- Area: less than one acre
- Built: 1876
- Architectural style: Italianate, High Victorian Italianate
- NRHP reference No.: 86003364
- Added to NRHP: December 1, 1986

The Old Post Office Block is a historic commercial building at 54-72 Hanover Street in Manchester, New Hampshire. Built in 1876, it is a local landmark of Victorian Italianate commercial architecture, serving as the main post office, and as a newspaper publishing house for many years. The building was listed on the National Register of Historic Places in 1986.

== Description and history ==
The Old Post Office Block is located in Manchester's downtown business district, on the north side of Hanover Street between two other historic buildings, the Harrington-Smith Block (once home to the Strand Theater) and the Palace Theatre. It is three stories in height, built out of brick with a projecting bracketed cornice at the top of its facade. The facade is fifteen bays wide, divided into groups of five by brick pilasters. The outer groups have second-floor windows with peaked lintels, and third-floor windows with shouldered flat lintels. The central section windows are more elaborately finished, with some lancet-arched surrounds.

The block was constructed in 1876, built to serve both as a post office, and as home to the presses of the Mirror newspaper. It housed the newspaper operation until 1924, and the post office until 1891. In the mid-20th century it housed one of the city's largest department stores. The building's architect is not known, but may have been George W. Stevens, an engineer for the Amoskeag Mills, or Alpheus Gay, a builder who is credited with several high style Italianate buildings in the city, including his own house.

== See also ==
- National Register of Historic Places listings in Hillsborough County, New Hampshire
