= William M. Butterfield =

American architect

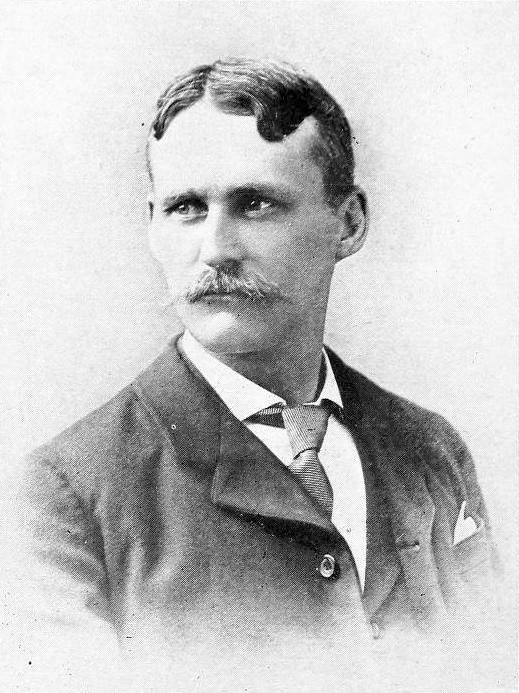
- Butterfield in 1896
- Born: October 22, 1860; Sidney, Maine, U.S.
- Died: June 6, 1932 (aged 71); Manchester, New Hampshire, U.S.
- Occupation: Architect
- Practice: Bodwell & Butterfield; William M. Butterfield; William M. Butterfield Company; Butterfield-Guertin Company

William M. Butterfield (October 22, 1860 – June 6, 1932) was an American architect from New Hampshire.

== Early life and education ==
Butterfield was born October 22, 1860, in Sidney, Maine. His father, Chesmon Butterfield, was a carpenter and builder. The family moved to Waterville in 1871, when young Butterfield was 11 years old. At that time, his father established himself as an architect as well as a builder. He trained with his father and, at the age of 16, took a job with Foster & Dutton, a Waterville contracting firm with a statewide reputation. He quickly rose through the ranks, and by the age of 17 was supervising the construction of large structures, most notably a major expansion in 1879 of the Hotel Wentworth in New Castle.

== Career ==
In 1880, he established himself as a contractor in Concord, Massachusetts, but moved in 1881 to Manchester, New Hampshire, to open an architect's office.

Upon his arrival, he formed a partnership with Albert E. Bodwell, who would later become Edward Dow's head designer. The partnership, Bodwell & Butterfield, had been dissolved by September. Butterfield remained in private practice for the duration of the 19th century. In about 1907 he took his son Clinton C. Butterfield and Parker K. Weston into the firm, which became the William M. Butterfield Company. By 1920, Butterfield was managing the practice alone. In 1924 Butterfield formed a partnership with architect Jean-Noël Guertin. The firm was known as the Butterfield-Guertin Company and lasted until 1927, after which Butterfield resumed his private practice until his death in 1932. During his final years, his chief associate was Norris W. Corey. Corey would be Butterfield's successor, and practiced until his retirement in the 1970s. Among Corey's designs is the Town Hall of Goffstown, New Hampshire, built in 1947.

== Personal life ==
Butterfield was married twice. First in 1882 to Rose E. Annis of Peterborough. She died in 1884, not long after giving birth to their son, Clinton Chesmon Butterfield. He married again in 1885, to Belle Knox of Manchester.

Butterfield died June 6, 1932, in Manchester.

== Legacy ==
Butterfield was the leading architect in Manchester and New Hampshire from about the 1890s until the time of World War I. During that period he was highly sought after as a designer of town halls, courthouses, churches, and other public and private buildings.

During the 1880s Butterfield employed John F. Stanton, who would go on to be a noted architect in Topeka, Kansas.

At least nine of his designs have been placed on the United States National Register of Historic Places, and many others contribute to listed historic districts.

== Architectural works ==
Year	Building	Address	City	State	Notes	Image	Reference
1881	Farmington Town Hall	356 Main St	Farmington	New Hampshire	Highly altered.		
1882	House for Freeman Higgins	537 Pine St	Manchester	New Hampshire			
1882	House for Charles Morrill	1799 Elm St	Manchester	New Hampshire			
1882	Peoples' M. E. Church	60 Pennacook St	Manchester	New Hampshire			
1882	St. Paul's M. E. Church	Union and Amherst Sts	Manchester	New Hampshire	Demolished.		
1885	Central Police Station	Manchester and Central Sts	Manchester	New Hampshire	Demolished.		
1886	Hollis Town Hall	7 Monument Sq	Hollis	New Hampshire	Listed on the United States National Register of Historic Places in 2001 as part of the Hollis Village Historic District.		
1886	Swedish Evangelical; Lutheran Gethsemane Church	65 Sagamore St	Manchester	New Hampshire			
1888	Beth Eden Baptist Church	82 Maple St	Waltham	Massachusetts	Listed on the United States National Register of Historic Places in 1989.		
1888	Fire Station No. 5	44 Webster St	Manchester	New Hampshire	Demolished in 1993.		
1888	House for Hosea B. Burnham	74 Brook St	Manchester	New Hampshire			
1888	House for Nelson S. Whitman	263 Main St	Nashua	New Hampshire			
1889	Goffstown Town Hall	216 Main St	Goffstown	New Hampshire	Burned in 1937.		
1889	Immanuel M. E. Church	545 Moody St	Waltham	Massachusetts			
1889	Pittsfield High School (former)	85 Main St	Pittsfield	New Hampshire	Listed on the United States National Register of Historic Places in 1980 as part of the Pittsfield Center Historic District. Now the Town Hall.		
1890	Goffstown Congregational Church	8 Main St	Goffstown	New Hampshire	Listed on the United States National Register of Historic Places in 1996.		
1891	First Baptist Church	298 Blackstone St	Woonsocket	Rhode Island			
1891	Odd Fellows Building	142 Main St	Nashua	New Hampshire			
1891	House for John Butler Smith	62 School St	Hillsborough	New Hampshire	Listed on the United States National Register of Historic Places in 2002.		
1891	House for Roger G. Sullivan	168 Walnut St	Manchester	New Hampshire	Listed on the United States National Register of Historic Places in 2004.		
1892	Franklin City Hall	316 Central St	Franklin	New Hampshire	Listed on the United States National Register of Historic Places in 1982 as part of the Franklin Falls Historic District.		
1892	Kennard Block	1008 Elm St	Manchester	New Hampshire	Burned in 1902.		
1892	Monadnock Block	1140-1160 Elm St	Manchester	New Hampshire	Demolished in 1987.		
1892	Nesmith Hall	University of New Hampshire	Durham	New Hampshire	Highly altered.		
1892	Pittsfield Academy	5 Park St	Pittsfield	New Hampshire	Listed on the United States National Register of Historic Places in 1980 as part of the Pittsfield Center Historic District.		
1892	Smith and Dow Block	1426-1470 Elm St	Manchester	New Hampshire	Listed on the United States National Register of Historic Places in 2002.		
1892	Varick Building	815 Elm St	Manchester	New Hampshire	Rebuilt after a 1914 fire.		
1892	Weston, Hill & Fitts Building	1061 Elm St	Manchester	New Hampshire			
1893	Bank Building	20 W Park St	Lebanon	New Hampshire	Listed on the United States National Register of Historic Places in 1986 as part of the Colburn Park Historic District.		
1893	Belknap County Courthouse	64 Court St	Laconia	New Hampshire			
1893	Pumping Station	Oak Hill Reservoir	Manchester	New Hampshire	Demolished.		
1893	"Wildwood Hall" for George H. Moore	506 Moore Hill Rd	Newbury	Vermont	Listed on the United States National Register of Historic Places in 1978.		
1894	Hillsborough County Buildings (former)	329 Mast Rd	Goffstown	New Hampshire	Originally home to Hillsborough County's social services, now used for courts and offices.		
1894	Pearl Street School	Pearl St	Manchester	New Hampshire			
1895	Acquilla Building	3 Pleasant St	Concord	New Hampshire	Listed on the United States National Register of Historic Places in 2000 as part of the Downtown Concord Historic District.		
1895	Calumet Club	126 Lowell St	Manchester	New Hampshire	Altered.		
1895	Weston Terrace	70 Lowell St	Manchester	New Hampshire			
1896	Manchester Central High School	207 Lowell St	Manchester	New Hampshire			
1896	House for George E. Gould	2321 Elm St	Manchester	New Hampshire			
1896	Stone Memorial Building	N Stark Hwy	Weare	New Hampshire			
1897	Adams Free Library	92 Park St	Adams	Massachusetts			
1897	John M. Hunt Home	334 Main St	Nashua	New Hampshire			
1899	Globe Congregational Church	340 S Main St	Woonsocket	Rhode Island			
1899	Nurses' Residence	New Hampshire State Hospital (former)	Concord	New Hampshire			
1901	Josiah Carpenter Library	41 Main St	Pittsfield	New Hampshire	Listed on the United States National Register of Historic Places in 1980 as part of the Pittsfield Center Historic District.		
1902	Academie Notre Dame	372 Beech St	Manchester	New Hampshire			
1902	Batchelder Street School (former)	12 Batchelder St	Laconia	New Hampshire			
1902	House for Alonzo H. Weston	2241 Elm St	Manchester	New Hampshire			
1902	Newport Academy and Graded School	School St	Newport	Vermont	Demolished.		
1902	Washington Street School (former)	72 Washington St	Laconia	New Hampshire			
1903	Beacon Building	814 Elm St	Manchester	New Hampshire			
1903	Chutter Block	43 Main St	Littleton	New Hampshire			
1903	Littleton Bank Building	76 Main St	Littleton	New Hampshire	Demolished.		
1903	New Hampshire Masonic Home	813 Beech St	Manchester	New Hampshire			
1903	Waterville Savings Bank Building	165 Main St	Waterville	Maine	Listed on the United States National Register of Historic Places in 2014 as part of the Waterville Main Street Historic District.		
1904	Pembroke Academy	209 Academy Rd	Suncook	New Hampshire	Burned in 1936.		
1904	Sphinx Tomb	Dartmouth College	Hanover	New Hampshire	Listed on the United States National Register of Historic Places in 2005.		
1905	Hillsborough County Courthouse (former)	Market St	Manchester	New Hampshire	Presently the City Hall Annex.		
1905	Thayer Building	New Hampshire State Hospital (former)	Concord	New Hampshire			
1906	South Grammar School	38 Gold St	Waterville	Maine			
1907	Chapel	Pine Grove Cemetery	Waterville	Maine			
1908	Concord State Armory (former)	39 Green St	Concord	New Hampshire	Listed on the United States National Register of Historic Places in 1983 as part of the Concord Civic District.		
1908	Hussey Block	185 Main St	Waterville	Maine			
1908	Elmwood Hotel addition	211 Main St	Waterville	Maine			
1909	Y. M. C. A. Building	30 Mechanic St	Manchester	New Hampshire			
1910	First M. E. Church	961 Valley St	Manchester	New Hampshire			
1913	Saidel Apartments	238 Pearl St	Manchester	New Hampshire			
1915	House for David W. Anderson	523 Beacon St	Manchester	New Hampshire			
1915	Holy Trinity Cathedral	166 Pearl St	Manchester	New Hampshire			
1916	Oscar Foss Memorial Library	111 S Barnstead Rd	Barnstead	New Hampshire	Listed on the United States National Register of Historic Places in 1985.		
1920	Franklin Street School	255 Franklin St	Manchester	New Hampshire	Demolished.		
1921	City Guaranty Savings Bank Building	119 Main St	Nashua	New Hampshire	Later known as the Old Guaranty National Bank. Altered.		
1921	LaFlamme Apartments	10 Prospect St	Manchester	New Hampshire			
1924	Aaron Cutler Memorial Library	269 Charles Bancroft Hwy	Litchfield	New Hampshire			
1925	Brewer High School (former)	5 Somerset St	Brewer	Maine	Listed on the United States National Register of Historic Places in 2014.		
1927	Berlin State Armory (former)	135 Green St	Berlin	New Hampshire			
