= Carpenter and Bean Block =

- U.S. National Register of Historic Places
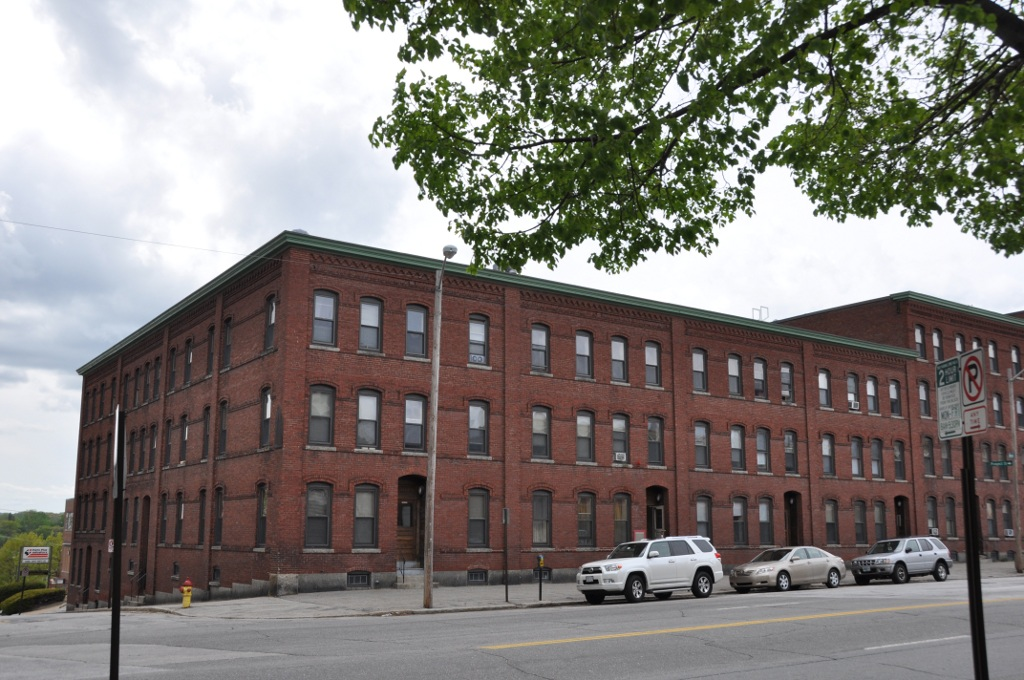

- Location within New Hampshire Location within the United States
- Location: 1382-1414 Elm St., Manchester, New Hampshire
- Coordinates: 42°59′52″N 71°27′53″W
- Area: 0.9 acres (0.36 ha)
- Built: 1882
- Built by: Bean, Nehemiah; Carpenter, Josiah
- Architect: Fanning, J.T.
- Architectural style: Italianate
- NRHP reference No.: 02001548
- Added to NRHP: December 13, 2002

The Carpenter and Bean Block is a historic apartment house at 1382-1414 Elm Street in Manchester, New Hampshire. Built in 1883 and enlarged in the 1890s, it is a well-preserved example of a late Italianate brick tenement building. The building was listed on the National Register of Historic Places in 2002.

== Description and history ==
The Carpenter and Bean Block is located at the northern end of downtown Manchester, at the northwest corner of Elm and Dow Streets. It is a large, roughly L-shaped brick building, which was built in two stages. The first section, built in 1883, is a three-story sixteen-bay structure with vernacular Italianate styling. In 1892 a four-story section, seven bays wide, was added which has similar styling. The bays are grouped in fours, each separated by a strip of brick that rises the height of the building. Each section has a recessed entry, with a segmented arch overhead, and granite steps, wrought iron railing, and iron bootscrapers.

The building was built as an investment property by Josiah Carpenter and Nehemiah Bean, prominent local businessmen and real estate developers. The land originally belonged to the Amoskeag Manufacturing Company, and was sold to Carpenter and Bean with the constraint that construction be of brick. It was designed by John T. Fanning, a prominent local architect with a number of significant regional industrial and residential commissions. It is his only known example of a tenement house. The building underwent a certified historic rehabilitation in 2001.

== See also ==
- Smith and Dow Block, next door
- National Register of Historic Places listings in Hillsborough County, New Hampshire
