= District C =

Historic district in New Hampshire, United States

- U.S. National Register of Historic Places
- U.S. Historic district
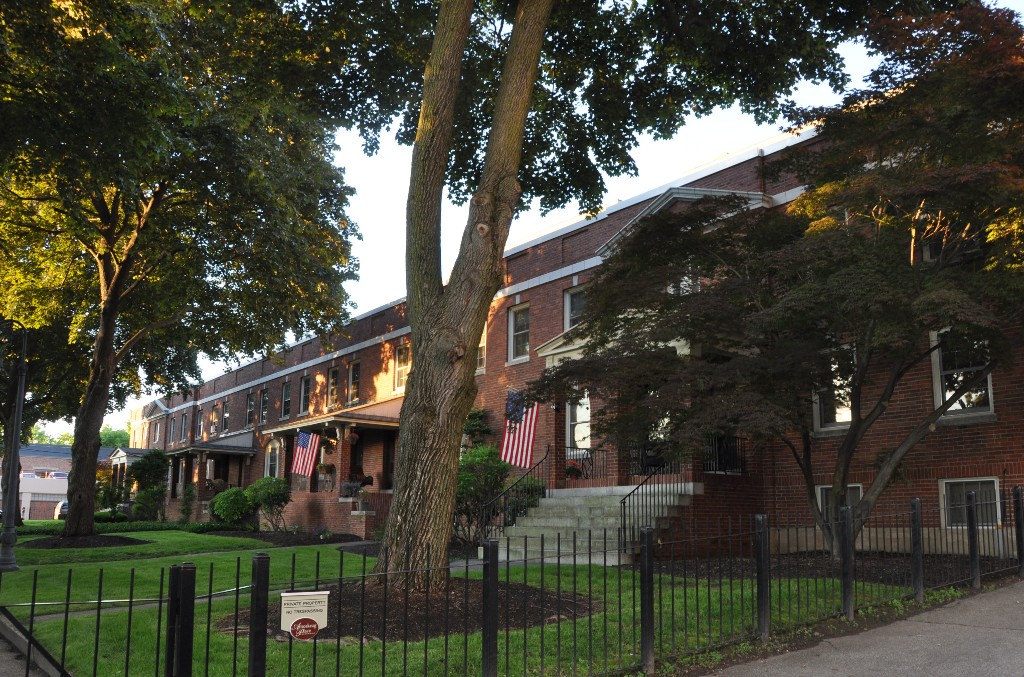
- Front view of a typical rowhouse in the district

- Location within New Hampshire Location within the United States
- Location: Roughly bounded by N. Hampshire Lane, Hollis, Canal, and Bridge Sts., Manchester, New Hampshire
- Coordinates: 42°59′43″N 71°27′55″W
- Area: 5 acres (2 ha)
- Built: 1881
- Architect: George W. Stevens (1881)
- MPS: Amoskeag Manufacturing Company Housing Districts TR
- NRHP reference No.: 82000620
- Added to NRHP: November 12, 1982

District C is a historic worker housing district located in Manchester, New Hampshire, near the former Amoskeag Manufacturing Company millyard, and surrounding area. It is roughly bounded by N. Hampshire Lane, Hollis, Canal, and Bridge streets, and was added to the National Register of Historic Places on November 12, 1982. It originally contained nine rowhouses in an area of approximately 5 acres (2 ha); three have subsequently been demolished and replaced by an apartment complex.

== Description and history ==
District C is a roughly rectangular area, located east of the mills formerly of the Amoskeag Manufacturing Company lining the eastern bank of the Merrimack River, and west of Elm Street, the city's principal commercial thoroughfare. It is bounded on the north by Hollis Street, on the east by North Hampshire Lane, and on the west by Canal Street. Five of the six surviving buildings in the district are north of Kidder Street, while one is between Kidder and Bridge Street. The three demolished buildings were located east of the latter building. Each of the buildings in the district is a rowhouse, set with a north-south orientation. Each is 2½ stories in height, built out of brick, and has four units. They are covered by dormered hip roofs, and entrances are set in pairs under Stick style hoods. At the rear of each unit is a two-story projection with a porch.

Four of the district's nine blocks were built in 1881 by the Amoskeag Company, and are the survivors of seven originally built at that time to a design by the company's civil engineer, George W. Stevens. Three of these have since been demolished. The other five were built in 1916 as overseer housing, and were the last group of housing to be built by the company. They were converted into condominiums in the 1970s.

== See also ==
- National Register of Historic Places listings in Hillsborough County, New Hampshire
- District A
- District B
- District D
- District E
