= George W. Stevens =

American architect (1834–1897)

- Born: October 1, 1834; Andover, Massachusetts, U.S.
- Died: September 30, 1897 (aged 62); Cordova, Alabama, U.S.
- Occupations: Civil engineer; architect
- Spouse: Anna Maria Annan (m. 1864)

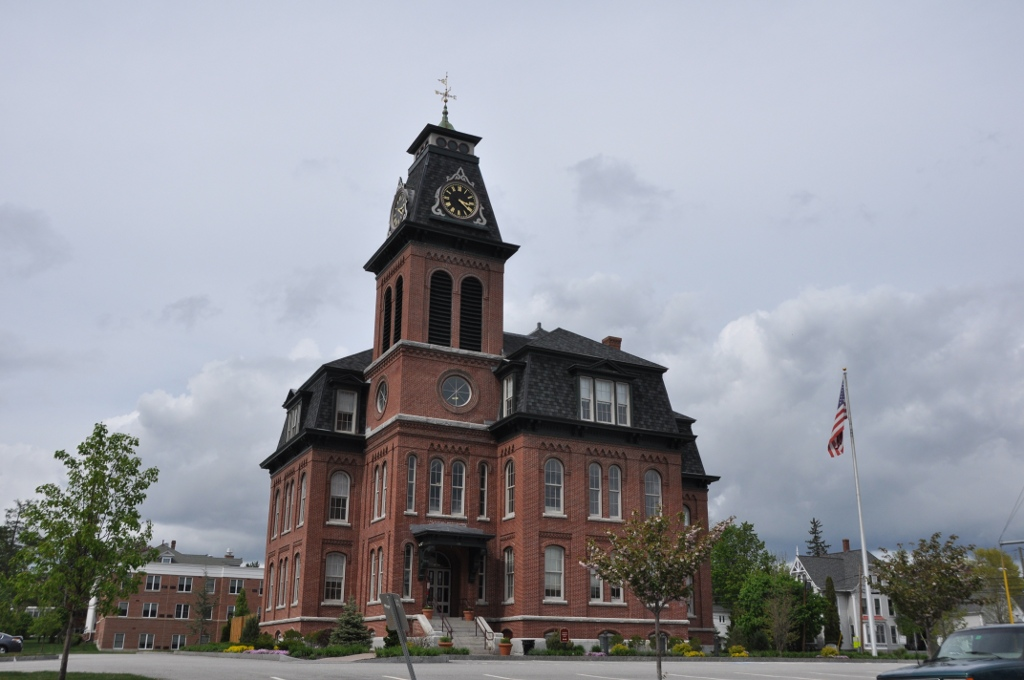
Ash Street School, Manchester, New Hampshire, 1872-74

George W. Stevens (October 1, 1834 – September 30, 1897) was an American civil engineer and architect practicing in Manchester, New Hampshire, during the nineteenth century.

== Life and career ==
George W. Stevens was born October 1, 1834, in Andover, Massachusetts, to Phinehas Stevens (1800–1864). Phinehas Stevens was a millwright and built the New Mills of the Amoskeag Manufacturing Company in 1841, among other mills in New England.

Stevens is first listed in the Manchester directories in 1866, as a civil engineer. By 1879 he was also noted in the directories as an architect, though he was employed as an architect as early as the late 1860s. He lived in Manchester for about forty years, for eighteen of which he was employed as chief civil engineer for the Amoskeag Manufacturing Company. In 1892 Stevens left Manchester to join Lockwood, Greene & Company as superintendent of construction for their southern mills. He remained in this position for five years, living in the South. Stevens died in Cordova, Alabama, on September 30, 1897.

== Personal life ==
Stevens was married in 1864 to Anna Maria Annan (1837–1927) of Manchester.

Augustus G. Stevens (1829–1901), elder brother of George W., was also an architect and engineer in Manchester, and designed the Hoyt Shoe Factory in 1892.

== Legacy ==
At least three buildings attributed to Stevens have been listed on the United States National Register of Historic Places, and another contributes to a listed historic district.

== Works ==
- Manchester City Library (former), Manchester, New Hampshire (1869–71, demolished)
- Lincoln Street School, (Note: Demolished to build Enright Park.) Manchester, New Hampshire (1871, demolished)
- Ash Street School, Manchester, New Hampshire (1872–74, NRHP-listed 1975)
- Old Post Office Block, (Note: The architect of the Post Office Block is not documented, but Stevens is suggested as the most likely designer.) Manchester, New Hampshire (1876, NRHP-listed 1986)
- Central Fire Station, Manchester, New Hampshire (1877, demolished 1971)
- Dunlap Building, Manchester, New Hampshire (1879, NRHP-listed 2004)
- House for George W. Stevens, (Note: The house Stevens built for his family still stands at 1819 Elm Street.) Manchester, New Hampshire (1879)
- Amory Mill, Amoskeag Millyard, Manchester, New Hampshire (1880)
- Housing for the Amoskeag Manufacturing Company, (Note: Stevens designed four rows of houses for the company in 1881, one of which remains as a contributing resource to District C of the Amoskeag Manufacturing Company Housing Districts, NRHP-listed in 1982.) Manchester, New Hampshire (1881, partially extant)
- Bakersville School, Manchester, New Hampshire (1883, demolished)
- Chimney, (Note: At 255 feet (78 m) tall, this chimney was the tallest structure in Manchester prior to its demolition.) Amoskeag Millyard, Manchester, New Hampshire (1883, demolished 1955)
- Peoples' Baptist Church, Manchester, New Hampshire (1888, demolished)

== Gallery of works ==
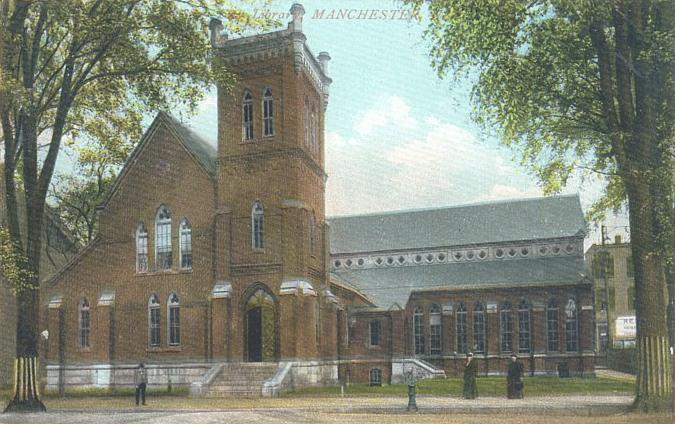
Manchester City Library (former), Manchester, New Hampshire, 1869

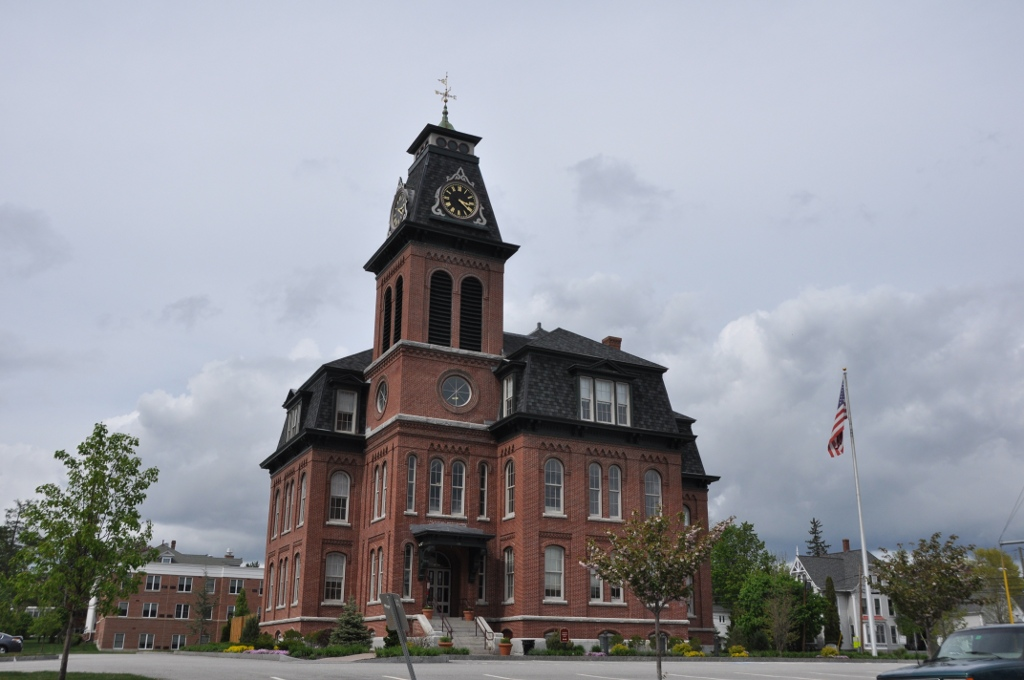
Ash Street School, Manchester, New Hampshire, 1872-74

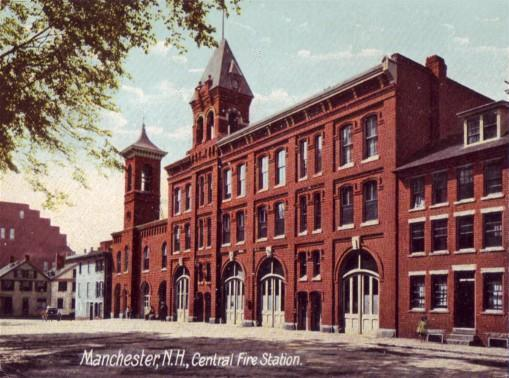
Central Fire Station, Manchester, New Hampshire, 1877

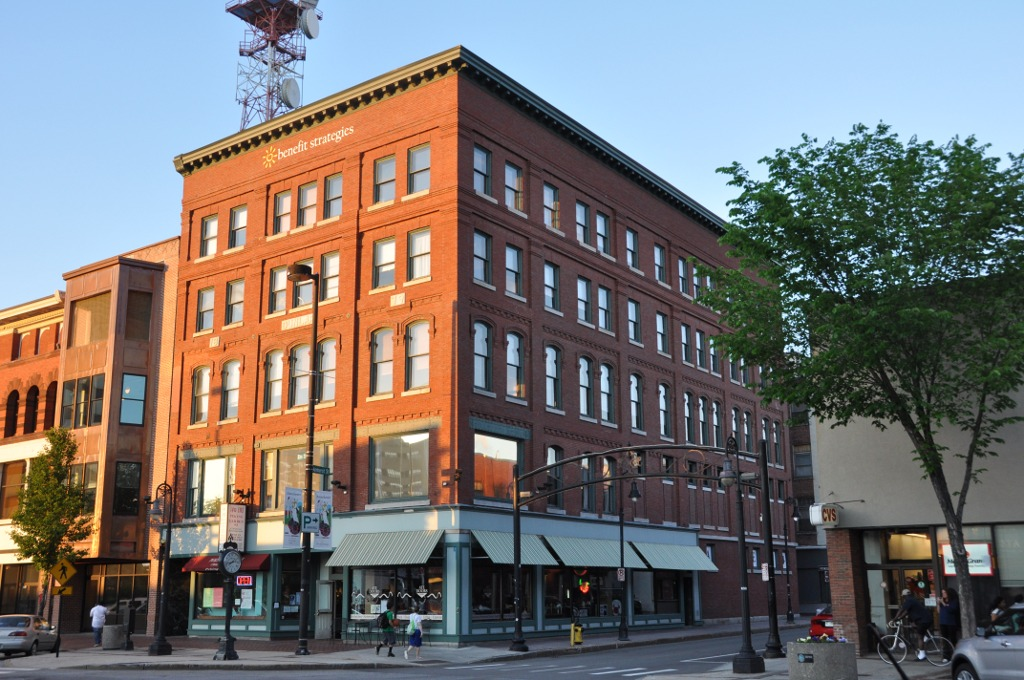
Dunlap Building, Manchester, New Hampshire, 1879

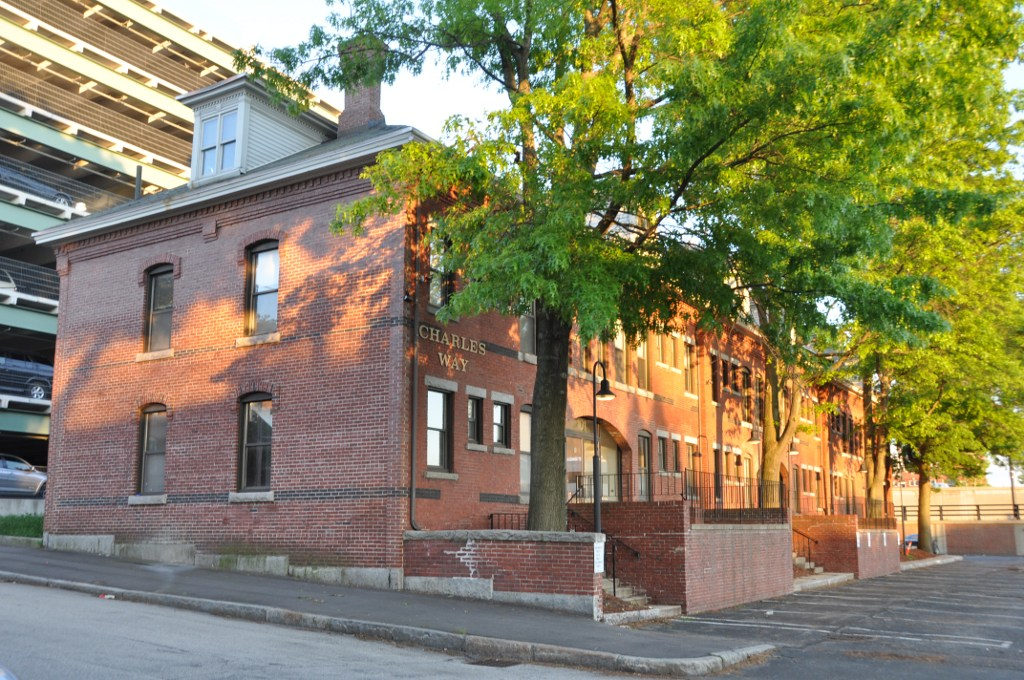
Housing for the Amoskeag Manufacturing Company, Manchester, New Hampshire, 1881

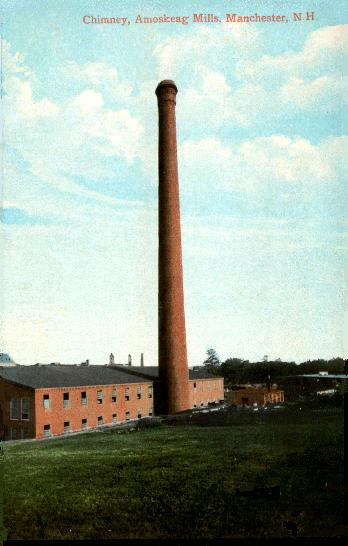
Chimney, Amoskeag Millyard, Manchester, New Hampshire, 1883
