= Ash Street School (Manchester, New Hampshire) =

- U.S. National Register of Historic Places
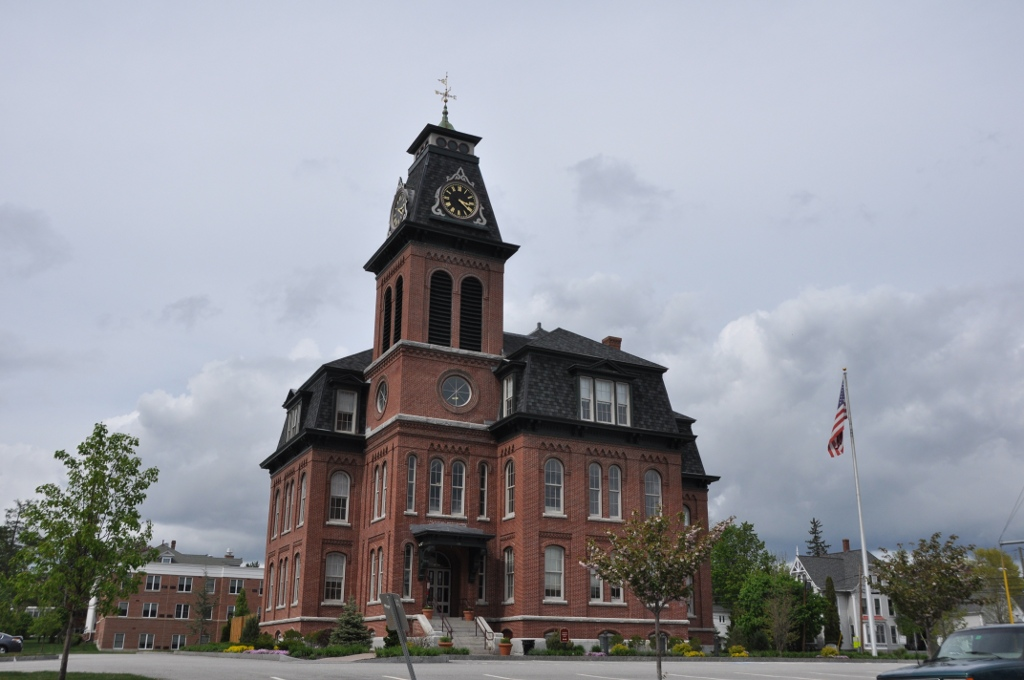

- Location within New Hampshire Location within the United States
- Location: Bounded by Ash, Bridge, Maple, and Pearl Sts. Manchester, New Hampshire
- Coordinates: 42°59′46″N 71°27′17″W
- Area: 1 acre (0.40 ha)
- Built: 1872-74
- Built by: Alpheus Gay; Gilman H. Kimball; Mead & Mason
- Architect: George W. Stevens
- Architectural style: Second Empire
- NRHP reference No.: 75000232
- Added to NRHP: May 30, 1975

The Ash Street School is a historic schoolhouse in Manchester, New Hampshire. It has been listed on the National Register of Historic Places since 1975. The school occupies the city block bounded by Ash, Bridge, Maple, and Pearl Streets.

== Description ==
The school building is a French style Second Empire three-story brick building. Its windows are tall and narrow with rounded tops and are slightly recessed from the facade in a square niche; the window niches on the second floor have a further decorative brickwork border on top. The building's most prominent feature is its clock tower that rises four stories and is topped by a mansard roof.

Building of the 13,800-square-foot (1,280 m^{2}) schoolhouse took place in 1872 and 1874. It was finally completed and dedicated in 1874. The Amoskeag Company paid only .04 cents per square foot for the empty lot back in 1869.

The building was designed by George W. Stevens, civil engineer for the Amoskeag Company. The foundation was built by Gilman H. Kendall, the walls and roof by Alpheus Gay, and interior finish by Mead & Mason of Concord.

A model of the building won a gold medal for its innovative design at the Philadelphia Centennial Exposition in 1876. The shape of the building was designed to be that of a Greek cross, with arms 88 feet (27 m) long and 32 feet (9.8 m) wide. Each arm is aligned on the property so that each end faces one of the principal directions. All original classrooms (eight in total) had windows on three sides to allow light and adequate ventilation. The building was the first in the country with this design style.

The clock tower is 112 feet (34 m) high. The bell alone within the clock tower weighs 2,100 pounds (950 kg).

The current owner, Nick Soggu, owner and founder of SilverTech, purchased the building for his corporation in November 2007.

== See also ==
- National Register of Historic Places listings in Hillsborough County, New Hampshire
