= Oscar Foss Memorial Library =

- U.S. National Register of Historic Places
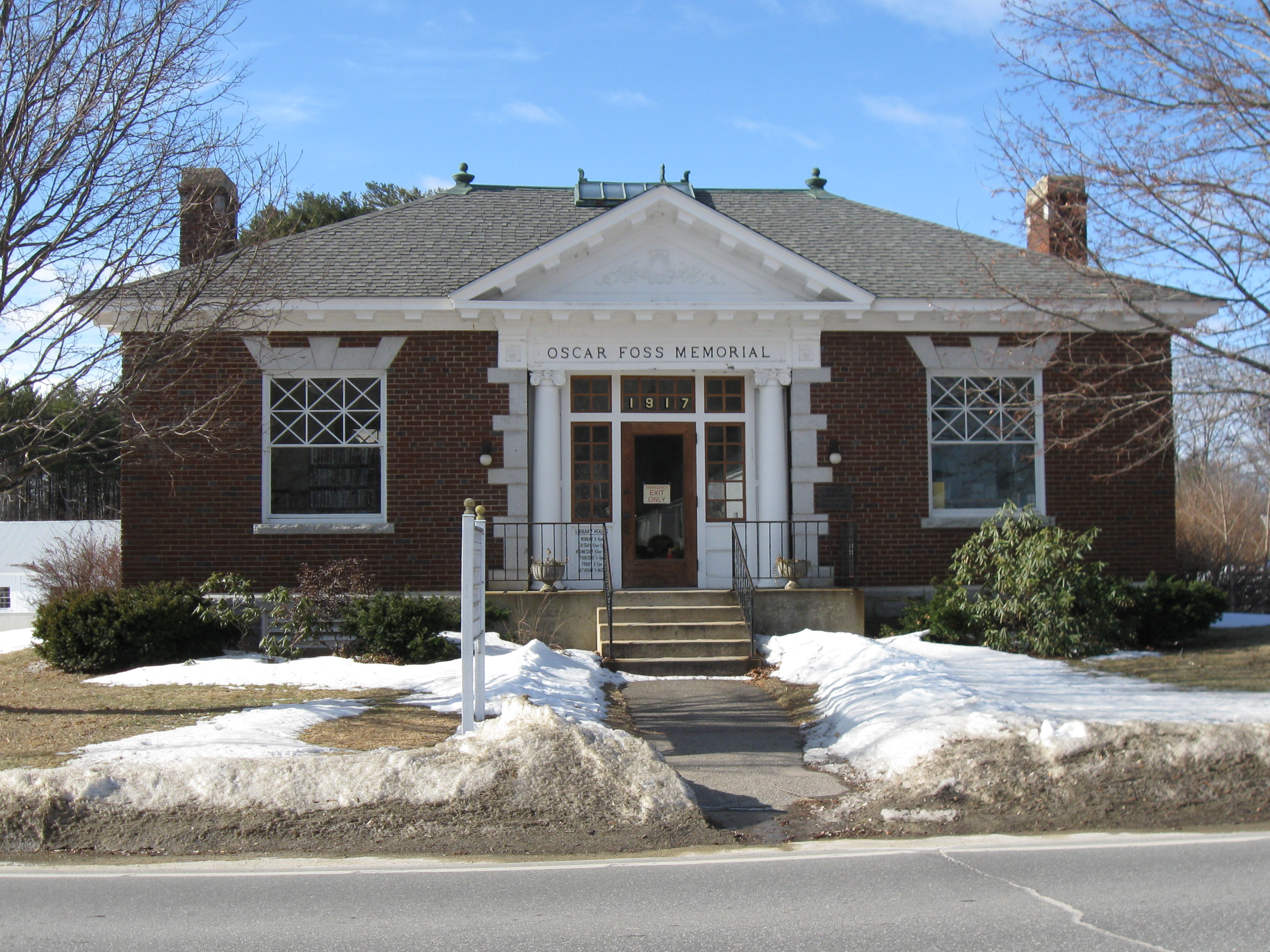

- Location within New Hampshire Location within the United States
- Location: Main St., Barnstead, New Hampshire
- Coordinates: 43°20′21″N 71°15′38″W
- Area: 0.2 acres (0.081 ha)
- Built: 1916
- Built by: Leon F. Batchelder
- Architect: William M. Butterfield Company
- Architectural style: Classical Revival
- NRHP reference No.: 85002779
- Added to NRHP: November 7, 1985

The Oscar Foss Memorial Library is the public library of Barnstead, New Hampshire. It is located in the center of town at 111 South Barnstead Road, in a single-story Colonial Revival building (listed on the National Register of Historic Places) designed by the William M. Butterfield Company of Manchester and built in 1916-17. The library was a gift of Sarah Foss in memory of her husband Oscar, a prominent local businessman who died in 1913.

== Architecture and history ==
The Oscar Foss Memorial Library is one of several municipal buildings lining South Barnstead Road in the village of Center Barnstead; it is located on the west side of the street, opposite the town hall and Congregational church. It is a single-story masonry structure, built out of brick with trim of wood and stone, and is covered by a hip roof with copper finials at the peak. It is three bays wide and two deep, with a central entrance set in a recess below a pedimented gable studded with modillion blocks. The recess has flanking columns and corner quoins. The windows on either side of the entry are topped by splayed stone lintels with keystones, and have upper sashes divided into triangular panes. The interior is organized with the main reading room to the left, the former town offices to the right, and a traditional central librarian's desk in the center.

The town of Barnstead voted in 1892 to establish a public library. It was at first housed either in private homes or stores and was at one point divided into small collections located in each of the town's four villages. The collection was consolidated into one room of a private house in Center Barnstead in 1906, with the need for a permanent home apparent. This building was given to the town by Sarah Foss, in memory of her husband, and was dedicated in 1917. It was designed by William M. Butterfield, an architect based in Manchester, and is one of the finest examples of Classical Revival architecture in the New Hampshire Lakes Region. It was largely unaltered until 1970, when the basement was finished for use as a community space. In 1979 the town offices moved out, and the space was adapted as a children's reading room, with woodwork and shelving carefully matched to the existing finishes. A major modern addition was made to the rear of the building in 2000.

== See also ==
- National Register of Historic Places listings in Belknap County, New Hampshire
