= District E =

Historic district in New Hampshire, United States

- U.S. National Register of Historic Places
- U.S. Historic district
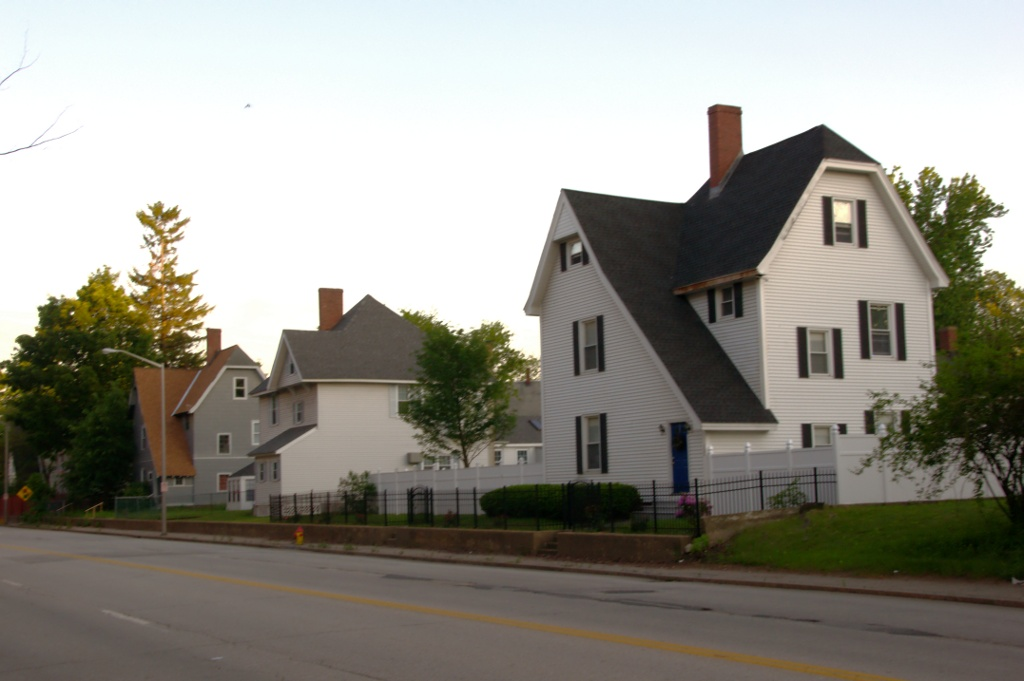
- Three typical houses in the district

- Location within New Hampshire Location within the United States
- Location: 258-322 McGregor St., Manchester, New Hampshire
- Coordinates: 42°59′40″N 71°28′27″W
- Area: 1.3 acres (0.53 ha)
- Built: 1881
- MPS: Amoskeag Manufacturing Company Housing Districts TR
- NRHP reference No.: 82000622
- Added to NRHP: November 12, 1982

District E is a historic worker housing district in Manchester, New Hampshire, near the former Amoskeag Manufacturing Company millyard, at 258-322 McGregor Street on the west bank of the Merrimack River. It consists of five single-family houses, built in 1882 for overseers at the mills. It was added to the National Register of Historic Places on November 12, 1982.

== Description and history ==
District E is located near the west portion of the historic former Amoskeag millyard, once one of the largest textile manufacturing companies in the world. It is located on the west side of McGregor Street, just north of the Notre Dame Bridge. The district consists of five wood-frame houses, built to two different plans. All are 2½ stories in height, and were originally finished with wooden clapboards. Architecturally they are best described as Stick style structures, with varying roof lines and projecting sections. Each has a single-story kitchen ell, and originally also had a carriage barn at the rear of the property.

When the Amoskeag Company mills were first developed in the 1830s and 1840s, housing for overseers and supervisors was typically of brick construction, and set above (and further from the mill than) the more tenement-style housing of the workers. These were all located on the east side of the river, and the first mills built on the west side did not have associated worker housing. These five houses were built in 1889 to address a need for supervisor housing in those mills. They originally had a view of the river, which was obscured by the construction of the Coolidge Mill in 1909.

== See also ==
- National Register of Historic Places listings in Hillsborough County, New Hampshire
- District A
- District B
- District C
- District D
