= District A =

Historic district in New Hampshire, United States

- U.S. National Register of Historic Places
- U.S. Historic district
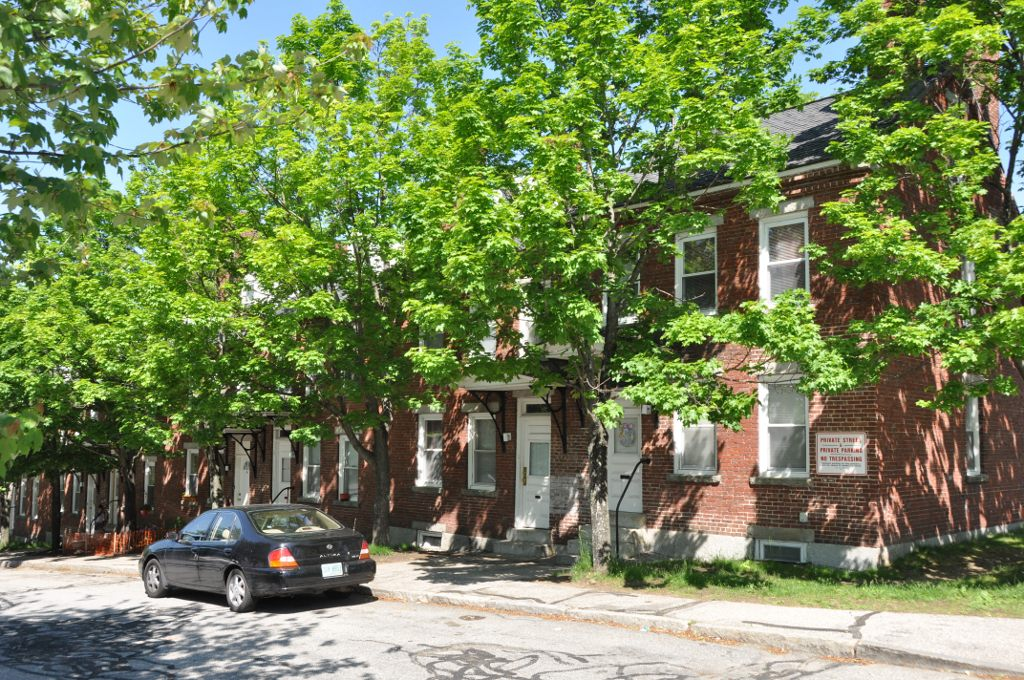
- Row housing facing Granite Street in the district

- Location within New Hampshire Location within the United States
- Location: Bounded by Pleasant, State, Granite, and Bedford Sts., Manchester, New Hampshire
- Coordinates: 42°59′14″N 71°28′5″W
- Area: 6 acres (2.4 ha)
- Architectural style: Greek Revival
- MPS: Amoskeag Manufacturing Company Housing Districts TR
- NRHP reference No.: 82000618
- Added to NRHP: November 12, 1982

District A is a historic worker housing district located in Manchester, New Hampshire, near the former Amoskeag Manufacturing Company millyard. It is bounded by Pleasant, State, Granite, and Bedford streets, and includes seven surviving tenement blocks (out of ten) built by Amoskeag between 1843 and 1852. The district was added to the National Register of Historic Places on November 12, 1982.

== Description and history ==
District A is a roughly rectangular area, about 6 acres (2.4 ha) in size, located between mill buildings lining the east bank of the Merrimack River and downtown Manchester. It consists of seven brick tenement blocks, either 2½ or 3½ stories in height, housing either six or ten units. Six of them are arrayed around a central courtyard bounded on the long sides by Bedford and State streets, while the seventh is parallel to the southernmost of the other blocks, facing Granite Street. They are all built with load-bearing brick walls, with granite window sills and lintels. Entrance treatments are typically late 19th or early 20th-century in style. The buildings are capped by gabled roofs, with paired chimneys at the ends and in between units. On some of the blocks, the end chimneys are joined by a brick curtain wall.

The Manchester Mills Company was organized in 1839 for the production of printed worsted-weight fabrics, and began operations in 1846. Soon afterward, four tenement blocks (including two that survive) were built near the southern end of the mill yard, between the two power canals (now Commercial and Canal streets), for workers employed in the printery, while another four (including three that survive) were built near the northern end of the mill. After the company built its Mill Number 2 in 1850, the two north-south tenements forming the courtyard were added. Of these ten blocks, one on the north side was demolished in 1862 and two on the south side were demolished in 1974.

Other portions of the Manchester Mills housing units survive in the National Register-listed District B.

== See also ==
- National Register of Historic Places listings in Hillsborough County, New Hampshire
- District B
- District C
- District D
- District E
