= District D =

Historic district in New Hampshire, United States

- U.S. National Register of Historic Places
- U.S. Historic district
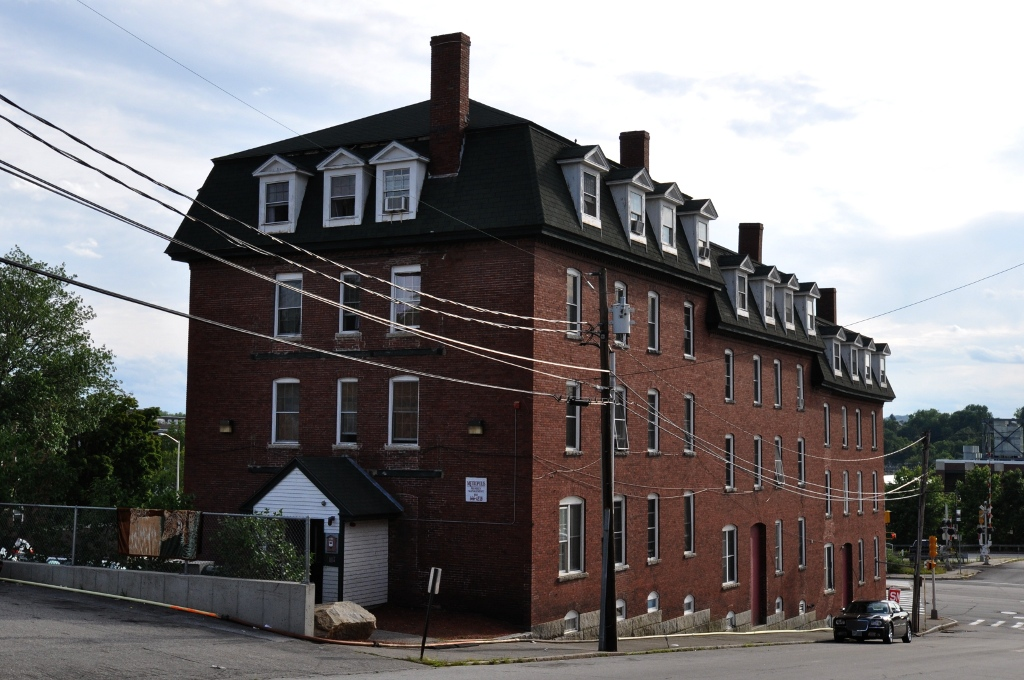
- A housing block on West Brook Street

- Location within New Hampshire Location within the United States
- Location: Roughly bounded by Canal, Langdon, Elm, and W. Brook Sts., Manchester, New Hampshire
- Coordinates: 42°59′57″N 71°27′59″W
- Area: 3 acres (1 ha)
- Built: 1864
- Architectural style: Second Empire
- MPS: Amoskeag Manufacturing Company Housing Districts TR
- NRHP reference No.: 82000621
- Added to NRHP: November 12, 1982

District D is a historic worker housing district located in Manchester, New Hampshire, near the former Amoskeag Manufacturing Company millyard. It is roughly bounded by Canal, Langdon, Elm, and West Brook streets, and was added to the National Register of Historic Places on November 12, 1982. It contains three residential buildings constructed in 1864 in an area of about 3 acres (1 ha).

== Description and history ==
District D is located near the northern end of Manchester's mill district, between the mill buildings lining the canals next to the Merrimack River on the west, and Elm Street, the city's main downtown thoroughfare to the east. The district's historic buildings include two Second Empire worker rowhouses, oriented in an east-west direction facing West Brook and Langdon streets respectively, and a former overseer's house located further up the hill on the south side of West Brook Street. The rowhouses are each three-story brick buildings with mansard roofs, with four units set in a stepped arrangement to compensate for the sloping terrain. The overseer's house is a four-unit two-story brick building covered with a hip roof, oriented north-south. The front of the building faces up the hill, with two entrance bays sheltered by gabled porticos, while two-story ells project from the rear.

These buildings were among several built in 1864 for the Langdon Mills, whose buildings (only one of which survives) stood to the west across what is now Canal Street. They were built by the Amoskeag Manufacturing Company according to its plans, and were among the last to use a standard layout, in which the worker housing is nearest the mills, the overseers are further up the hill, and an agent's house (now no longer standing) on Elm Street, at the top of the rise. The overseer's building is now separated from the worker tenements by a 20th-century warehouse.

== See also ==
- National Register of Historic Places listings in Hillsborough County, New Hampshire
- District A
- District B
- District C
- District E
