= Old Brewer High School =

- Brewer High School
- U.S. National Register of Historic Places
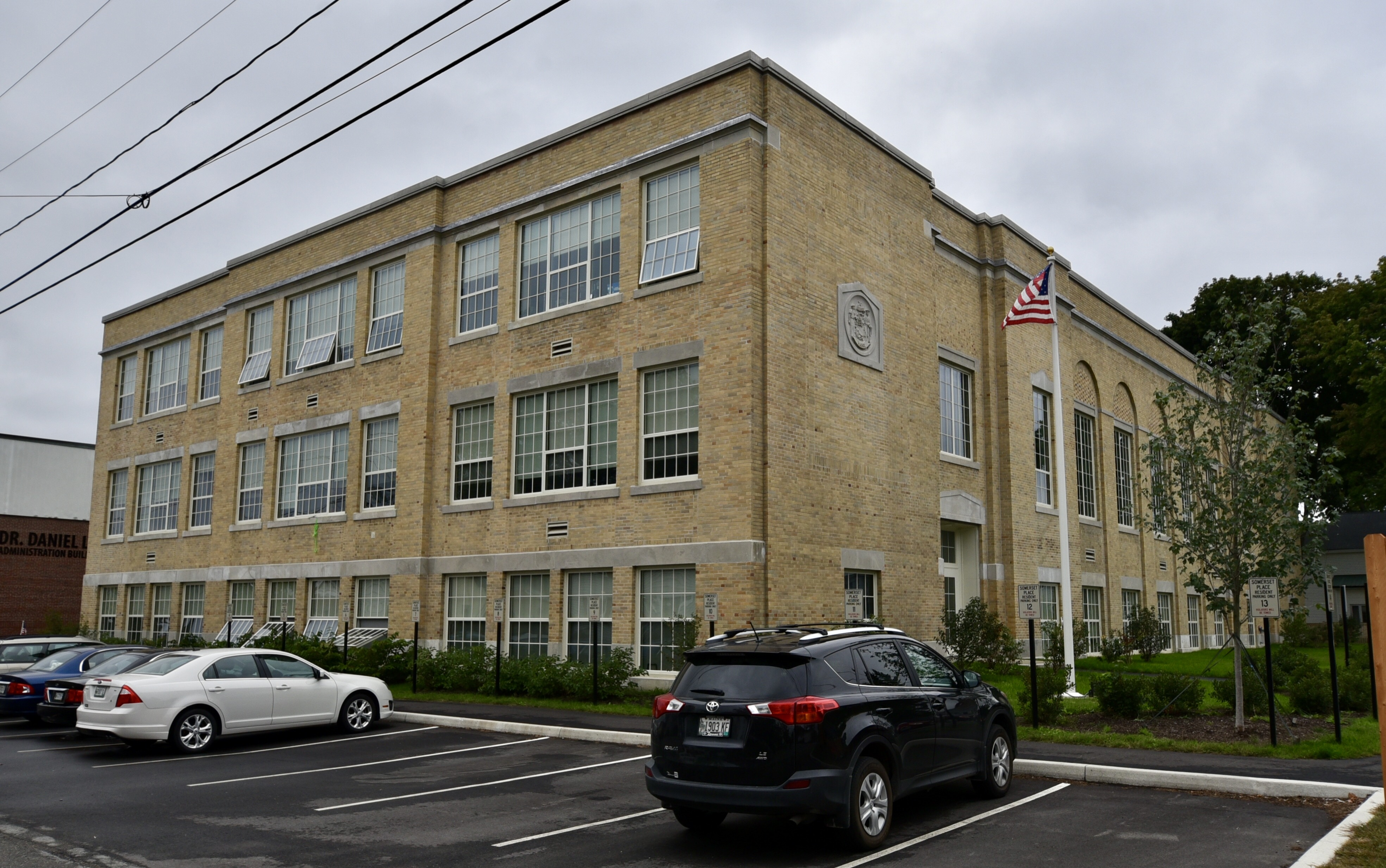

- Location within Maine Location within the United States
- Location: 5 Somerset St. Brewer, Maine
- Coordinates: 44.7920°N 68.7597°W
- Area: 0.75 acres (0.30 ha)
- Built: 1925
- Built by: Richard Kennedy & Company
- Architect: Butterfield-Guertin Company
- Architectural style: Art Deco
- NRHP reference No.: 14000838
- Added to NRHP: October 8, 2014

The Old Brewer High School is a historic school building at 5 Somerset Street in Brewer, Maine. Built in 1925-26, this Art Deco building was built to meet the ideals of the time for what a high school should be. The building was listed on the National Register of Historic Places in 2014.

== Description and history ==
The Old Brewer High School is located in the city's most densely built residential area, on a lot bounded by Somerset and Center Streets to the north and east, and separated from Parker Street by a line of residences. It is roughly rectangular in shape, two stories in height, with the ground floor slightly below grade on the front (north-facing) facade. It has a somewhat industrial Art Deco appearance, with outer wing sections whose facades are plain brick except for secondary double-door entrances at the base, and a decorative cast stone panel roughly at mid-height. Between these wings are nine bays, arranged with five central bays set in recessed round-arch panels, projecting bays flanking those, and recessed bays at the outside, which have the main entrances on the ground floor. Windows are paired sash, with those on the second floor topped by fixed transom windows.

Prior to the construction of Brewer's first high school in 1873, the city's secondary education was provided by neighboring Bangor's high school. Brewer experience significant growth over the following decades, making evident the need for enlarged and updated facilities. The city commissioned the Butterfield-Guertin Company of Manchester, New Hampshire to design a new high school, which was completed in 1926. This facility was built to meet recently published detailed guidelines for school buildings, these specifications covering everything from site selection to building materials and interior layout. The school was located near to many students, on a large lot that would accommodate expansion and athletic facilities, and was built with fire-resistant materials in a layout that provided large amounts of natural light. It had dedicated separate spaces for use as auditorium and gymnasium, and had space for industrial and domestic vocational education. In 1947 a new combined gymnasium/shop space was built in a separate structure behind the present school. This was replaced in 1979 with a modern brick building, which was connected to the main building by a single-story hyphen.

== See also ==
- Brewer High School (Maine), the present city high school
- National Register of Historic Places listings in Penobscot County, Maine
