= Wildwood Hall =

Historic house in Vermont, United States

- U.S. National Register of Historic Places
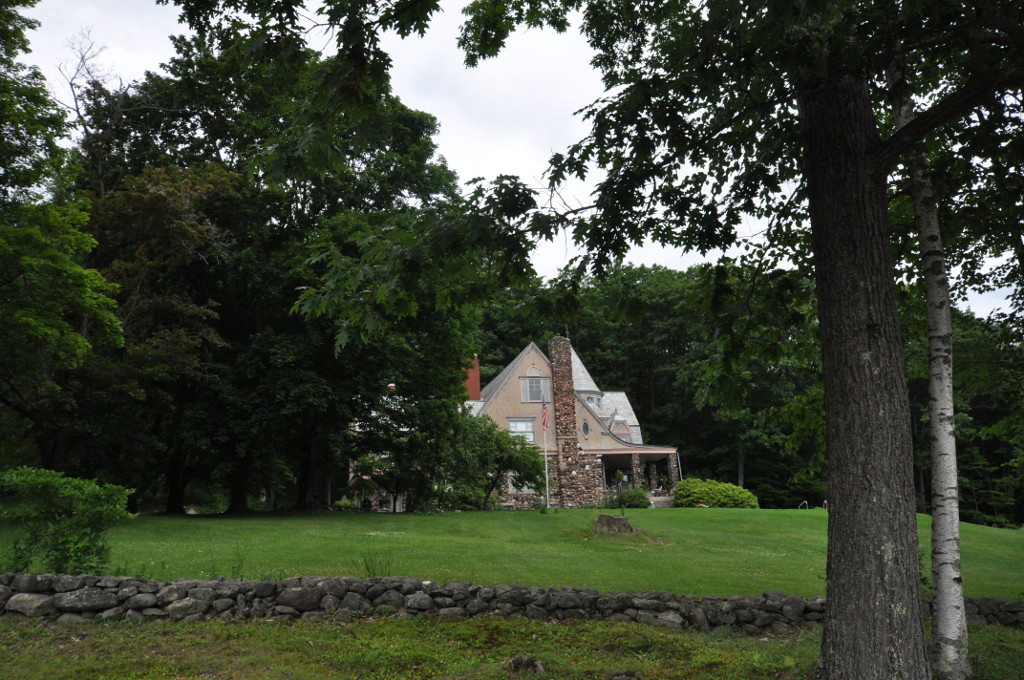

- Location within Vermont Location within the United States
- Location: Moore's Hill Rd., Newbury, Vermont
- Coordinates: 44°3′54″N 72°4′24″W
- Area: 11 acres (4.5 ha)
- Built: 1893
- Built by: Martin Perkins
- Architect: William M. Butterfield
- Architectural style: Shingle Style
- NRHP reference No.: 78000237
- Added to NRHP: October 2, 1978

Wildwood Hall is a historic house on Moore's Hill Road in Newbury, Vermont. Also known locally as The Castle, it is a distinctive example of Shingle style architecture, designed as a country house by William M. Butterfield and completed in 1895. It was listed on the National Register of Historic Places in 1978.

== Description and history ==
Wildwood Hall stands in southeastern Newbury, on a hillside overlooking the Connecticut River valley to the east and south. It is set on the north side of Moore's Hill Road, on an 11-acre (4.5 ha) parcel that is formally landscaped in the immediate vicinity of the house. The house is a 2 1/2-story, its first floor built out of uncoursed fieldstone, and its upper levels framed in wood and clad in wooden shingles. The main block is covered by a gabled roof, while the crossing ell has a gambrel roof. At the crook of the ell, a round tower with conical roof rises above a squared porch supported by fieldstone columns. The interior retains original Queen Anne woodwork, and a mosaic marble floor in its main floor.

The house was built between 1893 and 1895, for George Moore, on a site that was documented as early as 1799 for its magnificent views of the river valley. It was designed by William M. Butterfield of Manchester, New Hampshire, who had a reputation for high-quality Queen Anne and Shingle style designs. Moore lived here until his death in 1905.

== See also ==
- National Register of Historic Places listings in Orange County, Vermont
