= Beth Eden Baptist Church (Waltham, Massachusetts) =

Historic church in Massachusetts, United States

- U.S. National Register of Historic Places
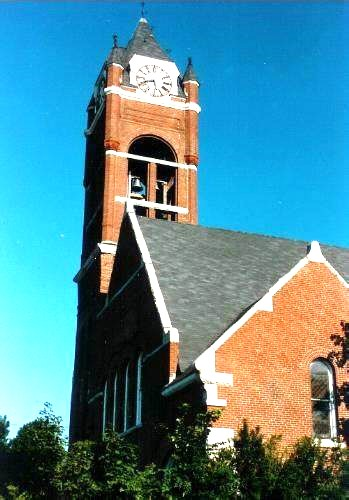

- Location within Massachusetts Location within the United States
- Location: Waltham, Massachusetts
- Coordinates: 42°22′4.8″N 71°14′18.5″W
- Area: less than one acre
- Architect: William M. Butterfield
- Architectural style: Romanesque
- MPS: Waltham MRA
- NRHP reference No.: 89001544
- Added to NRHP: September 28, 1989

The Beth Eden Baptist Church is a historic Baptist church building at 84 Maple Street in Waltham, Massachusetts. Built in 1891, it is a fine local example of Romanesque Revival architecture and is further notable as the oldest church on Waltham's South Side. The church was added to the National Historic Register of Historic Places in 1989. Its Settled Pastor is Rev. Dr. Esther Pearson.

== Architecture and history ==
The church is located on the north side of Maple Street, just west of its junction with Moody Street. Maple Street is a major east-west route through Waltham's South Side, and Moody Street is its economic spine. The church is built principally of brick, but the lower half of the ground floor is fashioned out of uncoursed fieldstone. The gabled roof is oriented north-south, with a tall tower at the southwest corner, that has an open belfry topped by a pyramidal roof with gable-topped clock faces. The main entrance is housed inside a large round-arch opening at the base of the gabled section, and has two board-and-batten doors flanked by Romanesque windows with simple tracery.

The church was designed by William M. Butterfield of Manchester, New Hampshire, and completed in 1891. It is the oldest surviving church building on Waltham's South Side, built during expansion related to the success of the Waltham Watch Company. The congregation was organized out of the city's First Baptist Church in 1887. The building suffered a major fire in 1908, from which it was rebuilt to largely the same plan, allowing increased space for an organ. The tower originally housed a city-owned clock.

== See also ==
- National Register of Historic Places listings in Waltham, Massachusetts
