= District B =

Historic district in New Hampshire, United States

- U.S. National Register of Historic Places
- U.S. Historic district
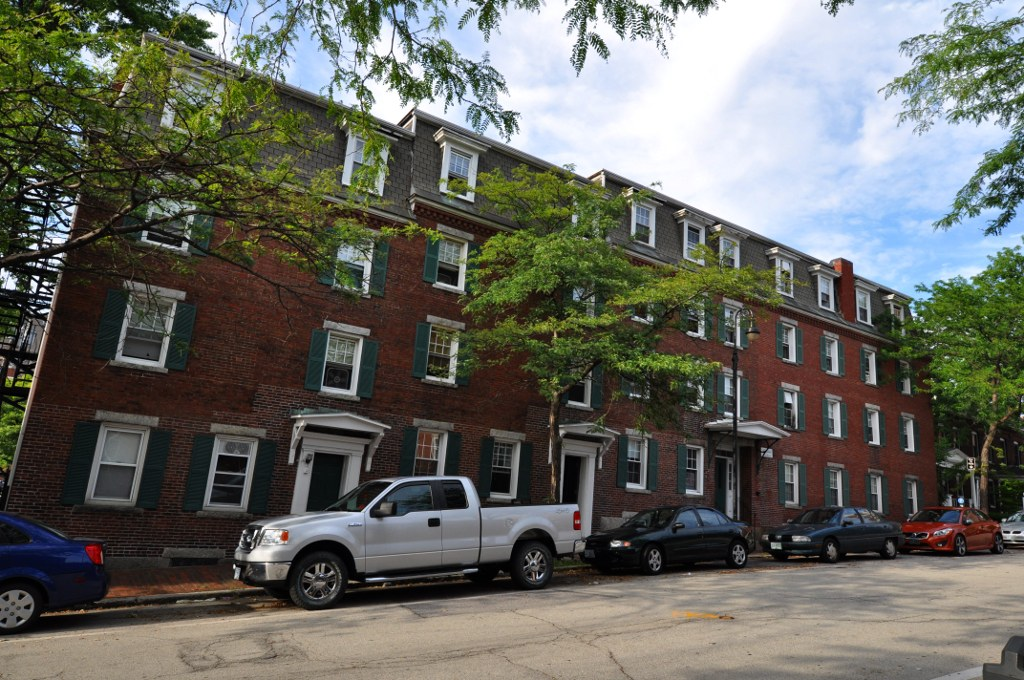
- A row house on Market Street

- Location within New Hampshire Location within the United States
- Location: Roughly bounded by Canal, Mechanic, Franklin, and Pleasant Sts., Manchester, New Hampshire
- Coordinates: 42°59′25″N 71°27′57″W
- Area: 170 acres (69 ha)
- Built: 1838
- MPS: Amoskeag Manufacturing Company Housing Districts TR
- NRHP reference No.: 82000619
- Added to NRHP: November 12, 1982

District B is a historic worker housing district located in Manchester, New Hampshire, United States, near the former Amoskeag Manufacturing Company millyard. It is roughly bounded by Canal, Mechanic, Franklin, and Pleasant Streets, and was added to the National Register of Historic Places on November 12, 1982. It contains 32 contributing properties, including seventeen rowhouse tenement blocks built mainly between 1838 and 1850, in an area of approximately 170 acres (69 ha).

== Description and history ==
District B is a roughly rectangular area, located east of the mills formerly of the Amoskeag Manufacturing Company lining the eastern bank of the Merrimack River. Between Franklin and Mechanic Streets, several streets extend eastward from Canal Street (formerly the site of a power canal), lined for part of their extent to Elm Street with what are mainly tenement-style brick residential buildings. In addition to housing for workers, this area includes some of the oldest surviving examples of housing built for supervisory personnel. The district also includes three non-residential buildings: the former Amoskeag employment office, a 1937 bank, and a small brick factory building dating to the late 1930s.

The oldest of the surviving housing in this district was built in 1838-39 between Mechanic and Stark Streets, when the Amoskeag proprietors were building out the mills immediately to the west for the Stark Manufacturing Company. At that time, the worker housing blocks were oriented east–west (perpendicular to the canals and the mill buildings), with the overseer housing set crosswise to them. Of this first set of buildings, the overseer housing units have been demolished, but instances survive further south, in the housing blocks built for Amoskeag Mill 3 in 1843 between West Merrimack and Market Streets.

== See also ==
- National Register of Historic Places listings in Hillsborough County, New Hampshire
- District A
- District C
- District D
- District E
