= Sphinx (senior society) =

Student group at Dartmouth College, US

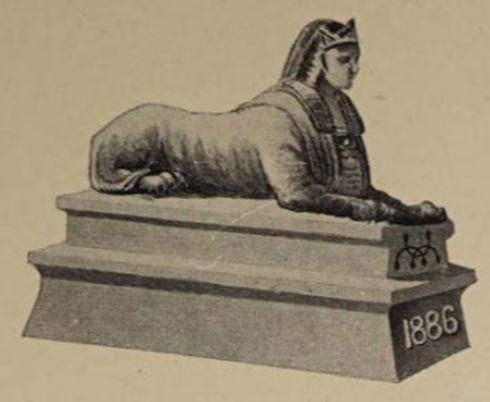
- Founded: 1885; 141 years ago Dartmouth College
- Type: Secret
- Affiliation: Independent
- Status: Active
- Emphasis: Seniors
- Scope: Local
- Chapters: 1
- Headquarters: East Wheelock Street; Hanover, New Hampshire; United States

- Sphinx Tomb
- U.S. National Register of Historic Places
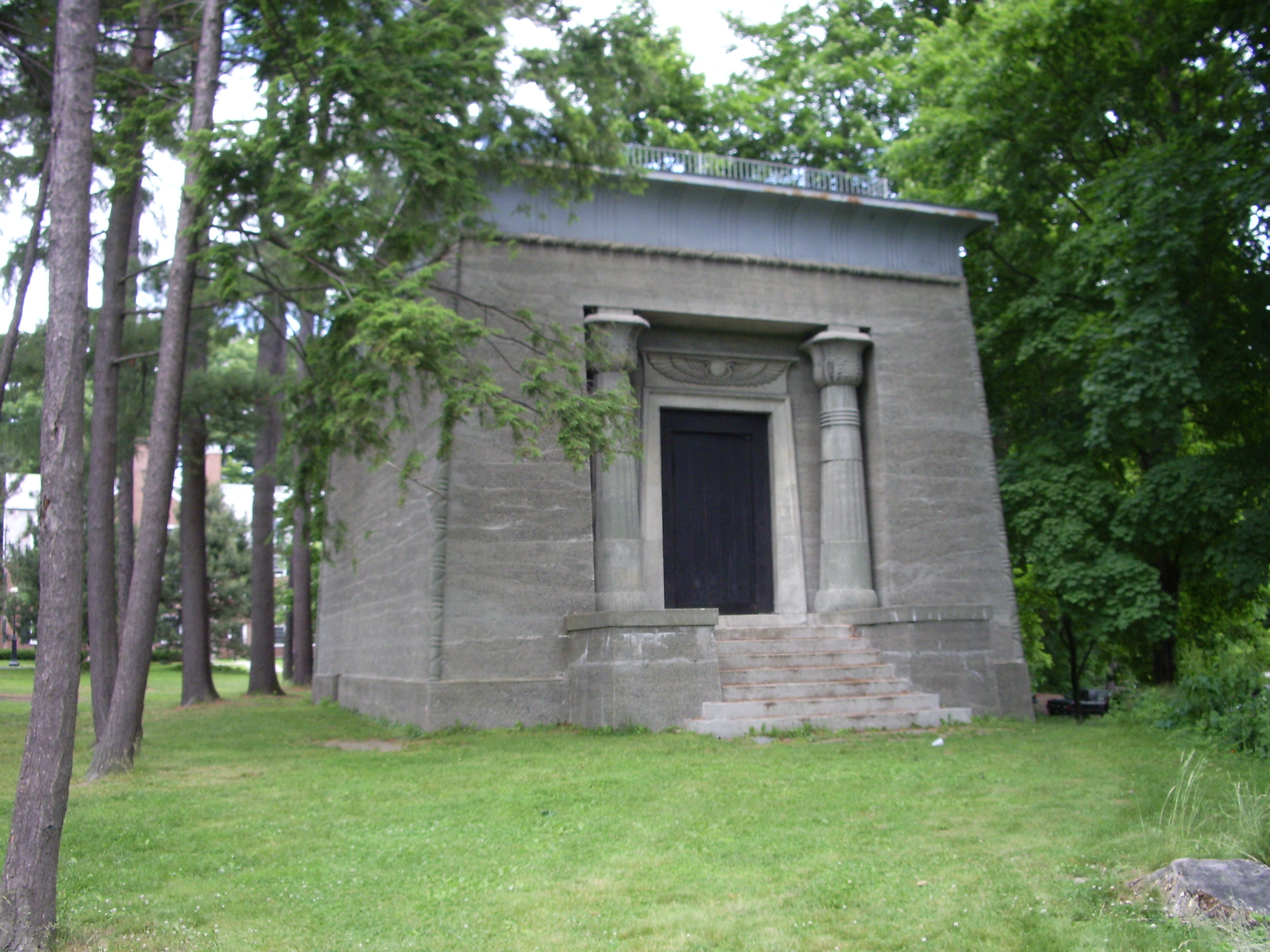
- Location: Hanover, Grafton County, New Hampshire, US
- Built: 1903
- Architect: William M. Butterfield
- Architectural style: Exotic Revival and Egyptian Revival
- NRHP reference No.: 05000173
- Added to NRHP: March 17, 2005

The Sphinx is a collegiate senior society for male students at Dartmouth College in Hanover, New Hampshire. Founded in 1885, it was the first senior society established at the college. The society is known for the Sphinx Tomb, its Egyptian Revival style building designed by architect William M. Butterfield in 1903. The Sphinx Tomb was listed on the National Register of Historic Places in 2006.

== History ==
1923 proposed addition to Sphinx Hall

In 1885, the Sphinx was founded as a senior-class society at Dartmouth College in Hanover, New Hampshire by fourteen male students of the class of 1886. It was the first senior society at Dartmouth. Initially, the group met at Thornton Hall on Saturday nights. Later, the society rented a hall on Main Street along with the campus fraternities. In 1903, Sphinx became the first senior society on campus to build a hall or tomb for its gatherings.

Dance card from a dance hosted by The Sphinx in 1899.

The senior members of the Sphinx select a small number of male students of the junior class during Winter Carnival Weekend in a process known as "tapping." Traditionally selecting 24 members per year. The main criteria used to select members is community leadership.

The Sphinx originally published the names of its members in the annual Aegis, but the society has become more secretive in recent years. The identities of the members are now kept secret until the college's spring commencement, when graduating members carry identifying canes.

The society is secretive about its purpose or mission, but says that it "supports Dartmouth." The Sphinx Foundation is the business name of Sphinx. The association is a registered non-profit corporation to hold Sphinx's assets, including its endowment, and serves as the society's alumni board. Sphinx's assets total $7.28 million as of 2025.

== Symbols ==
Members of Sphinx refer to each other as "frater". Each pledge class of members is called a "krewe". Sphinx members carry a cane with a sphinx handle at commencement; this is how the society publicly acknowledges its members.

== Sphinx Tomb ==
The Sphinx Tomb was constructed in 1903 on East Wheelock Street. It was designed by Manchester architect William M. Butterfield was inspired by the Temple of Dendur. Built from reinforced concrete, the windowless Sphinx Tomb was designed to look like an Egyptian tomb. It reflects the Egyptian Revival architectural style popular during the mid-nineteenth century and fits with the society's iconography. The tomb's facade has a stairway leading to the entrance, flanked by two columns and topped by a winged disk. However, this is not the building's main entrance, as the doors lacks a handle.

In addition to providing space for the society's gatherings, the tomb also includes a living room, a library, a billiards room, and a card room. In 1923, a significant addition was planned for the Sphinx Tomb; however, the proposed addition was never constructed. Instead, a smaller rear addition was designed by campus planner Jens Fredrick Larson and was constructed in 1926. The interior of the Sphinx Tomb destroyed by a fire that started in the building's furnace on April 9, 1931. The society restored the tomb's interior in 1932, rather than relocating.

The Sphinx Tomb was listed on the National Register of Historic Places on March 17, 2005. The tomb is owned by the Sphinx Alumni Association and serves as its headquarters.

== Misconduct and scandals ==
The Sphinx attracted negative publicity in 1989 when thefts that took place during a scavenger hunt were traced back to the secret society. On April 27, 1989, sixteen students took part in a scavenger hunt that resulted in the theft of numerous items across the Dartmouth campus, including paintings, photographs, mailboxes, life preservers, and signs. The school estimated the total value of missing items at nearly $12,000. Dartmouth College demanded that all items be returned undamaged within 24 hours, in which case it would not investigate further. Most items were returned, but as several were still missing, an investigation was launched, which revealed that the Sphinx was responsible for the scavenger hunt. Dartmouth revoked recognition of the Sphinx for one year, fined the organization $3,000 plus the cost of damages to the stolen items, and punished the sixteen members involved with probation or suspension.

In 2003, two unidentified males broke into the Sphinx Tomb by forcing open its side door and several interior doors. This incident was unusual because the break-in was successful; attempts are made to enter the Sphinx tomb at least once a year.

== See also ==
- Dartmouth College student groups
- List of collegiate secret societies
- National Register of Historic Places listings in Grafton County, New Hampshire
