= Roger Sullivan House =

Historic house in New Hampshire, United States

- U.S. National Register of Historic Places
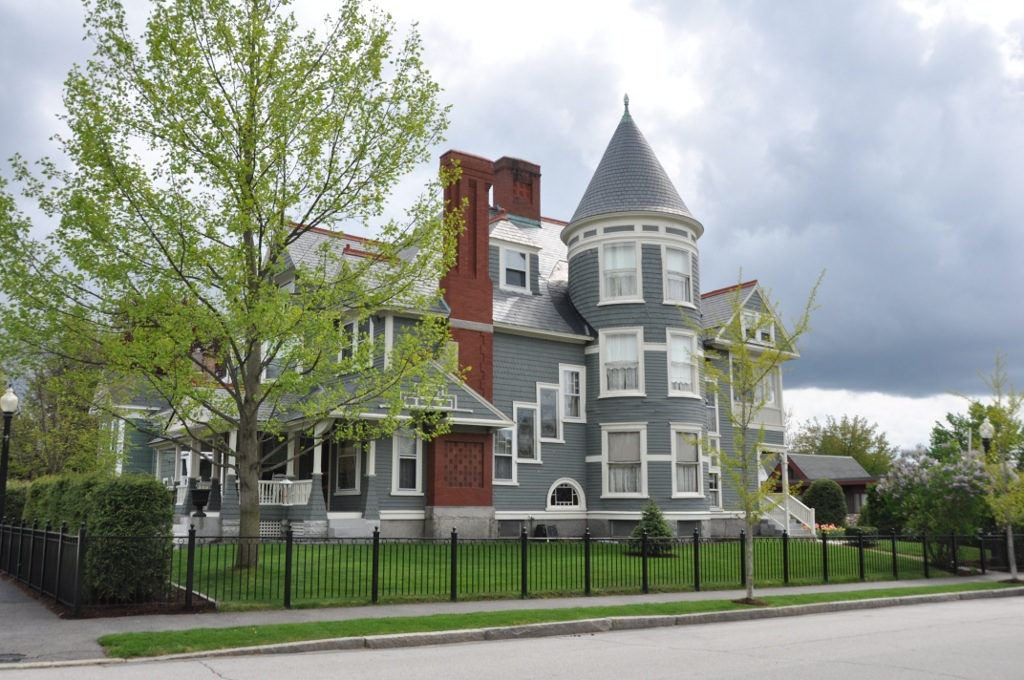

- Location within New Hampshire Location within the United States
- Location: 168 Walnut St., Manchester, New Hampshire
- Coordinates: 42°59′54″N 71°27′30″W
- Area: less than one acre
- Built: 1892
- Built by: Wilberforce Ireland
- Architect: William M. Butterfield
- Architectural style: Queen Anne
- NRHP reference No.: 04000150
- Added to NRHP: March 10, 2004

The Roger Sullivan House is a historic house at 168 Walnut Street in Manchester, New Hampshire. Built in 1892, it is the only known example of residential Queen Anne architecture by local architect William M. Butterfield, and is one of the city's finest examples of the style. It was listed on the National Register of Historic Places in 2004.

== Description and history ==
The Roger Sullivan House is located in a residential area north of downtown Manchester, at the southwest corner of Walnut and Prospect Streets. It is a 2 1/2-story wood-frame structure, with asymmetrical massing typical of the Queen Anne style. It is covered by a hip roof and finished in wooden clapboards and shingles. It is an exuberant expression of Queen Anne design, with varied gables, porches, chimneys, and bays, and a three-story turret capped with a conical roof. A period carriage house stands to the southwest of the house.

The house was designed by local architect William M. Butterfield, and built in 1892 for Roger G. Sullivan on land he purchased in 1890 from the Amoskeag Manufacturing Company. Sullivan, a native of Bradford, New Hampshire, was manufacturer of one of the most widely distributed brands of ten-cent cigars, employing as many as 800 workers in a factory on West Central Street. Butterfield was one of the city's most prolific architects of the period, producing designs for all types of buildings and in many different styles. The house's builder, Wilberforce Ireland, was one of Manchester's leading contractors of the period. The house remained in the Sullivan family until 1957.

== See also ==
- National Register of Historic Places listings in Hillsborough County, New Hampshire
