= Harrington-Smith Block =

- U.S. National Register of Historic Places
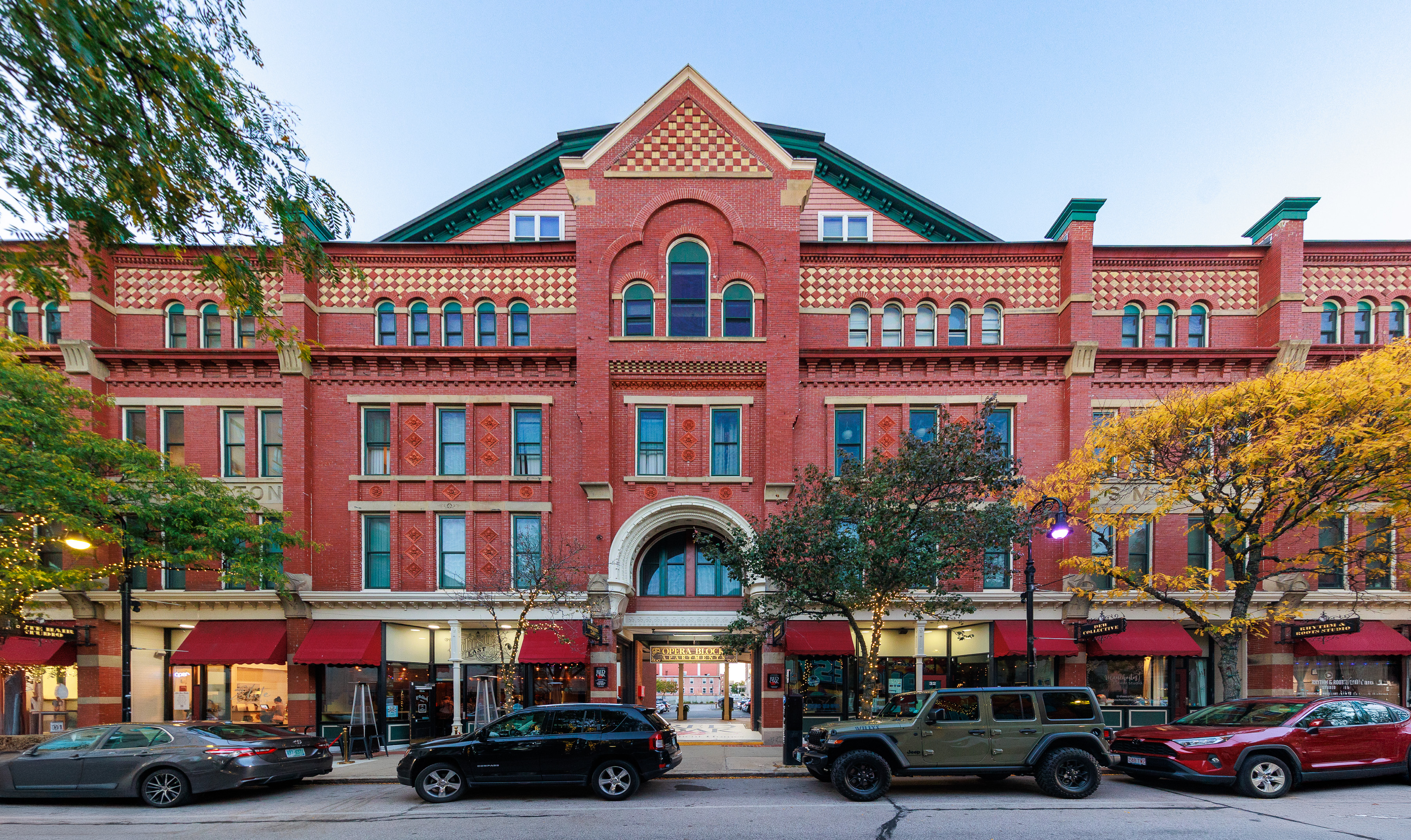

- Location within New Hampshire Location within the United States
- Location: 18-52 Hanover St., Manchester, New Hampshire
- Coordinates: 42°59′28″N 71°27′44″W
- Area: less than one acre
- Built: 1880
- Architect: John T. Fanning
- Architectural style: Queen Anne
- NRHP reference No.: 86003367
- Added to NRHP: January 28, 1987

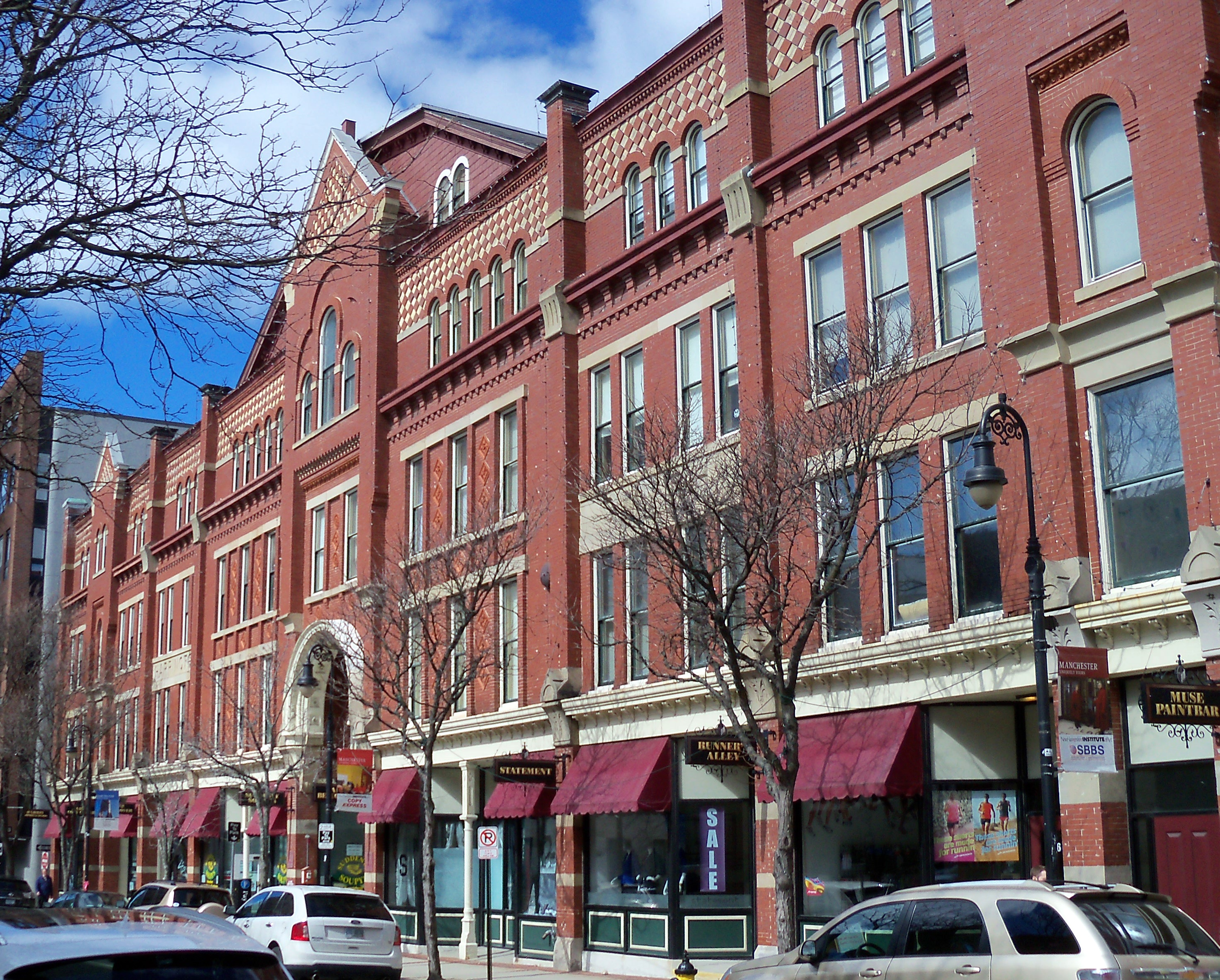
Looking down Hanover Street

The Harrington-Smith Block, formerly known as the Strand Theater and the Manchester Opera House, is a historic commercial building at 18-25 Hanover Street in the heart of Manchester, New Hampshire. Built in 1881 to a design by John T. Fanning for two prominent local developers, the building is an expansive rendition of Queen Anne styling in brick and stone. It housed the city's premier performance venue for many years, and was an early home of the influential Manchester Union Leader, the state's major daily newspaper. The building was listed on the National Register of Historic Places in 1987.

== Description and history ==
The Harrington-Smith Block is located in downtown Manchester, occupying 200 feet (61 m) of frontage on Hanover Street and 95 feet (29 m) on Elm Street, the city's principal downtown thoroughfare. It has a central four-story main block, finished mainly in red brick. There are eight store fronts, articulated by brick piers rising the full height of the building. The central entrance, originally for the opera house, projects slightly, and there are secondary entrances between the first and second bays at each end. The storefronts are topped by pressed metal panels, and have recessed entrances flanked by display windows.

The building combined retail and commercial business activities with a large performing space (now demolished) in the rear. The building was an early home to the Manchester Union Leader, the state's major daily newspaper. After the closure of most of the city's mills beginning in the 1930s, the upper floors of the building were converted to residential use. Major fires in 1985 resulted in the loss of the auditorium and significant damage to the rest of the building's interior. It was rehabilitated, and continues to house shops on the ground level and residences above.

== See also ==
- National Register of Historic Places listings in Hillsborough County, New Hampshire
