= Pittsfield Center Historic District =

Historic district in New Hampshire, United States

- U.S. National Register of Historic Places
- U.S. Historic district
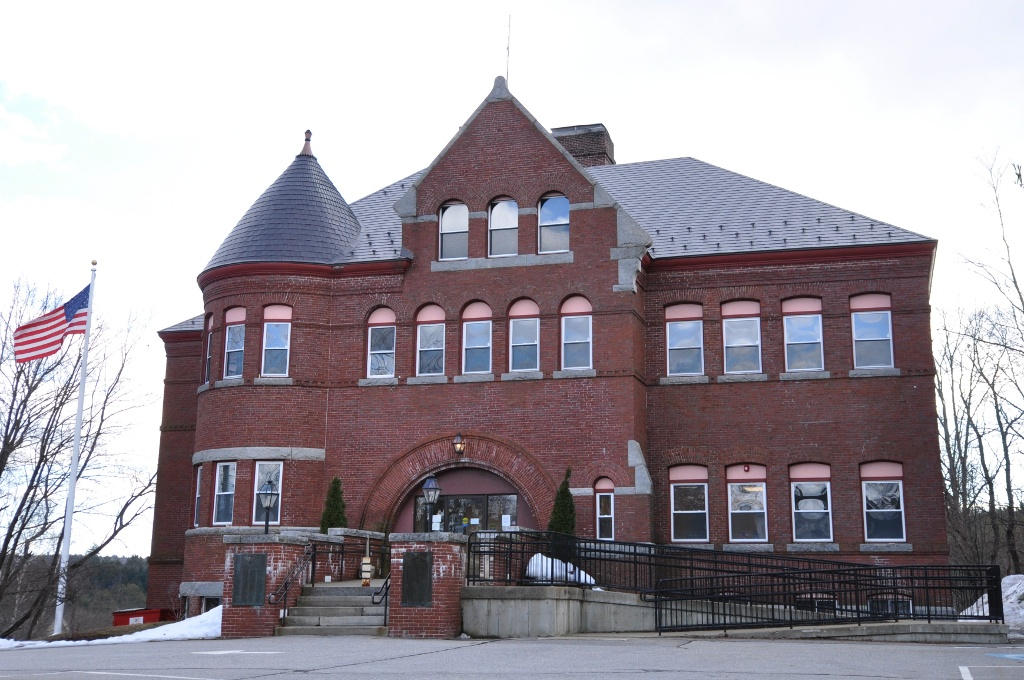
- Town Hall

- Location within New Hampshire Location within the United States
- Location: NH 28 and NH 107, Pittsfield, New Hampshire
- Coordinates: 43°18′18″N 71°19′34″W
- Area: 45 acres (18 ha)
- Architectural style: Mid 19th Century Revival, Late Victorian, Federal
- NRHP reference No.: 80000416
- Added to NRHP: December 12, 1980

The Pittsfield Center Historic District encompasses the civic and commercial heart of Pittsfield, New Hampshire. This area is defined by a roughly square bend in the Suncook River, whose power provided an impetus for the development of the town in the 19th century. The dominant feature of the district was the 1827 Joy Cotton Mill, a four-story brick building at the base of Main Street. It was damaged in a fire, and some of its features were reused in the construction of the present building according to a historic sign in front of the building. There are three churches, including the 1863 Gothic Revival St. Stephen's Episcopal Church, and the town office building, a significantly altered 1789 meeting house. The district also includes the main commercial district and some of the surrounding residential areas. It was listed on the National Register of Historic Places in 1980.

Pittsfield was settled in 1770, when John Cram erected a sawmill on the Suncook River and built his house, now part of the Washington House at the central Washington Square. The first meeting house was built in 1789, roughly midway between his house and mill, the route between these points defining what is now Main Street. Taverns were built near the meeting house soon afterward, creating the nucleus of a town center. In the 19th century, the river's water power was harnessed for use by textile mills, resulting in the construction of both mills and mill worker housing. One boarding house, built in 1827 for single women who worked in an early textile mill, is among the oldest buildings of its type in the state. The arrival of the railroad in 1869 spurred another development boom, in which the shoe industry took hold.

== See also ==
- National Register of Historic Places listings in Merrimack County, New Hampshire
