= John T. Fanning =

American architect and engineer (1837–1911)

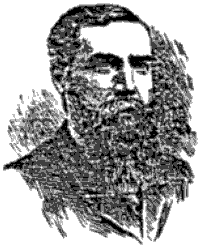
- Born: John Thomas Fanning; December 31, 1837; Norwich, Connecticut
- Died: February 6, 1911 (aged 73); Minneapolis, Minnesota
- Occupation(s): Architect, engineer
- Spouse: M. Louise Bensley (m. 1865)
- Children: 3

John Thomas Fanning (1837–1911) was an American architect and hydraulic engineer. His contribution to fluid mechanics and hydraulic engineering is in the Fanning friction factor which is used by engineers in the present age to calculate the frictional pressures losses in flows inside pipes.

== Biography ==
Fanning was born in Norwich, Connecticut on December 31, 1837. In 1861 he enlisted, and participated in the United States Civil War with the rank of colonel, until his discharge. After the war, he returned to Norwich, soon establishing an office for the practice of engineering. There he married M. Louise Bensley on June 14, 1865, and they had three children.

In 1872 he moved to Manchester, New Hampshire, to design that city's new municipal water system. By 1877 he established a second office as an architect. By 1885 he had begun to get several commissions in the west, warranting a move to Minneapolis. He served in many professional capacities as a hydraulic engineer, including consulting for many railroads.

After his move from Manchester, he did not practice as an architect again.

He died in Minneapolis on February 6, 1911.

== Architecture ==
- First Congregational Church, 508 Union St., Manchester, NH (1879–80)
- Opera House Block, 30 Hanover St., Manchester, NH (1880–81)
- Charles E. Balch House, 1779 Elm St., Manchester, NH (1881)
- Battery Building, 153-155 Manchester St., Manchester, NH (1883) - Demolished.
- Carpenter and Bean Block, Elm & Dow Sts., Manchester, NH (1883)
- New Hampshire Fire Insurance Co. Building, 886 Elm St., Manchester, NH (1885–86) - Demolished.

== Gallery ==
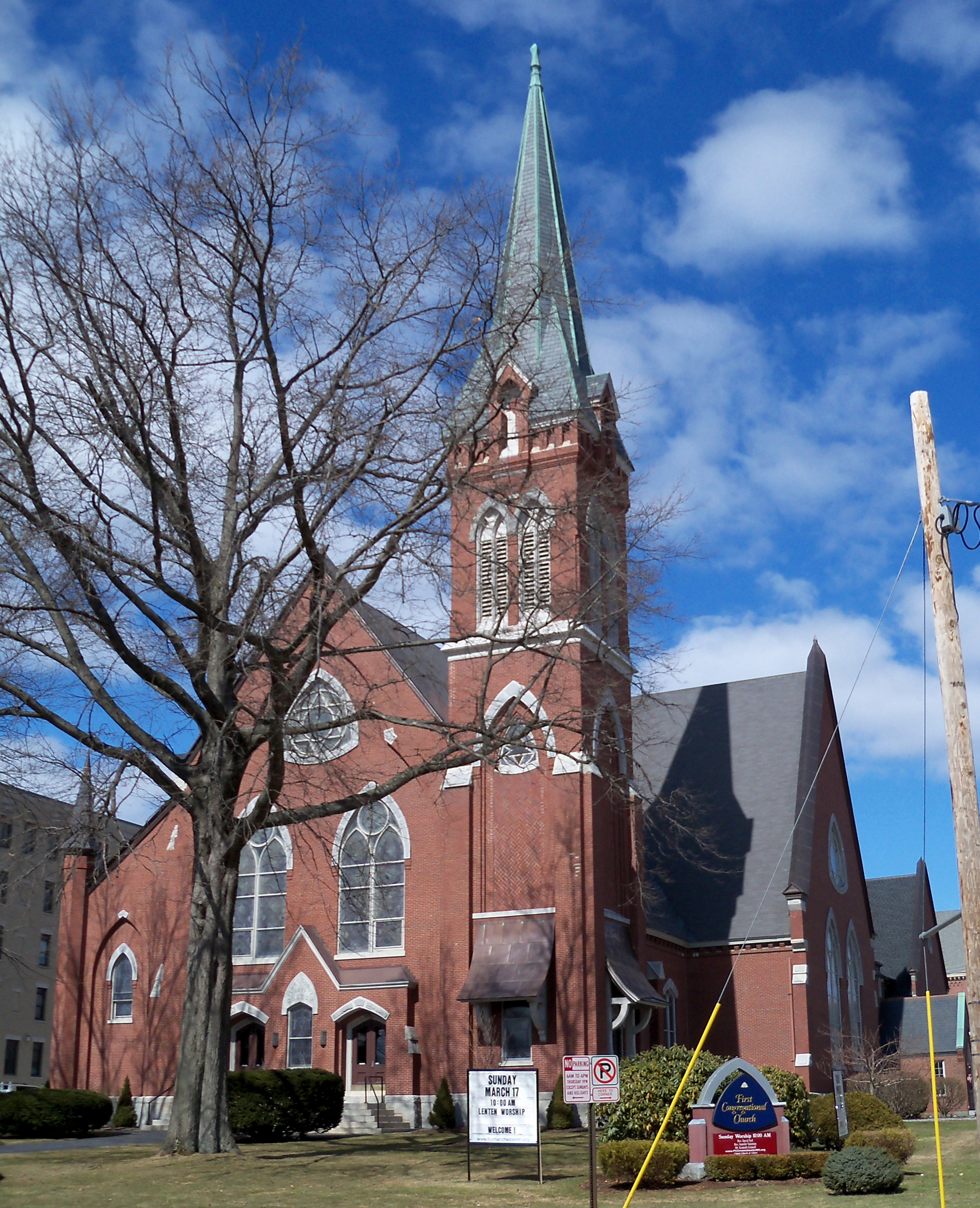
First Congregational Church, Manchester, NH, 1880

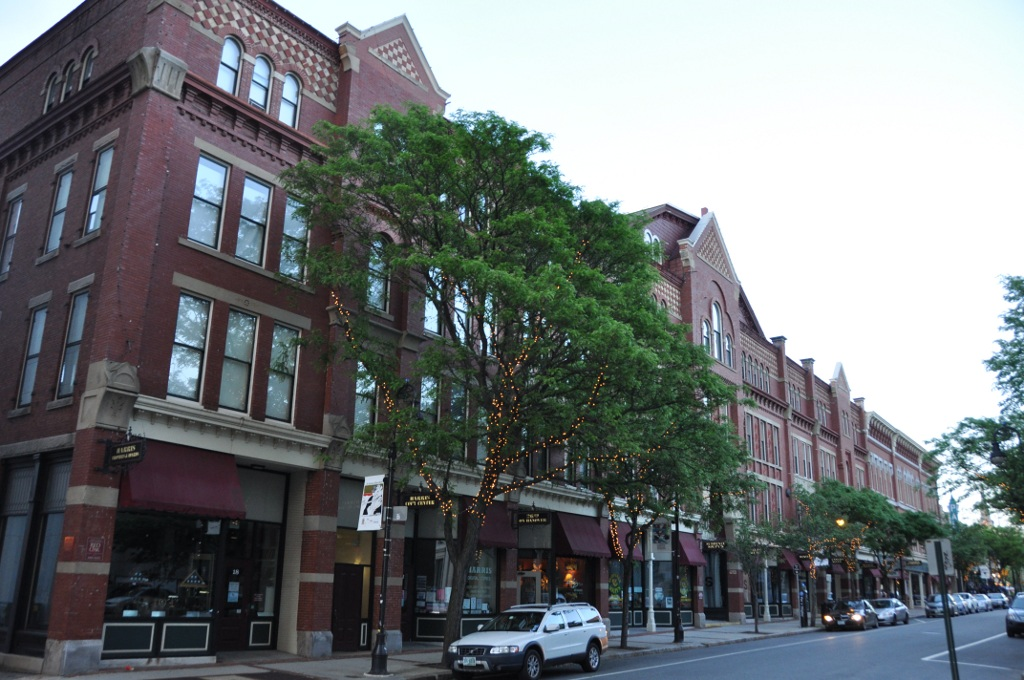
Opera House Block, Manchester, NH, 1881

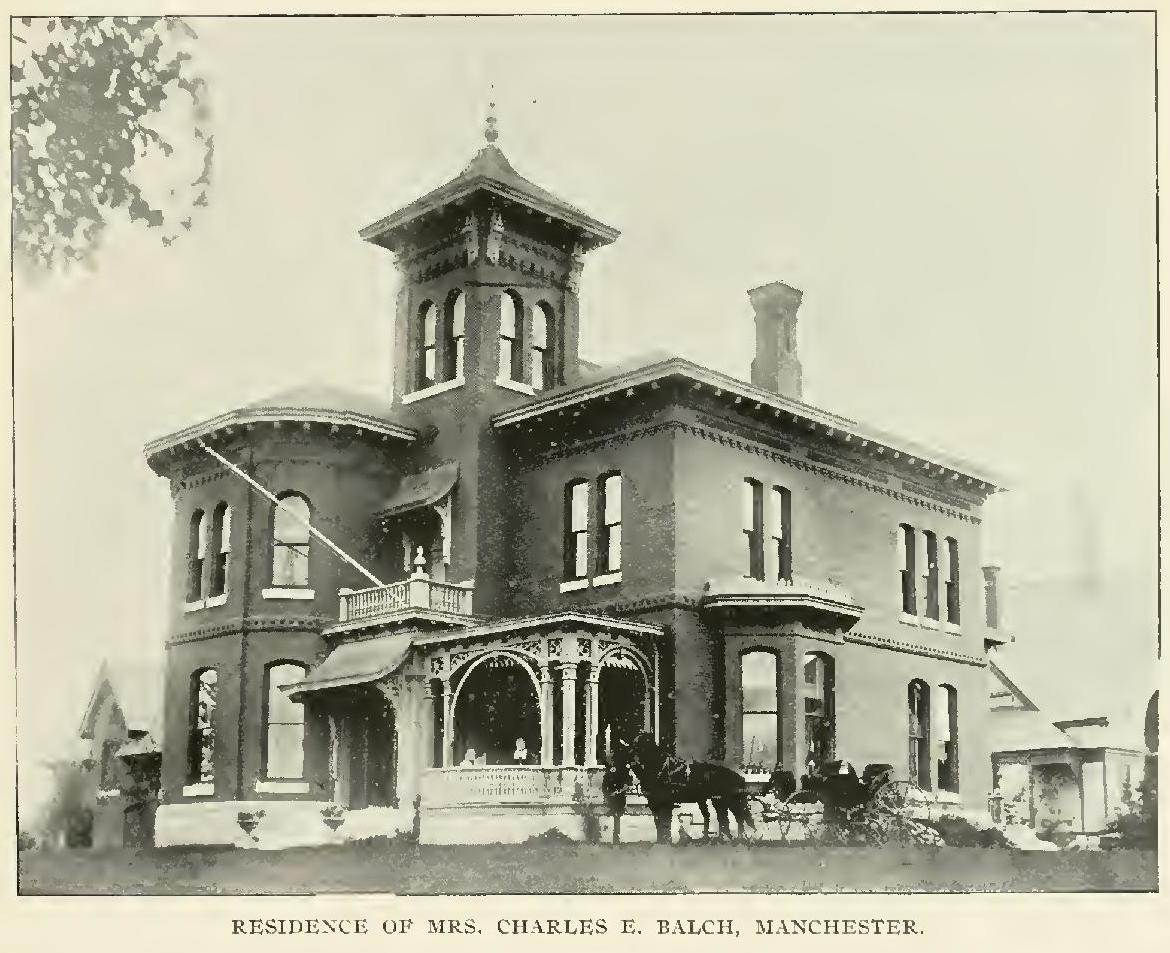
Charles E. Balch House, Manchester, NH, 1881

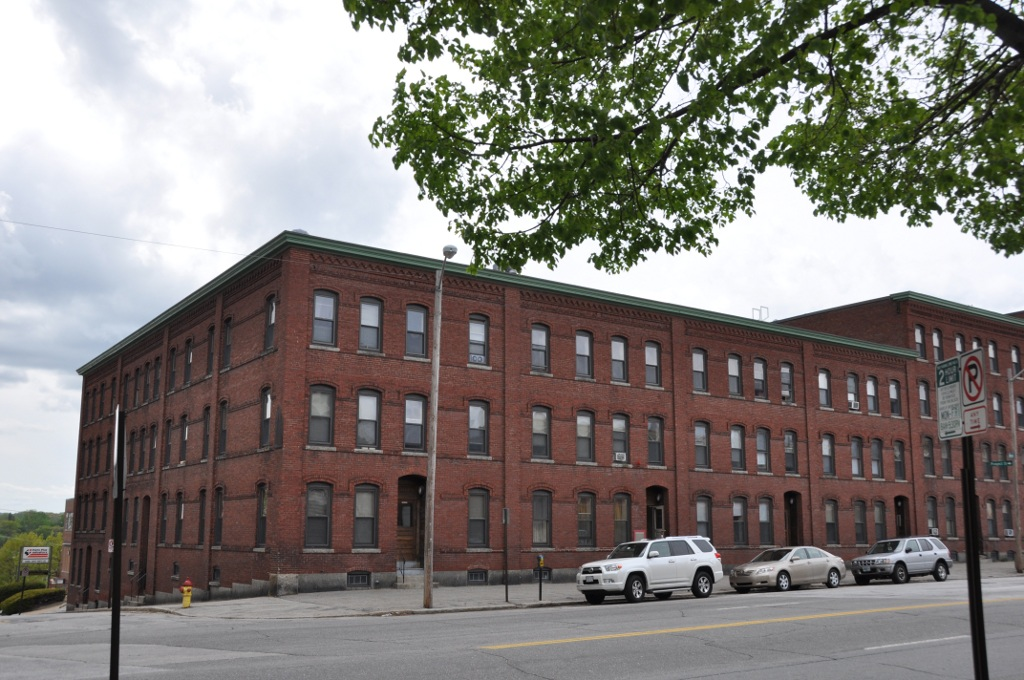
Carpenter and Bean Block, Manchester, NH, 1883
