= Smith and Dow Block =

- U.S. National Register of Historic Places
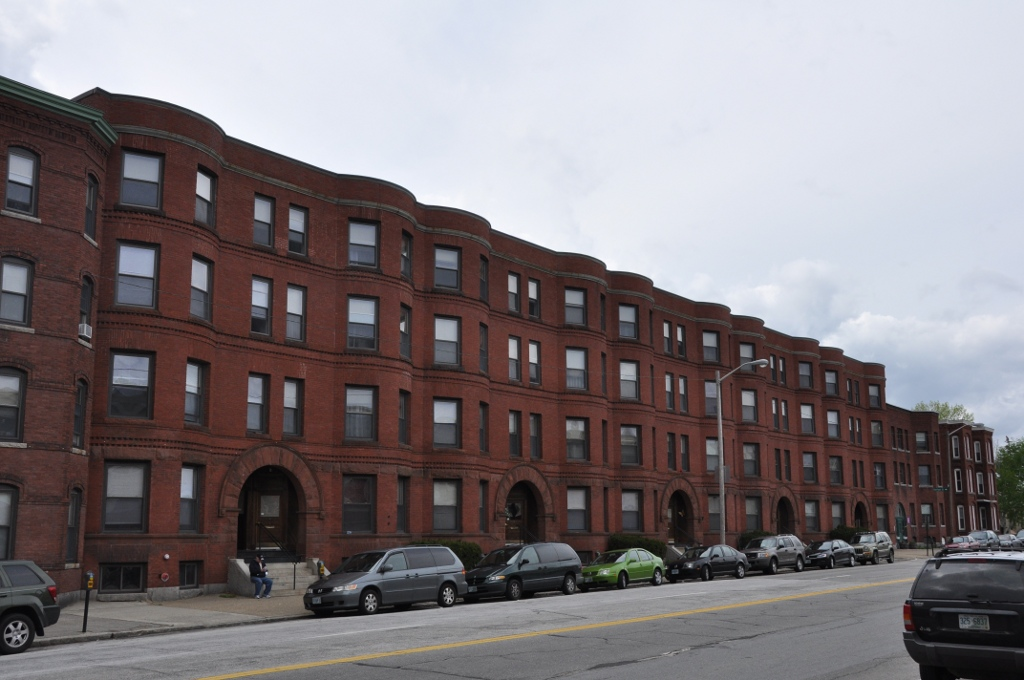

- Location within New Hampshire Location within the United States
- Location: 1426-1470 Elm St., Manchester, New Hampshire
- Coordinates: 42°59′54″N 71°27′54″W
- Area: 1.4 acres (0.57 ha)
- Built: 1892
- Built by: William S. Mitchell
- Architect: William M. Butterfield
- Architectural style: Romanesque
- NRHP reference No.: 02001549
- Added to NRHP: December 13, 2002

The Smith and Dow Block is a historic apartment house at 1426-70 Elm Street in Manchester, New Hampshire. When built in 1892, this four-story brick building was the largest apartment block in the state, and it still dominates its section of Elm Street. It has modest Romanesque styling elements, and was designed by William M. Butterfield, one of Manchester's leading architects, as an investment property for John Butler Smith and Frederick C. Dow. The building was listed on the National Register of Historic Places in 2002.

== Description and history ==
The Smith and Dow Block stands north of downtown Manchester, on the west side of Elm Street (its principal north–south thoroughfare) north of Dow Street. It presents 230 feet (70 m) of frontage to Elm Street and is 71 feet (22 m) deep, and had 40 units at a time when most apartment blocks had no more than 10–12. The facade is divided into five identical sections, consisting of rounded bays flanking a central entrance. The entrances are set in rounded arch openings fashioned out of rusticated stone. Windows are rectangular sash throughout, and there are stringcourses of brick and stone to provide horizontal separation of the floors.

The block was completed in 1892, and was far and away the largest apartment building in the city. Its amenities were at the time a step above those provided in typical apartment houses of the period, including hot and cold running water, sound-deadening walls between the units, and lighting by gas and electricity. Each section had a freight elevator, and there were dedicated basement storage spaces for each unit.

== See also ==
- National Register of Historic Places listings in Hillsborough County, New Hampshire
