= Amoskeag =

Amoskeag may refer to:

- Amoskeag Falls, a waterfall on the Merrimack River in Manchester, New Hampshire, USA
- Amoskeag Manufacturing Company, a former textile manufacturing company
  Amoskeag Company, a company spun off from the Amoskeag Manufacturing Company
- Amoskeag Locomotive Works, a former locomotive manufacturing company
- Amoskeag Rugby Club, a rugby team in Manchester, NH
