= Benjamin Prichard (disambiguation) =

Benjamin Prichard or Pritchard may refer to:

- Benjamin Prichard, an early American industrialist who founded the Amoskeag Mills in New Hampshire
- Benjamin Pritchard (rower), British para-rower
- Benjamin D. Pritchard, a U.S. Army officer
- Benjamin Prichard's Tennessee Whiskey, named after a 19th-century Tennessee distiller.
