= Forest conservation in the United States =

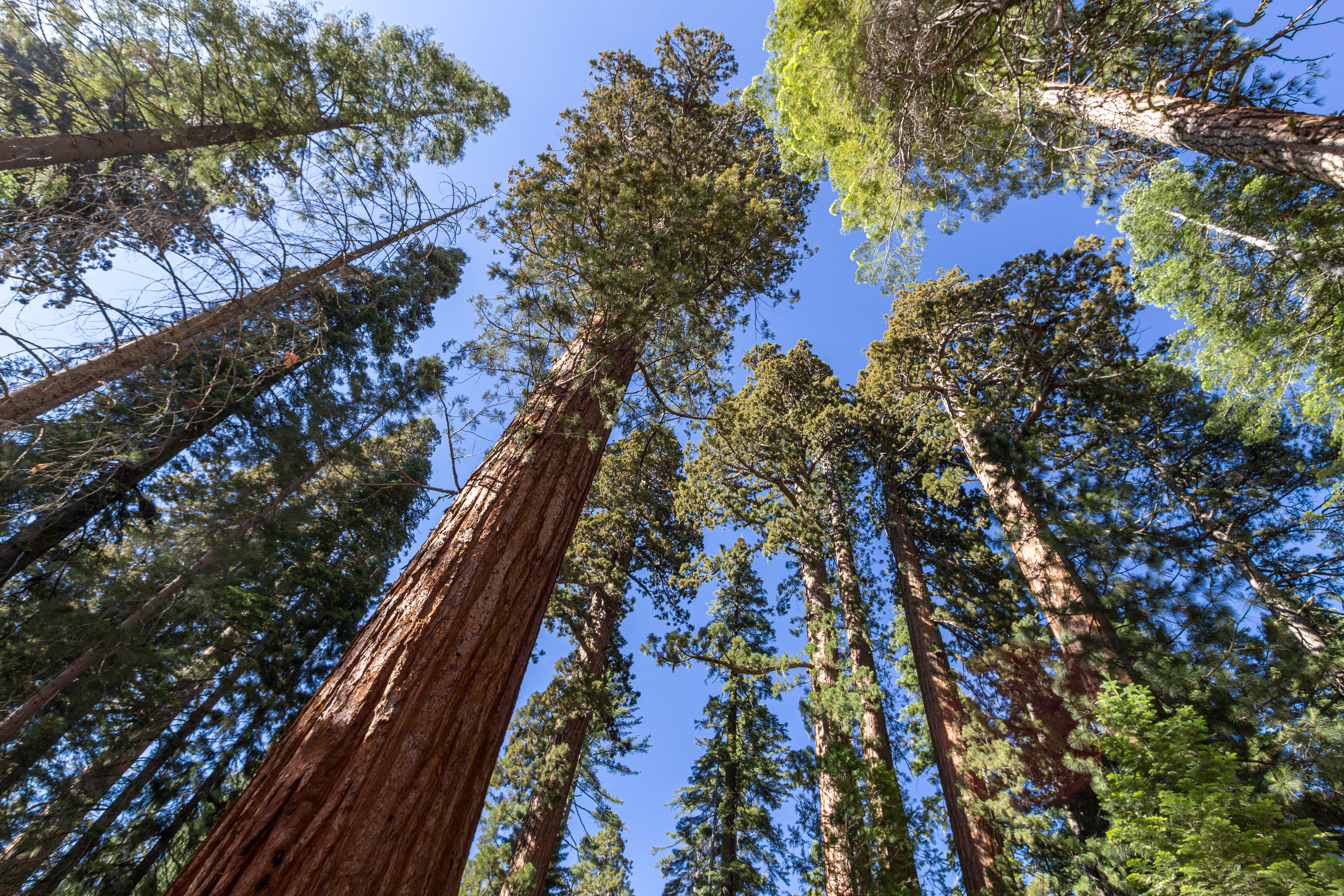
Mariposa Grove of Giant Sequoias, Yosemite National Park

In the United States, forest conservation is the practice of planning and maintaining forested areas for the benefit and sustainability of future generations. Forest conservation involves the upkeep of the natural resources within a forest that are beneficial for both humans and the ecosystem. Forests provide wildlife with a suitable habitat for living which allows the ecosystem to be biodiverse and benefit other natural processes. Forests also filter groundwater and prevent runoff keeping water safe for human consumption. There are many types of forests to consider and various techniques to preserve them. Each type of forest in the United States faces specific threats. However, there are various techniques to implement that will protect and preserve them.

Different types of forests have adapted throughout history, allowing them to thrive in specific habitats. Forests in the United States can be categorized into three main forest biomes, they are boreal, temperate, or sub-tropical based on the location and climate of the forest. Each of these biomes faces various threats of deforestation, urban development, soil compaction, species extinction, unmanaged recreational use, invasive species, or any combination of these threats. But there are many techniques that can be implemented for forest conservation efforts. This includes methods such as afforestation, reforestation, selective logging, controlled burns, wildland fire use, laws and policies, advocacy groups, and wildlife management areas. Additionally, multiple United States government programs support forest conservation efforts.

== History ==
The colonies imposed numerous laws regarding forests. After 1691 the British government imposed the Broad Arrow Policy in New England, by which pine trees suitable for the Royal Navy were branded and forbidden for settlers to use. The policy angered colonialists and the Pine Tree Riot of 1772 was one of the grievances of the American Revolution.

In 1891 the Forest Reserve Act was passed by Congress, after pressure from John Muir. It facilitated the formation of the National Forest System. After 1900, Gifford Pinchot led a movement of conservation. Pinchot made conservation a popular word in its application to natural resources. Throughout the next two decades, forestry professions became widespread. Following World War I, forestry became a cooperation between private landowners, the states, and the federal government. On March 21, 1933, U.S. President Franklin D. Roosevelt sent a message to the United States Congress to strengthen the United States' forest resources. In the following days, congress enacted the establishment of emergency conservation work. This project consisted of twenty-five thousand men working on forest protection by planting trees, watershed restoration, and erosion control. About 2.2 billion seedlings were planted which marked a start of conservation in the United States. In 1935, the Natural Resources Committee was created to understand, plan, and use natural resources. Following World War II, the first Smokey Bear symbol appeared on a poster to represent fire prevention cooperation. The Smokey Bear icon soon became one of the best advertisement icons in the United States. When people started to realize that the resources were not unlimited within the forests, conservation efforts began to start.

== Forest types ==
There are many different types of forests. The many types of forests are categorized by climate and location. 98% of forest cover in the United States is natural with the remaining 2% being plantation land. 33% of the United States is made up of forests. Out of the 33% of the U.S. covered by forests, 37% make up subtropical forests. 48% make up temperate forests. The remaining 15% consists of boreal forests.

=== Boreal ===
Boreal forests are found in the northern regions of the United States. Canada is made up of boreal forests. These forests have long cold winters and short cool summers. Precipitation can reach over 200 centimeters per year, typically in the form of snow. Because of the cold climate in the boreal forests, the growing season is three months long. Boreal forests are made up of evergreen trees, mosses, and lichens. Mosses are a plant species that thrive in moist areas. Mosses can tolerate dry periods as well by holding water and moisture in the dead leaves and cells. Lichens are organisms in the form of fungal filaments. Algae is a form of lichen in the boreal forests.

=== Temperate ===
Temperate forests are forests with high levels of precipitation. The yearly precipitation rate is between 20 and 60 inches in the form of rain or snow. Temperatures in temperate forests range from -22 degrees Fahrenheit to 86 degrees Fahrenheit. Temperate Forests within the United States are found in the Eastern region. Temperate forests can support a variety of species due to the large amount of rainfall. Mosses and lichens dominate the forest floor with medium-sized trees above such as dogwood trees. The top canopy is covered by larger trees such as maple trees, birch trees, and walnut trees.

=== Sub-tropical ===
Subtropical forests are found in the United States along the southern border states. These forests are made up of evergreen species and deciduous species. Evergreens are plant species that retain their leaves year round while deciduous trees lose their leaves annually. The consistent warm climate along with consistent rainfall promotes more plant growth than any other environment in the United States.

== Forest threats ==
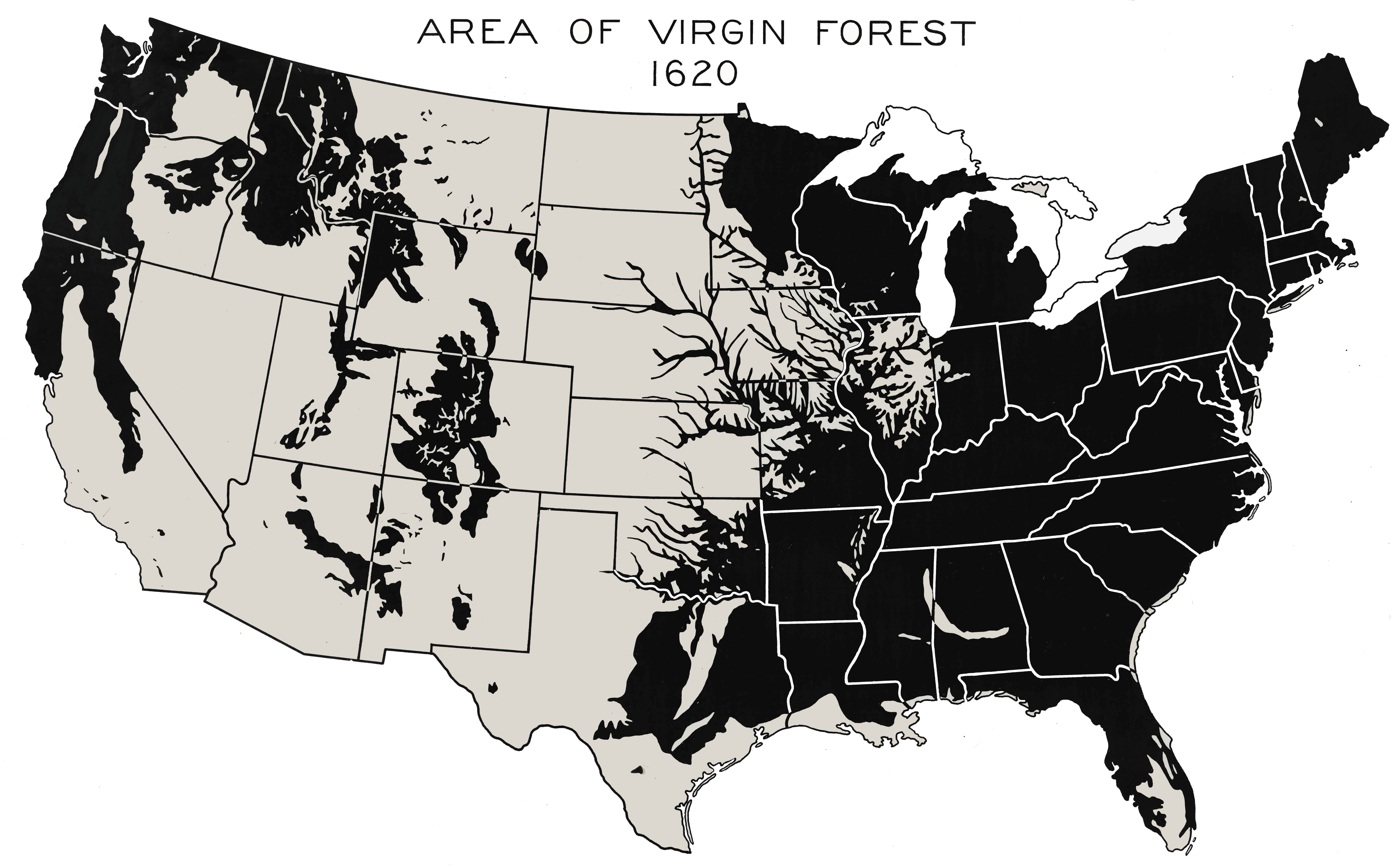
Above is an image of the coverage of untouched forests in the United States in the 1620s, before industrialization.

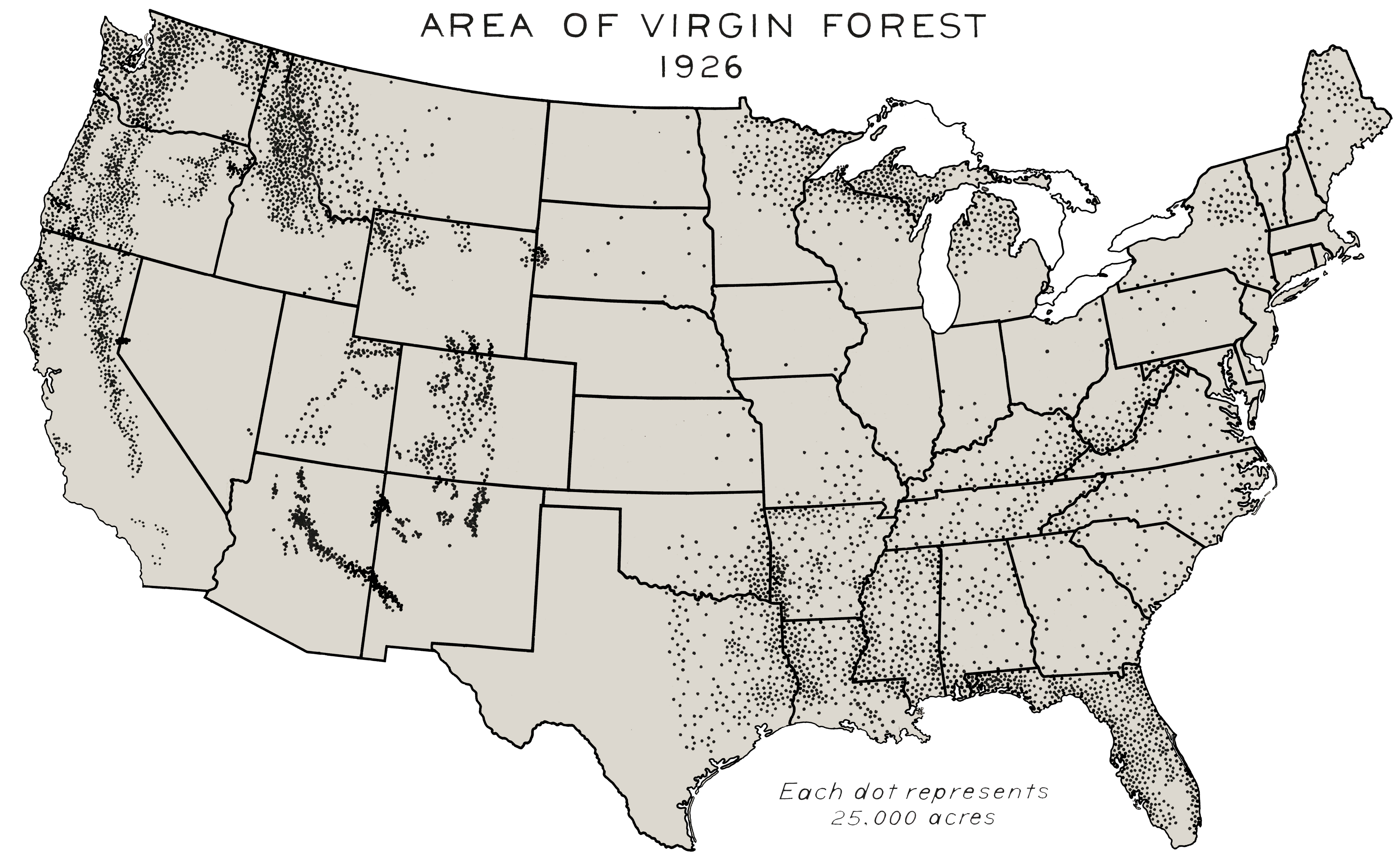
Here is the coverage of untouched forests in the United States in 1926. There is significantly less coverage since 1620 due to deforestation.

=== Deforestation ===
Deforestation is a threat to forests according to foresters. Deforestation is the permanent destruction of forests and woodlands. Deforestation is brought about by commercial logging, conversion of woodlands to agricultural land, and the felling of trees for firewood and building material. Commercial logging is the harvest of timber products for the profit that is gained from selling the product. Illegal logging is a threat to forests. Illegal logging is the harvest of timber for economic gain without permission. This method is a threat because it impedes plans and upkeep of a forest.

=== Urban development ===
Forests are lost to urban development and building projects. When forests are cleared for these reasons, it creates problems that foresters are concerned with. When heavy machinery is used to clear forests or develop land, the soil becomes compacted. When the soil is compacted, the soil particles are packed tightly together. Soil compaction results in water supply not being absorbed by tree roots and can be deadly to the growth of trees. Soil compaction also can create flooding. Compacted soil can not filter the groundwater into the soil, therefore water can build up on the surface creating flooding as a result.

=== Species extinction ===
Species extinction is another threat to our forests. With the removal of forests, animal and plant species suffer. Animal species can not survive without the adequate needs of their lifestyle. Animals need cover, food, and safe areas for the reproduction process. Altering their environment disrupts the life cycle of animal species and they are oftentimes not able to adapt. Food sources are lost to deforestation. Animal species tend to consume plant life to maintain themselves. With the removal of forests, this can result in animals not being able to find food to survive.

=== Unmanaged recreational use ===
Unmanaged recreational use is also a threat to forests. Unmanaged recreational use is the use of forested lands by the public at an uncontrolled rate. As recreational use has increased among forests, foresters have noticed an increase in land management that is needed. Invasive species threaten forest ecosystems. Invasive species are any species that is not native to that ecosystem and economic harm along with harm to the environment. Invasive species cause disruptions in the function of the ecosystem. These species not only affect the plants within a forest, but they can affect the animals within an ecosystem as well. The financial impact caused by invasive species is 138 billion dollars per year with economic loss and control costs.

== Techniques ==
Techniques of forest conservation are used to improve forested areas and to make the available resources sustainable.

=== Afforestation ===
Afforestation is a proactive method used to improve forests. Afforestation is the planting of trees for commercial purposes. The supply of wood and wood products from afforested areas has prevented the overuse and destruction of natural forests. Instead of taking resources from existing natural forests, afforestation is a process used to plant trees and use them as resources instead of naturally existing forests. Afforestation occurs when the planting of trees is introduced to an area that previously had no trees. This creates habitat for wildlife, recreational areas, and commercial use while not causing harm to natural forests.

=== Reforestation ===
Reforestation is another method to sustain forests by improving existing forested areas. Reforestation is a method of planting trees in an existing forested area. This method is used in reaction to deforestation. When forests are removed without reestablishment they can be reforested by planting trees in the same area to rebuild the existing forest. The restoration of forests is considered to be crucial to fighting climate change and to conserving global diversity. There are many places where reforestation is off-limits such as productive croplands and cities. New forests can help cool down the climate as well as reduce the amount of carbon dioxide in the atmosphere depending on how large the area the new forests are in.

=== Selective logging ===
Selective logging is another method used to meet the needs of both the forests and humans seeking economic resources. Selective logging is the removal of trees within a stand based on size limitations. This technique allows for forest regeneration to occur between and after the selective harvest cycles.

=== Controlled burns and wildland fire use ===
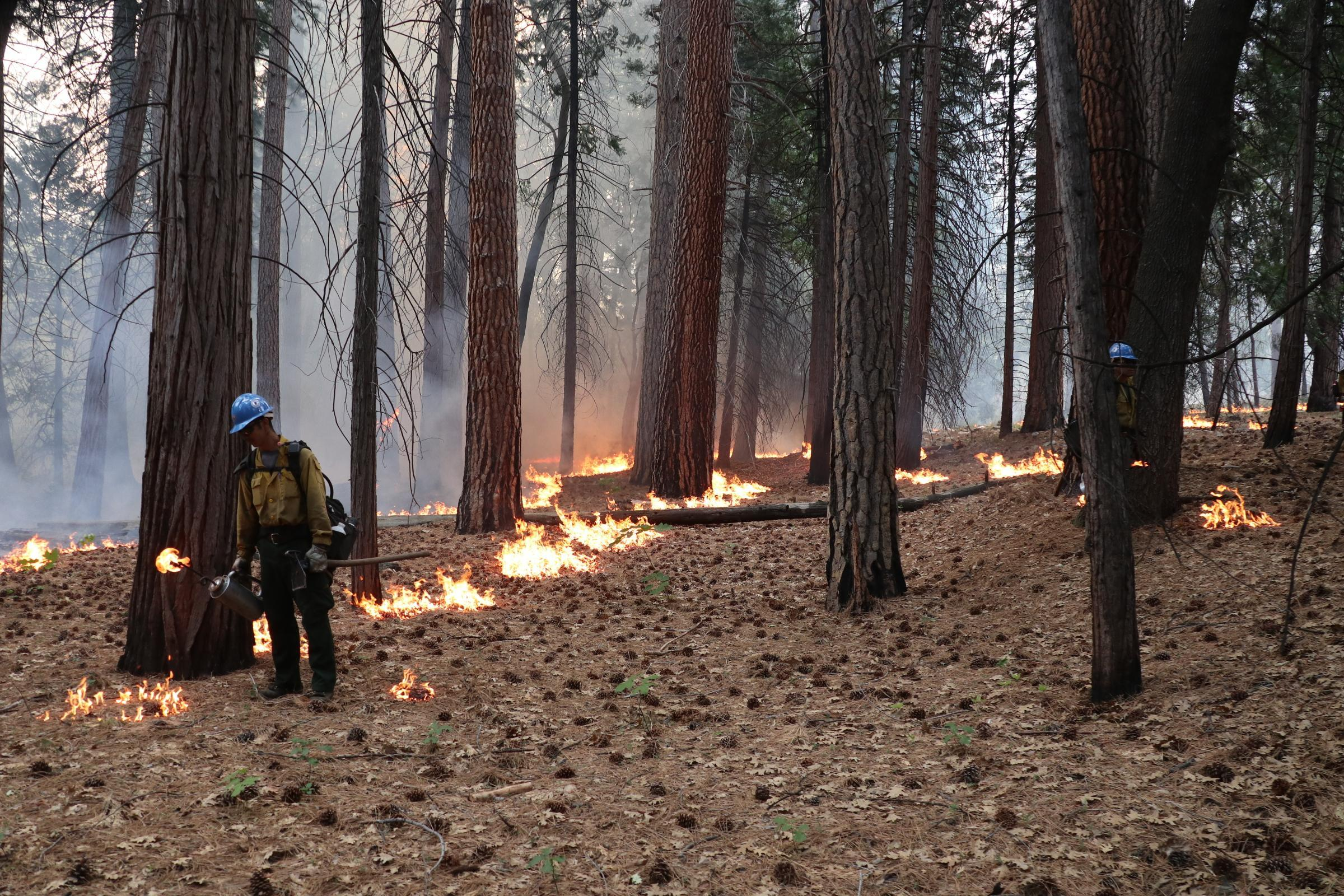
Above is an example of a controlled burn as a technique to preserve forests. Fire is used to restore the undergrowth of a forest and stimulate the germination of new tree species.

Although it can be threatening if it is not controlled, fire is a successful way to conserve forest resources. Controlled burn is a technique that is used to manage forests. Fire can be highly beneficial to the ecosystems within a forest. It renews the forest undergrowth and also stimulates the germination of tree species. In some species of trees, such as the Sequoia, seedlings remain dormant until broken by fire. As a result, these species can not reproduce without fire. Wildland fire use, particularly controlled burns, is an intentional fire to improve the health of a forest. These fire cycles help maintain the diversity of habitats for all species in an ecosystem. These fires also save on suppression costs of fires. Suppression costs are the costs caused by wildfires that are not prescribed. Wildland fire use can help reduce taxpayer costs in the immediate future too

=== Laws and policies ===
Policies to minimize the loss of forests and to increase public involvement, such as the National Forest Management Act (NFMA) of 1976, have been implemented in the United States. The NFMA serves to determine the parts of National Forests that can be used for certain purposes (roads and recreation) and which areas are safe from destruction. Many laws were created in the 1900s such as the Bankhead–Jones Farm Tenant Act of 1937, which guides the Secretary of Agriculture to work on programs relating to land conservation and the utilization to correct errors in land use. In turn, this act helps the control of soil erosion, reforestation, preservation of natural resources, and the protection of natural resources and ecosystems. Then, in 1960, the Multiple-Use Sustained-Yield Act was created, addressing the establishment and administration of national forests that can be sustainably used for human usage. The National Environmental Policy Act (NEPA) was created in 1970 setting a new goal for America. After decades of environmental neglect, this law was created to better the general good and conditions under which humans and nature can coexist in harmony while still satisfying the social, economic, and other needs that Americans will need in both the present and the future. In 1970, the Clean Air Act was made and as a part of an environmental law; this act creates national standards for air pollutants and regulates pollution sources. Two years later in 1972, the Clean Water Act was created setting the basic system up for regulating pollutants entering U.S. waters. Then, in 1976 the NFMA was created, amending the Forest and Rangeland Resources Planning Act of 1975 recognizing that the management of the U.S.' renewable resources has many parts to it and those parts are likely to change over time. The goal of this act is to develop and prepare national renewable resources and programs that can be periodically reviewed and updated to meet current standards.

=== Advocacy groups ===
The main advocacy group for United States Forests is the National Forest Foundation. This group works to build connections between people and National Forests through education, opportunities, and events. Another group is the National Parks Conservation Association. This group's mission is to protect and better the National Park Systems in the United States for the present and the future. This group covers news articles, issues, ways to be involved, where to find national parks, and the impact they have made in the past century.

=== Wildlife management areas ===
State departments of natural resources and conservation develop, maintain, and manage public lands across the nation. Special regulations and rules apply to all wildlife management areas across the United States. Wildlife management areas are accessible to the public for many recreational uses. Hunters and campers enjoy the land to harvest wild game on a legal basis. Hunting is permitted in wildlife management areas but there are rules and regulations. A valid hunting license is required, and often a wildlife management area land use permit is also required. Along with public use of the wildlife management areas, State departments of natural resources provide necessary management to upkeep the land. The management techniques within a wildlife management area include developing a habitat for wildlife along with conserving natural land resources. Land resources within a wildlife management area are conserved by not allowing the harvest of tree species or alteration of the land in any way.

== Government Programs ==
=== Great American Outdoors Act (GAOA) ===
This program was passed in 2020 with bipartisan support and goals of funding conservation lands as well as the infrastructure on recreational lands. There are two main components of the GAOA, one being concrete support for the Land and Water Conservation Fund. The other is to initiate the National Parks and Public Land Legacy Restoration Fund, which has an annual budget of $1.9 billion. State agencies can request funding for projects that approach conservation and environmental protection simultaneously with public access. Funding is also provided to projects that address increasing diversity and inclusion of visitors. This addresses economic, ethnic, and racial inequalities while improving equity by increasing access to public lands for communities that have been historically excluded from outdoor recreation. The GAOA is designed to revisit prior systems that have underserved communities and revise them to increase diversity, equity, and inclusion.

=== Land and Water Conservation Fund (LWCF) ===
The Land and Water Conservation Fund Act was enacted in 1965 to support the health of United States citizens by ensuring access to the outdoors while preserving and developing lands. This law generated a fund in the U.S. Treasury as a source to achieve outdoor recreation goals. Today, the majority of the revenue for the LWCF is from oil and gas leasing in the Outer Continental Shelf. Each year, the United States Congress will determine how much funding is to be allocated to serve three purposes. The first is purchasing land for federal agencies such as the Bureau of Land Management, Fish and Wildlife Service, the National Park Service, and the U.S. Forest Service to support outdoor recreation. Second, the funds are part of a matching grant program that supports states in managing recreational facilities and lands. The funds are spread throughout the states based on priority of projects and whatever is left over gets spread to states based on need. There is also a competitive state grant program where projects must meet certain criteria to get the money. The third purpose is to fund other federal programs such as the Forestry Legacy Program and the Cooperative Endangered Species Conservation Fund that share similar objectives.

=== Inflation Reduction Act (IRA) ===
The Inflation Reduction Act law was passed in 2022 as a commitment to invest in clean energy and climate action over ten years of funding. Forestry efforts, like large tree plantings, around the country to sequester carbon in the atmosphere receive $2.2 billion. Also, the U.S. Forest Service has awarded states and territories $250 million to ensure equitable access to trees for urban communities. This will eventually be increased to $1 billion to continue funding grants that support projects emphasizing equitable access to green spaces or forests within urban communities. Funding is also available for Forest Landowner Support, providing $450 million in grants to underserved owners or those who have small acreage and work to mitigate climate change and/or bring focus to forest resilience. $700 million worth of funds are allocated to the Forestry Legacy Program that states and land trusts use to purchase areas so they do not get developed. To preserve biodiversity, $50 million is being used to protect old-growth forests. And $1.8 billion is for projects that reduce hazardous fuels in national forests, specifically out West. This will restore forests and minimize wildfire risk, it is done by managing vegetation that carries and encourages wildfires to prevent them from destroying communities.

== See also ==
- Forest § United States
- Forest management § United States
- List of types of formally designated forests
- Broad Arrow Policy, in colonial era
