= Head v. Amoskeag Manufacturing Co. =

Head v. Amoskeag Mfg. Co.
- Supreme Court of the United States

Argued December 16–17, 1884 Decided January 5, 1885
- Full case name: Head v. Amoskeag Mfg. Co.
- Citations: 113 U.S. 9 (more) 5 S. Ct. 441; 28 L. Ed. 889; 1885 U.S. LEXIS 1646

Court membership
- Chief Justice Morrison Waite Associate Justices Samuel F. Miller · Stephen J. Field; Joseph P. Bradley · John M. Harlan; William B. Woods · Stanley Matthews; Horace Gray · Samuel Blatchford

Case opinion
- Majority: Gray, joined by Waite, Miller, Field, Bradley, Harlan, Woods, Matthews
- Blatchford took no part in the consideration or decision of the case.

Head v. Amoskeag Mfg. Co., 113 U.S. 9 (1885), was a U.S. Supreme Court case considering whether a dam constructed on privately owned land served a public purpose and whether having the owner of the dam compensate any adjacent landowner was a legal form of eminent domain.

== Background ==
The state of New Hampshire passed a General Mills Act in 1868 which established a permitting process for companies to build dams on non-navigable waterways so long as they compensated any adjacent landowners for flooded property. The Amoskeag Manufacturing Company dammed the Merrimack River at Amoskeag Falls for the purpose of powering their cotton mills. This had the inadvertent result of flooding Head's land along the river for which he was offered compensation.

Head sued claiming the benefit to the company was not a public purpose and that the Equal Protection Clause was being violated because the rights of a major employer was outweighing those of a smaller landowner. When the New Hampshire Supreme Court ruled that the dam was legal, Head appealed to the federal courts for a writ of error to reverse the judgment.

== Decision ==
Justice Horace Gray, delivered the opinion of the court that regulating riparian water rights was clearly within the purview of the state, that similar regulations were used in other states, that similar laws in New Hampshire went back to 1718, and that the remedy for any financial loss showed that due process of law was being preserved. The court did not find the equal protection claims compelling. Therefore, the court ruled in favor of the Amoskeag Manufacturing Company.

Justice Samuel Blatchford did not participate in the case.
