= Samuel Blodgett =

American industrialist and financier (1724–1807)

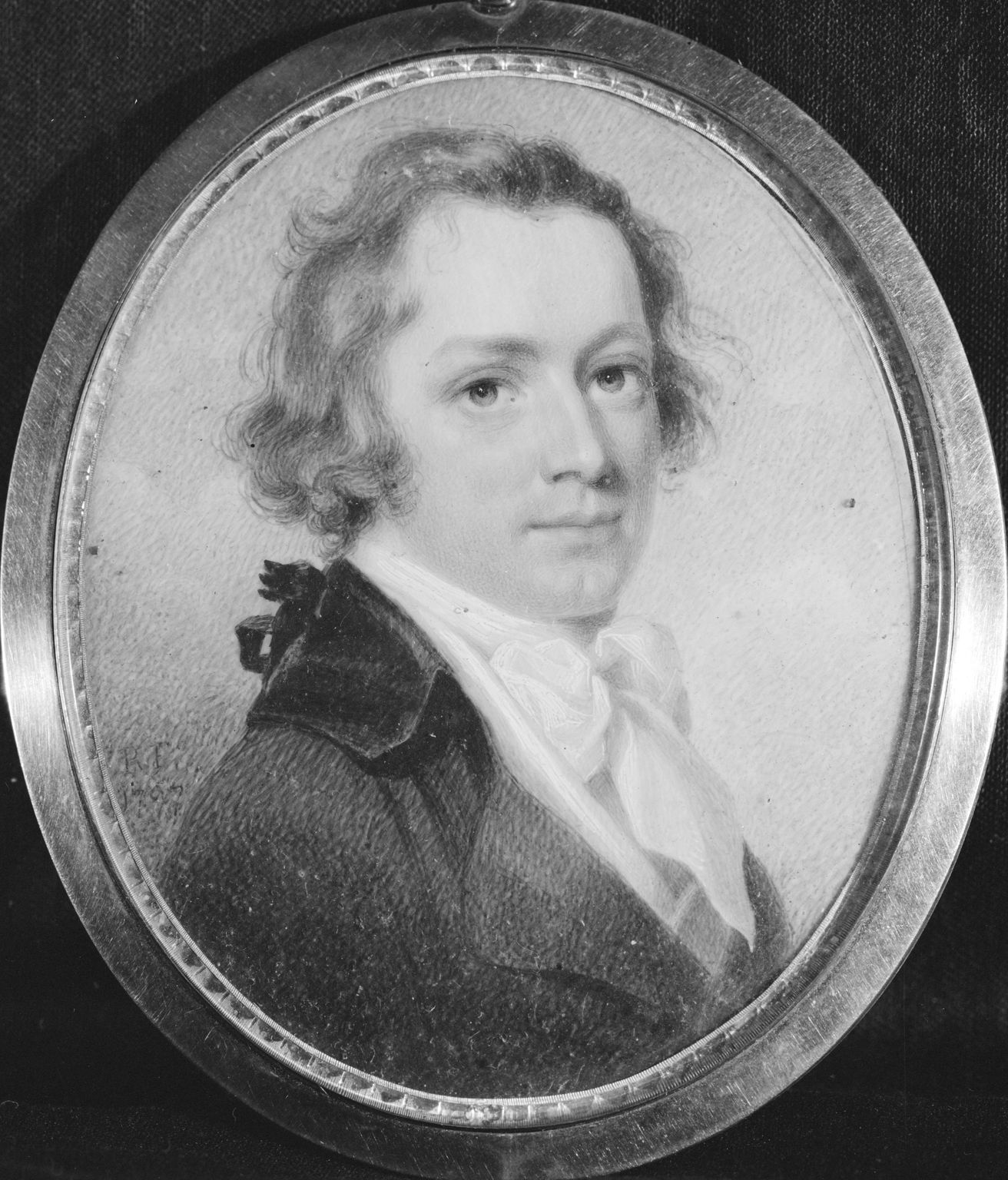
- Portrait of Blodgett by Robert Field
- Born: April 1, 1724; Woburn, Province of Massachusetts Bay
- Died: September 1, 1807 (aged 83); Manchester, New Hampshire, U.S.
- Occupations: Lawyer, industrialist, and financier
- Known for: Founding the city of Manchester, New Hampshire

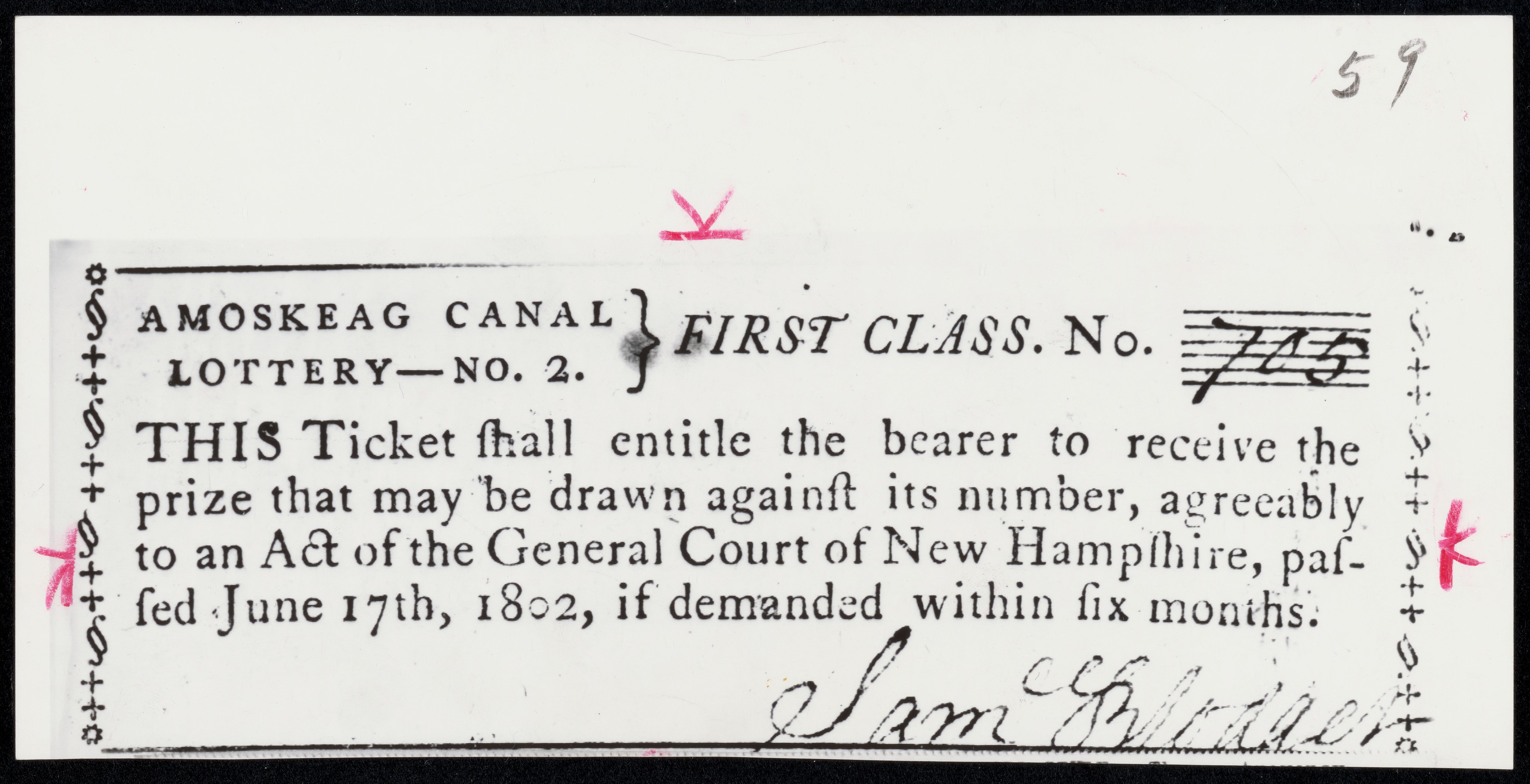
Amoskeag Canal lottery ticket, signed by Judge Samuel Blodgett

Samuel Blodgett (April 1, 1724 – September 1, 1807) (sometimes spelled Blodget, and sometimes Samuel Blodgett Sr. to distinguish him from descendants with the same name) was an early American lawyer, industrialist, and financier who founded the city of Manchester, New Hampshire.

As a lawyer, Blodgett served as a mediator between the sides in the Pine Tree Riot, getting a settlement from anti-Crown mill owners who had hired him to represent their case against the Royalist governor of New Hampshire John Wentworth in 1772. During the American Revolutionary War he firmly supported the patriot cause.

In 1807, Blodgett built a canal around Amoskeag Falls to aid in navigation of ships traveling up and down the Merrimack River. He pushed for the renaming of the small rural town of Derryfield, New Hampshire to Manchester, in honor of Manchester in England, a well-known textile-manufacturing center. The renaming of the town, at Blodgett's behest, coincided with the founding of the Amoskeag Mills by his friend and fellow industrialist Benjamin Prichard. The town would later be incorporated as a city and become the most populous city in the state of New Hampshire.

== Family ==
His son, Samuel Blodgett Jr., was similarly important in the foundation of Washington, D.C. as the national capital. Having previously served on George Washington's staff during the Revolutionary War, Samuel Jr. served as the chairman of the board of commissioners tasked with designing the capital city, and he also used his wealth to finance the construction of both the U.S. Capitol and the White House.
