= Pine Tree Riot =

1772 event

- Part of the American Revolution
- Date: April 14, 1772
- Location: Weare, New Hampshire
- Caused by: Authoritarianism
- Methods: Rioting

Parties
New Hampshire	Great Britain

The Pine Tree Flag is a flag which was often used in the American Revolution and modern day activists as a symbol to oppose tyranny. It was inspired by the Pine Tree Riot.

The Pine Tree Riot was an act of resistance to British royal authority undertaken by American colonists in Weare, New Hampshire, on April 14, 1772, placing it among the disputes between Crown and colonists that culminated in the American Revolution.

In 1722, under the Broad Arrow Policy it became illegal to cut down white pine trees larger than 12 inches in diameter in New Hampshire in order to reserve them for use as Royal Navy masts. This law was not strictly enforced until 1766, when Governor John Wentworth began enforcing it.

On April 13, 1772, Sheriff Benjamin Whiting and Deputy John Quigley discovered a sawmill in Weare, New Hampshire, violating this law. They arrested the leader, Ebenezer Mudgett, and released him on bail. The next day, Mudgett and twenty men attacked the Sheriff and Deputy at the Quimby Inn, beating them nearly to death with large rods and sending them out of town on horseback. Some credit this incident with inspiring the Boston Tea Party, which significantly contributed to the start of the American Revolutionary War.

== Mast pines ==
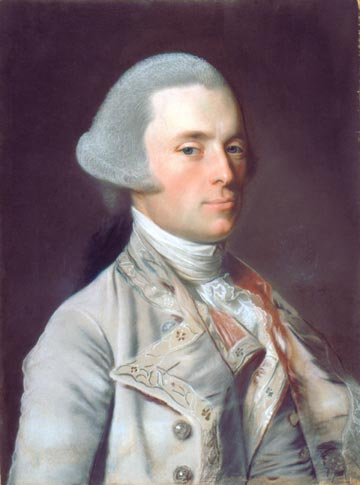
Sir John Wentworth, 1st Baronet

By the late 17th century, the Royal Navy's demands left few trees in Britain suitable for use as large spars. Eastern white pines from colonial New England were superior timber for the single-stick masts and booms of the day. In order to preserve suitable timber for the Royal Navy, the New Hampshire General Court passed an act on May 10, 1708, to preserve all trees in the Province of New Hampshire suitable for masts for use by the Royal Navy. The act replicated a 1691 law in England and declared all pines with diameter greater than 24 inches (61 cm) to be property of the Crown. Violators faced a fine of 50 pounds for each illegally harvested tree. In 1722, a new law reduced the diameter to 12 inches (30 cm). "Surveyors of the King's Woods" were assigned by the Crown to identify all suitable "mast pines" with the broad arrow wherever they were found.

The laws were met with growing discontent in the colonies and resulted in a series of demonstrations and riots through the 1700s. One such example, the Mast Tree Riot, occurred in 1734 in what is now Fremont, New Hampshire when a surveyor-general visited the town to inspect felled lumber and was forced to leave by local settlers who disguised themselves as Native Americans. The 1722 law was not strictly enforced until John Wentworth was appointed as the governor of New Hampshire in 1766. Although often sympathetic to the colonists, he held firm on this issue.

== Pine Tree Riot ==
John Sherman, Deputy Surveyor of New Hampshire, ordered a search of sawmills in 1771–1772 for white pine marked for the Crown. His men found that six mills in Goffstown and Weare possessed large white pines and marked them with the broad arrow to indicate that they were Crown property. The owners of the mills were named as offenders in the February 7, 1772, edition of The New Hampshire Gazette. The mill owners hired lawyer Samuel Blodgett to represent them, who met with Governor Wentworth. When the governor offered Blodgett the job of Surveyor of the King's Woods, he accepted, and, rather than getting the charges dropped, he instructed his clients to pay a settlement. The mill owners from Goffstown paid their fines at once and had their logs returned to them. Those from Weare refused to pay.

On April 13, 1772, Benjamin Whiting, Sheriff of Hillsborough County, and his Deputy John Quigley were sent to South Weare with a warrant to arrest the leader of the Weare mill owners, Ebenezer Mudgett. Mudgett was subsequently released with the understanding that he would provide bail in the morning. The sheriff and deputy spent the night at Aaron Quimby's inn, the Pine Tree Tavern. That night, many of the townsmen gathered at Mudgett's house. A few offered to help pay his bail, but the majority wanted to run the sheriff and deputy out of town. They decided to physically assault Whiting in his sleep and abuse Whiting's horses by maiming their faces.

At dawn the next day Mudgett led between 20 and 30-40 men to the tavern. Whiting was still in bed, and Mudgett burst in on him. With their faces blackened with soot for disguise, more than 20 townsmen rushed into Whiting's room. They began to beat him with tree branch switches, giving one lash for every tree being contested. The sheriff tried to grab his pistols, but he was thoroughly outnumbered. Rioters grabbed him by his arms and legs, hoisted him up, face to the floor, while others continued to mercilessly assault him with tree switches. Whiting later reported that he thought the men would surely kill him. Quigley was also pulled from his room and received the same treatment from another group of townsmen. The sheriff and deputy's horses were brought around to the inn door. The rioters then cut off the ears and shaved the manes and tails of the horses, after which Whiting and Quigley were forced to ride out of town through a gauntlet of jeering townspeople, shouted at and slapped down the road towards Goffstown.

Whiting engaged Colonel Moore of Bedford and Edward Goldstone Lutwyche of Merrimack, who assembled a posse of soldiers to arrest the perpetrators. The rioters ran and hid in the woods before the posse arrived. One of the men suspected of assaulting Whiting in his sleep was located, arrested, and revealed the names of the others involved. Eight men were ordered to post bail and appear in court to answer charges of rioting, disturbing the peace, and "making an assault upon the body of Benjamin Whiting." None of the men were charged with animal cruelty. Four judges, Theodore Atkinson, Meshech Weare, Leverett Hubbard, and William Parker, heard the case in the Superior Court in Amherst in September 1772. The rioters pleaded guilty, and the judges fined them 20 shillings each and ordered them to pay the cost of the court hearing.

== Following events ==
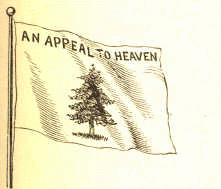
Pine Tree Flag with the motto "An Appeal to Heaven"

The riot resulted in only light fines being exacted against the rioters by colonial authorities. By demonstrating that British policies were defiable, the riot may have helped to inspire the Boston Tea Party in 1773. The first Pine Tree Flag flown by colonists during the riot was red with a pine tree within a white square in the upper left corner.

Of the men charged, Timothy Worthley, Jonathan Worthley and William Dustin fought on the American side in the American Revolutionary War, as did even Samuel Blodgett. Benjamin Whiting fought for the British and had his land confiscated as a Loyalist. Meshech Weare, one of the judges, assisted in framing the New Hampshire constitution adopted in 1776, establishing its own government, and becoming the first colony to declare its independence; Weare became the first president of New Hampshire.

Samuel Blodgett went on to construct the first canal around the Amoskeag Falls on the Merrimack River in Derryfield, completed shortly before his death in 1807. In 1810, the town of Derryfield changed its name to Manchester, New Hampshire in honor of Blodgett's vision that the Amoskeag Falls would someday power a manufacturing center to rival Manchester in England. Blodget Street in Manchester, New Hampshire is named in his honor.

== Participants ==
- John Sherburn – Deputy Surveyor
- Samuel Blodgett – lawyer and later Surveyor
- Benjamin Whiting – County Sheriff
- John Quigley – Deputy Sheriff
- Aaron Quimby – owner of the Pine Tree Tavern
- Ebenezer Mudgett – leader of sawmill owners in Weare, rioter
- Colonel Moore – head of a regiment that marched to Weare
- Colonel Edward Goldstone Lutwyche – head of a regiment that marched to Weare
- Timothy Worthley – resident of Weare, rioter
- Jonathan Worthley – resident of Weare, rioter
- Caleb Atwood – resident of Weare, rioter
- William Dustin – resident of Weare, rioter
- Abraham Johnson – resident of Weare, rioter
- Jotham Tuttle – resident of Weare, rioter
- William Quimby – resident of Weare, rioter and brother of Aaron Quimby
- Honorable Theodore Atkinson – Chief Justice
- Honorable Meshech Weare – Justice
- Honorable Leverett Hubbard – Justice
- Honorable William Parker – Justice

== Contemporary usage ==
In 2015, the book An Appeal to Heaven by Dutch Sheets was published. As Sheets records, the Pine Tree Flag used during the riots has increased in popularity recently, making "...its way into countless homes, prayer rooms, and even government buildings."

Since 2019, a Professional Disc Golf Association (PDGA) sanctioned disc golf tournament named "The Pine Tree Riot" has been held at Salmon Falls disc golf course in Rochester, New Hampshire.

On April 9, 2022, the Weare Historical Society hosted the Pine Tree Riot 250th Anniversary Commemoration and Celebration.

== See also ==
- Broad Arrow Policy
- New Hampshire Historical Marker No. 142: Mast Tree Riot of 1734, which took place in Fremont, New Hampshire
