= Eunice Connolly =

- Born: Eunice Louensa Richardson; December 9, 1831; Northfield, Franklin County, Massachusetts
- Died: September 27, 1877 (aged 45) off the Miskito Cays near coastal Nicaragua
- Other names: Eunice Conolly, Eunice Richardson Stone Connolly, Eunice Stone

Eunice Connolly (December 9, 1831 – September 27, 1877) was an American woman born into pre-Civil War-New England, who left a correspondence archive detailing her life during the period. From a working-class family, she labored in textile mills and as a housekeeper and laundress, when her husband was unable to find work. Hoping for a better life, they moved to Mobile, Alabama, but when the Civil War broke out and her husband joined the Confederacy, Eunice returned to New England. Lack of word or financial support from her spouse, led Connolly into poverty as she struggled to provide for their two children. Learning after the war ended that he had died, Connolly decided to marry a "coloured" British West Indian sailor and move with him to the Cayman Islands. The letters she left, give a glimpse into the struggles of working class life during the period of industrialization and the war, as well as the differences in racial attitudes of American and Caribbean societies.

== Early life ==
Eunice Louensa Richardson was born on December 9, 1831, in Northfield, Franklin County, Massachusetts, to Lois (née Wright) and Luther Richardson, Sr. She was the third daughter in the family after Ann and Harriet, and was followed by Jane, Adelia, Luther Jr. and Charles Henry. In the 1845, her family relocated to Manchester, New Hampshire, seeking a more stable income source in the factory town. Richardson went to work in the Amoskeag Textile Mills. On October 21, 1849, Richardson married William C. Stone, a carpenter. The couple initially made their home with Eunice's parents. In 1851, her father left Manchester seeking work and did not return to the family.

== New England ==
In 1852, after giving birth to their first child, Clarence, the couple moved to a home of their own. By 1857, the couple had acquired a small plot of land in Manchester, but the Panic of 1857 made it difficult for William to provide a living. By 1859, the inability to find steady work, forced him to join family in Alabama, leaving Eunice and Clarence in New Hampshire, where she returned to work in the Amoskeag Mill. Because female employees lived in mill housing which did not accommodate children, Stone was forced to send her son to live with a widow, Mehitable Quimby, who lived in West Manchester. Despite the racial tensions in the south on the eve of the Civil War, she embarked in June 1860 with her son, to join William in Mobile.

== Mobile, Alabama ==
Initially upon their arrival, the family boarded with William's sister and brother-in-law, Ellen and Dudley Merrill, soon establishing their own residence in Mobile. When the war broke out, Stone's brothers Luther and Henry joined the Union Army, but her brother-in-law and husband joined the Confederate forces. Stone, who was strongly behind the Union chose to return to New England embarking with her son on the arduous journey in December 1861. She arrived in Claremont, New Hampshire, with expectations that her husband's family would provide for her and her son, as well as her daughter, Clara, who would be born within two months of her return northward.

== Return to New England ==
To pay for their upkeep, Clarence performed chores for her brother-in-law's family to earn his room and board and Stone hired out as a servant. She also made extra money by braiding palm leaf hats and was eventually able to move the children into a tenement building living on their own. Without education, and with children being barred from mill dormitories and domestic living situations, Stone's remaining choice was to take in washing and take Clara with her to housekeeping jobs, though societal norms called into question the respectability of women engaged in such work. Living on the edge of poverty, Stone periodically had to send Clarence to work for relatives. Unknown to Stone, William died in Atlanta on February 11, 1863 and she struggled on despite wartime inflation and lack of work.

In December 1864, she moved to Dracut, Massachusetts, where her mother was then living. Working as a seamstress and laundress in Lowell, she battled depression. After the war ended and Lincoln's assassination, Stone received a letter from her sister-in-law Ellen Merrill advising her of her husband's death. Late in 1865, she and the children left her mother's and moved back in with William's family, who were at that time living in Vermont. Settling in Morristown, she hired Clarence out as a farm laborer, while she did cleaning and washing for neighbors and kin. When or where Stone met Smiley Connolly, a mulatto sailor from the British West Indies colony of the Cayman Islands is unclear. Having already pushed the boundaries of respectability, being poor, husbandless and working class, her engagement to Connolly in 1869, pushed her into being a social outcast, though her immediate family was supportive because of Connolly's ability to provide for her and the children.

== Cayman Islands ==
Knowing that marriage to William S. Connolly would mean separation from her family, because of the post-war feeling regarding interracial marriage, Stone chose to marry on 3 November 1869 in Dracut. Within a week of their marriage, the couple and Connolly's children sailed from Cape Cod en route to the West Indies. The family settled in the village of East End on Grand Cayman. By 1871, Connolly and Smiley had a daughter, Louisa Charlotta, whom they called Lou, and later had a second daughter named Caramiel. She corresponded regularly with her family relaying her new found happiness and contentment. She embraced his three sons from a previous marriage Gamaliel, Cornelius and Jarrett, and did not seem bothered by the fact that their mother, Rachel Partridge Connolly could not have secured a divorce in the Cayman Islands from Smiley, as divorce was illegal until the 1880s. Smiley, having given up sailing at Eunice's request, was a carpenter and built boats from the local hardwood. He also owned land, which they planted.

The family lived in a wattle and daub cottage near the sea and Connolly had a woman who helped her with the housework and another who did the laundry. In the West Indies, though Smiley was mixed race, the social hierarchy placed "coloured" closer to white, the opposite of in the United States, where "mulattos" were considered black. As such, the Connolly's were part of the middle class and were able to afford to send Clara to school full-time. Clarence by this time was working as a teacher at the church-run school in East End. His death in 1872, caused his mother to suffer another bout of depression.

In 1875, Smiley completed a schooner, The Leader, which he had been building and reiterated his promise to Connolly he would not sail unless she and the children accompanied him. In 1876 a hurricane hit Grand Cayman in mid-October and though much damage occurred, the couple's new home was spared. The disaster brought back to Connolly's mind the uncertainty she had experienced over her first husband's whereabouts during the war, and when Smiley decided to join a turtle-fishing voyage to the Miskito Cays, she insisted that the family join him. In the Autumn of 1877, the family boarded The Leader heading to Nicaragua. A hurricane struck near the Windward Islands between September 21 and October 5, 1877. Survivors who made it back to the Cayman Islands on October 8, reported that sixty-six lives had been lost in the storm.

== Death and legacy ==
Connolly's family did not learn of the family's death until 1881. Replying to a query the family had sent in search of word, a letter reached Ellen Merrill from John S. Wood of Kingston, Jamaica. He reported that the three daughters, Eunice and Smiley, along with six crewmen all perished in the hurricane on 27 September 1877. Historian Martha Hodes discovered Eunice's correspondence while conducting research among her mother's papers at the Duke University Library. Intrigued by the 500 letters preserved, she researched Connolly's life, publishing her biography, The Sea Captain's Wife in 2007. The letters capture the fragility and volatility of life in the era and show that Connolly was able to challenge convention by improving her social standing when she married a black man. Many of the Caribbean branches of Connolly, some spell it Conolly, are related to Smiley and Eunice, including William Warren Conolly, who was the great-grandson of Smiley's brother Thomas Dighton Conolly
