= Broad Arrow Policy =

1691 English policy reserving colonial trees

The broad arrow symbol stamped on trees

The Broad Arrow Policy was a policy implemented by the English Crown in 1691 to preserve tall trees in England's North American colonies which were of critical use for the Royal Navy. It applied to Massachusetts from 1691. It was extended to New Hampshire (1698); New England, New York, and New Jersey (1711); and Nova Scotia (1721). Colonial sentiment was largely opposed to the policy and it was one of the grievances that led to the American Revolution.

The Pine Tree Flag is a flag which was often used in the American Revolution and modern day libertarian activists as a symbol to oppose tyranny. It was inspired by the Pine Tree Riot.

The broad arrow symbol was used by colonial authorities to mark trees (especially the eastern white pine) intended for ship building use. Three axe strikes, resembling an arrowhead and shaft, were marked on large mast-grade trees. Use of the broad arrow mark commenced in earnest in 1691 with the Massachusetts Charter, which contained a Mast Preservation Clause specifying:

... for better providing and furnishing of Masts for our Royal Navy wee do hereby reserve to us ... ALL trees of the diameter of 24 inches and upward at 12 inches from the ground, growing upon any soils or tracts of land within our said Province or Territory not heretofore granted to any private person. We...forbid all persons whatsoever from felling, cutting or destroying any such trees without the royal license from us.

Initially England imported its mast trees from the Baltic states, but it was an expensive, lengthy and politically treacherous proposition. Much of British naval policy at the time revolved around keeping the trade route to the Baltics open. With Baltic timber becoming less appealing to use, the Admiralty's eye turned towards the Colonies. Colonists paid little attention to the Charter's Mast Preservation Clause, and tree harvesting increased with disregard for broad arrow protected trees. However, as Baltic imports decreased, the British timber trade increasingly depended on North American trees, and enforcement of broad arrow policies increased. Persons appointed to the position of Surveyor-General of His Majesty's Woods were responsible for selecting, marking and recording trees as well as policing and enforcing the unlicensed cutting of protected trees. This process was open to abuse, and the naval monopoly on the trees was very unpopular with colonists. Part of the reason was that many protected trees were on either town-owned or privately owned lands.

Colonists could only sell mast trees to colonial or Crown authorities for naval use, but were substantially underpaid for the lumber. Even though it was illegal for colonists to trade with enemies of the Crown, both the French and the Spanish were in the market for mast trees as well and would pay a much better price. Acts of Parliament in 1711, 1722 and the 1772 Timber for the Navy Act extended protection finally to 12-inch-diameter (300 mm) trees and resulted in the Pine Tree Riot that same year. This was one of the first acts of rebellion by colonists in the run-up to the American Revolutionary War in 1775, and a flag bearing a white pine was flown at the Battle of Bunker Hill.

== See also ==
- Forest conservation in the United States
