= Amoskeag Manufacturing Company =

American business (1810–1935)

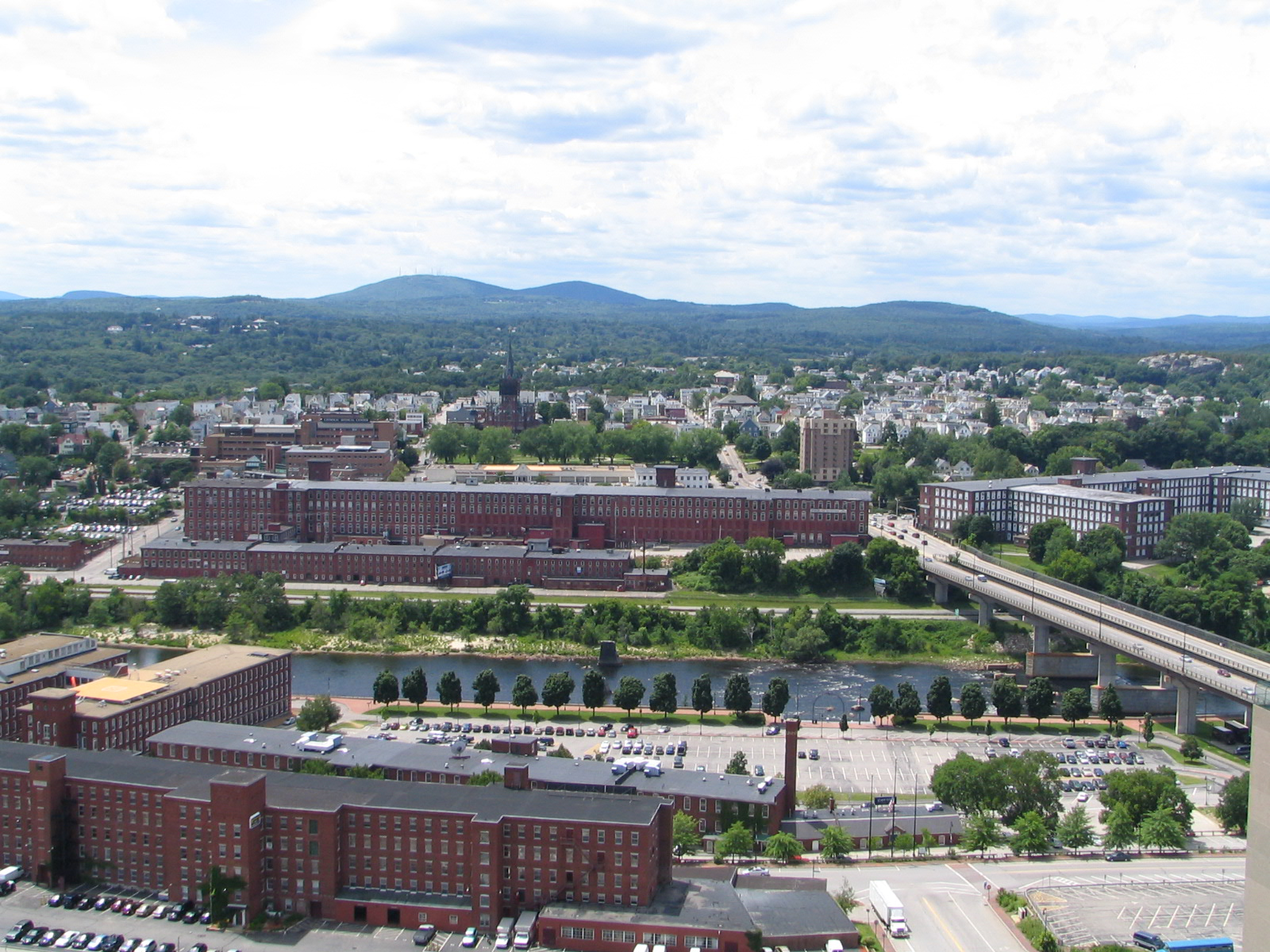
- The renovated space of Amoskeag Mills, c. 2006
- Industry: Textile; Rail transport
- Predecessor: Amoskeag Cotton & Woolen Manufacturing Company
- Founded: 1810; 216 years ago
- Founder: Benjamin Prichard
- Defunct: 1935; 91 years ago
- Fate: Declared bankruptcy
- Successor: Amoskeag Company
- Headquarters: Manchester, New Hampshire, United States
- Products: Denim, locomotives
- Number of employees: 17,000
- Divisions: Amoskeag Locomotive Works

The Amoskeag Manufacturing Company was a textile industry manufacturer which founded in Manchester, New Hampshire, United States. From modest beginnings it grew throughout the 19th century into the largest cotton textile plant in the world. At its peak, Amoskeag had 17,000 employees and around 30 buildings.

In the early 20th century, economic and social conditions changed as the New England textile industry shifted down to the Southern U.S., and the business went bankrupt in 1935. Many decades later, the original mills were refurbished and renovated, and now house offices, restaurants, software companies, college branches, art studios, apartments, and a museum.

The Amoskeag millyard complex was considered "one of the most remarkable manifestations of our urban and industrial culture by New York Times architecture critic Ada Louise Huxtable in her December 22, 1968 article Manchester, NH: Lessons in Urbicide. "The excellence of the complex has made it an acknowledged monument of American industrial history and urban design."

== History ==
=== Origins ===
In May 1807, Samuel Blodgett completed a canal and lock system beside the Merrimack River at Derryfield. His enterprise allowed boats traveling between Concord and Nashua to bypass Amoskeag Falls, opening the region to development and connecting it to a network linking it to Boston. Blodget envisioned a "Manchester of America" arising, a water-powered textile center comparable to Manchester, England, which he had recently visited, then at the forefront of the Industrial Revolution. At his apparent suggestion the name Derryfield was changed to Manchester in 1810. That same year, Benjamin Prichard and others incorporated the Amoskeag Cotton & Woolen Manufacturing Company. He and three brothers—Ephraim, David and Robert Stevens—had purchased land and water power rights the year before on the west bank of the Merrimack near Amoskeag Bridge, where they built a mill. From Samuel Slater they bought second-hand mill machinery, but it didn't work well. In 1811, new machinery was built to spin cotton into yarn, the currency with which factory wages and dividends were paid. Weaving became a cottage industry for local women, who earned between 2 and 7 cents per yard, depending on the type of fabric. A good weaver could average 10 to 12 yards (11 m) per day.

But the mill was unprofitable. Indeed, after September 1815, "little or nothing was done in it." In 1822, Olney Robinson of Rhode Island purchased the company, using money and equipment borrowed from Samuel Slater and Larned Pitcher. Robinson proved incompetent, however, and the business passed to his creditors. Slater and Pitcher then sold three-fifths of the company in 1825 to Dr. Oliver Dean, Lyman Tiffany and Willard Sayles of Massachusetts. In April 1826, Dr. Dean moved to the site and oversaw construction of the new Bell Mill, which was named for the bell on its roof to summon workers. Also erected was the Island Mill, located on an island in the Merrimack. Boarding houses and stores were built, creating the factory village of Amoskeag. The three-mill complex prospered, becoming known for its excellent "sheetings, shirtings and tickings," especially the latter. Success attracted investors. With capital of 1 million dollars, the business was incorporated on July 1, 1831, as the Amoskeag Manufacturing Company. Offices were established in Boston, where the treasurer de facto ran the firm, with an agent (manager) in Manchester to oversee personnel and operation of the mills.

=== Founding of Manchester, New Hampshire ===
Engineers determined that the east bank of the Merrimack River was best for the extensive mills, tiered canals and mill town the company planned. Consequently, most of the land on the east side was purchased in 1835, where property holdings would eventually encompass 15,000 acres (61 km^{2}). It would also purchase all nearby water power rights to prevent competition. A foundry and machine shop were established to make and maintain mill machinery. In 1838, Manchester was laid out and founded. In 1839, Stark Mill No. 1, an Amoskeag affiliate with 8,000 spindles, was completed, together with six blocks of boarding houses for employees. Throughout the company's history, its engineering department designed and built all mill facilities, whether for use by Amoskeag or others, giving the complex a unity of design. It had unity of color as well, the warm red brick made at the firm's brickyard upriver in Hooksett. Towers containing bells and stairwells added decorative flourishes to utilitarian factories. To take advantage of natural light, workshops were long but narrow, pierced with rows of windows. The Concord Railroad (later Boston & Maine Railroad) entered Manchester in 1842. Freight cars ran on spurs beside the mills to supply raw materials, particularly cotton from southern states, then carried away finished fabrics to markets around the country. One customer would be Levi Strauss, whose riveted blue jeans were made with cloth from the Amoskeag Mills.

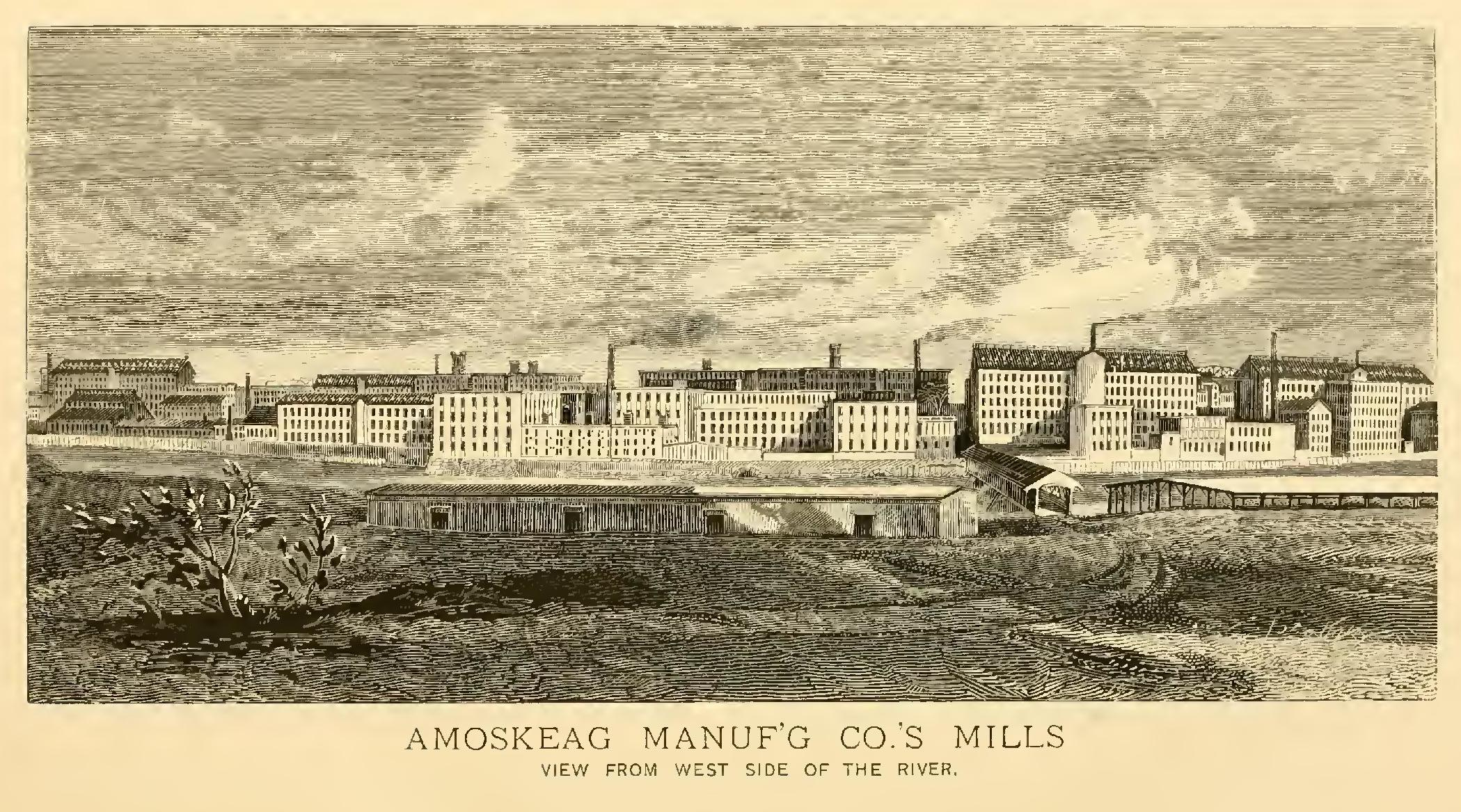
Amoskeag Manufacturing Co.'s Mills, c. 1875

Incorporated in 1846, Manchester was intended to be a model of utopian factory-city planning, as Lowell, Massachusetts - thirty miles down-river - had been. William Amory, the cultured company treasurer, together with Ezekiel A. Straw, the first Amoskeag agent, influenced the style of Manchester's urban design. It had broad avenues and squares ("reserved for public promenades") graced by fine schools, churches, hospitals, fire stations and a library. Row houses (called corporations) were built and rented to workers with families after years on a waiting list. Italianate, Second Empire and Queen Anne style mansions accommodated the company elite. Parks provided employees with fresh air, recreation and rest. Twenty acres were donated by Amoskeag Mills to create Valley Cemetery. The city's main thoroughfare, Elm Street, ran atop a ridge parallel to the mills below, but at a remove to lessen their clamor. Bostonian T. Jefferson Coolidge was the financial manager 1876 to 1898 who made it highly profitable.

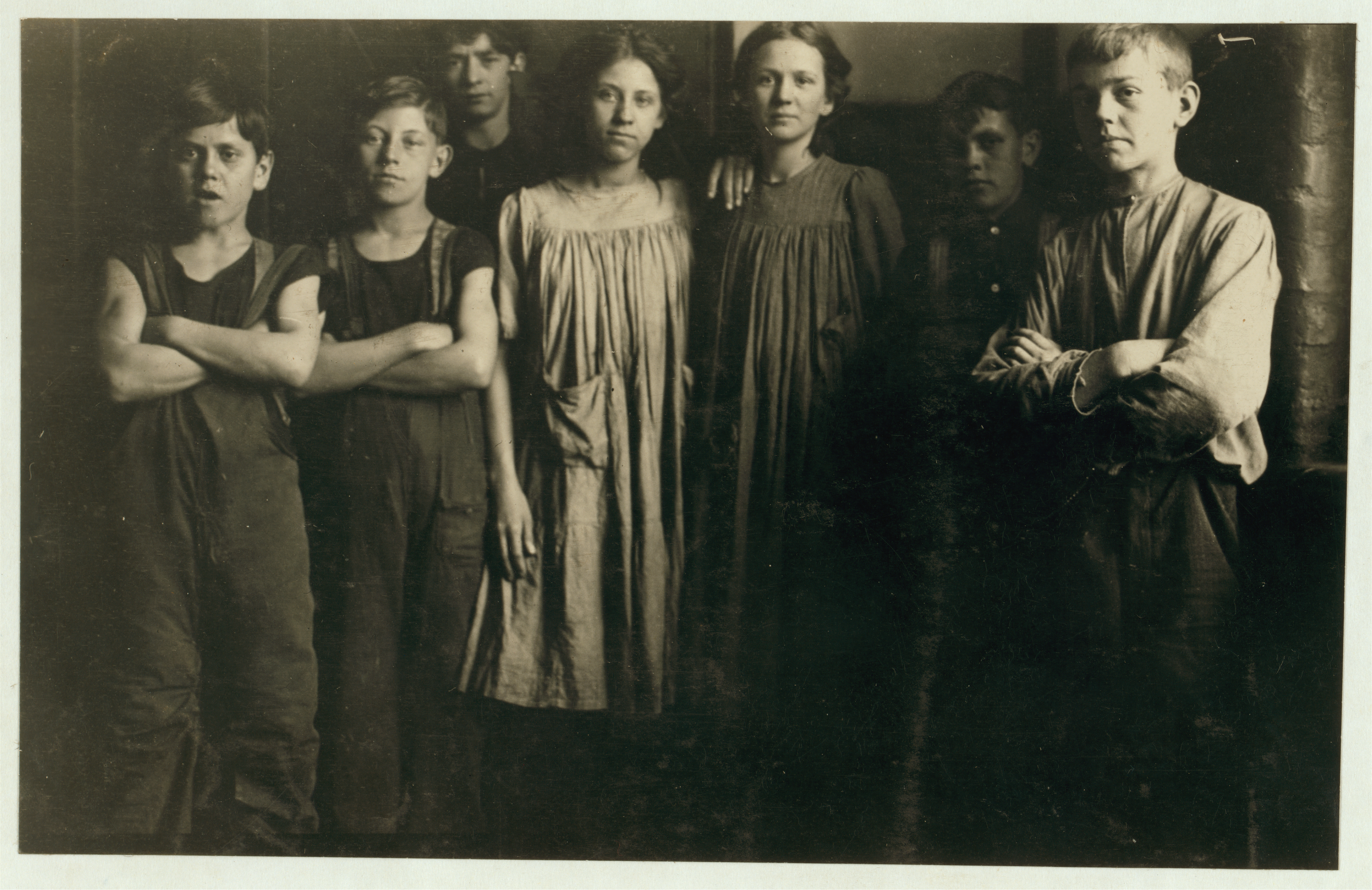
Caption on back reads: "A few of the small girls and boys (not the smallest ones) that I found working in the spinning room of one of the Amoskeag Mfg. Co. mill..." -1909

Everything in the company town seemed influenced by the benevolent paternalistic management—including the moral and physical habits of the help. Women in particular were monitored both at work and home in accordance with the Lowell System. At first many came to Manchester from surrounding farms. But as the need for labor increased, immigration was promoted from Canada, particularly Quebec. Other workers arrived from Greece, Germany, Sweden and Poland, with each nationality claiming a neighborhood in the city. The company, worried about labor movements within the company in the wake of the 1912 Bread and Roses Strike in Lawrence, Massachusetts, attempted to prevent unionizing activities and promoted the "Americanization" of the workforce through benevolence activities and the construction of Textile Field (now Gill Stadium) in 1913. When tower bells rang at the end of the day's one shift, thousands of employees changed from work clothes and swarmed out the iron gates.

Locomotives and fire engines were built by the Amoskeag Locomotive Works. During the Civil War, Southern cotton became scarce, so the company's foundry made over 27,000 muskets and 6,892 Lindner carbines, and relied on the Lamson, Goodnow & Yale company for their gun-making machinery. It would also make sewing machines and, of course, textile machinery. Following the rebellion, the country's rapid industrialization resumed, with Manchester becoming a textile center greater than its namesake. Company engineers built more factories, lining both sides of the Merrimack. Mill No. 11 was the world's largest cotton mill, 900 feet (270 m) long, 103 feet (31 m) wide, and containing 4000 looms. Gingham, flannel, and ticking were company specialties, although numerous other fabrics in cotton and wool were produced. The noise from thousands of looms running simultaneously in the weave rooms was deafening, so workers had to communicate by shouting in each other's ears or lip reading. Amoskeag peaked by World War I, supplying the federal government with military-related materiel. It employed up to 17,000 workers in 74 textile departments, with 30 mills weaving 50 miles (80 km) of cloth per hour. Defense patronage brought workers an increase in pay combined with a reduction in hours, from 54 to 48 per week.

=== The company in 1911 ===
(Data recorded on panoramic postcard reproduced above)

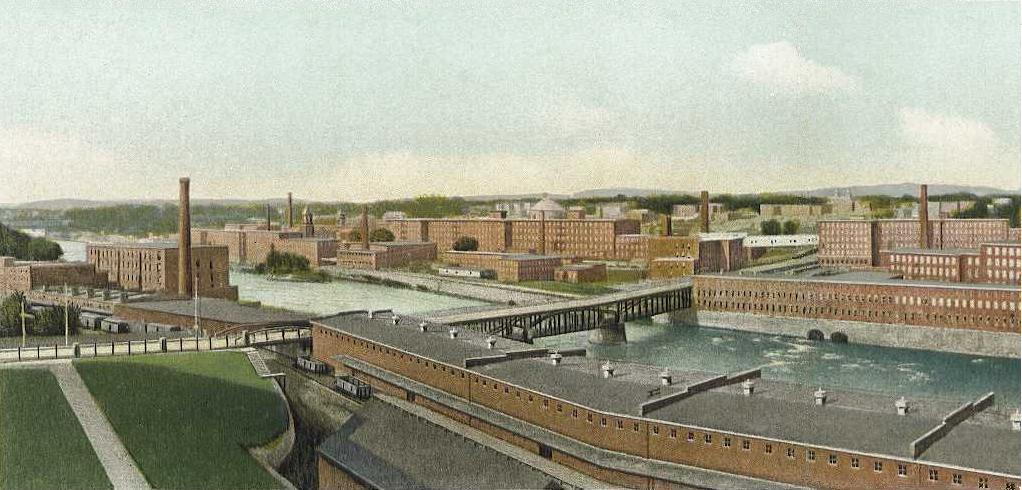
Amoskeag Manufacturing Company, looking upriver (north) in 1911

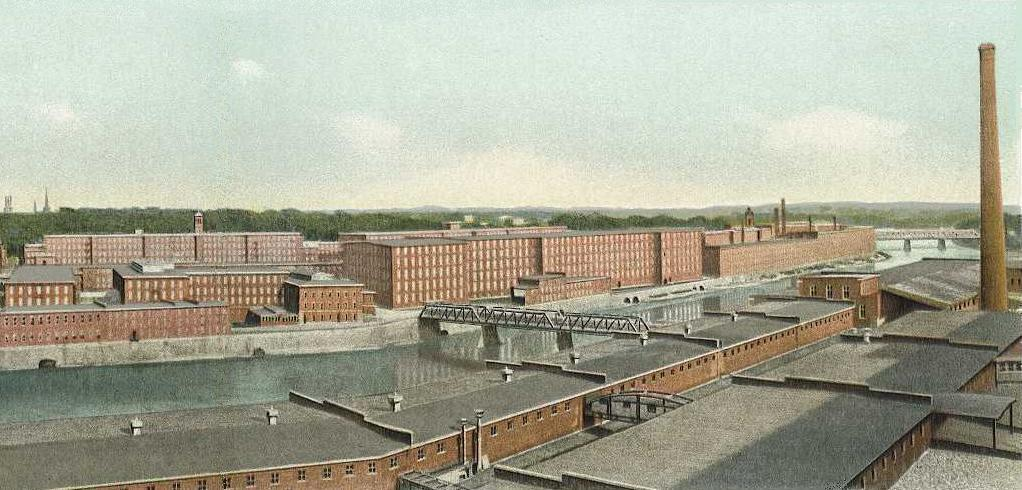
Amoskeag Manufacturing Company, looking downriver (south) in 1911

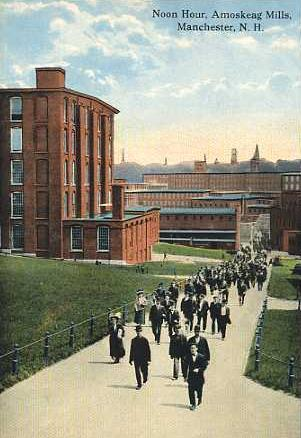
Noon Hour c. 1912

Statistics:

- Number of looms – 24,200
- Number of spindles – 662,000
- Length of cotton & worsted cloth woven per annum – 237,000,000 yards (217,000,000 m)
- Number of bags woven per annum – 1,500,000
- Number of turbine water wheels – 30
- Power furnished by wheels – 16,290 hp (12,147 kW)
- Number of boilers – 185
- Rated horsepower of boilers – 27,750
- Number of steam engines – 12
- Power furnished by engines – 15,100 hp (11,260 kW)
- Number of steam turbines – 5
- Power furnished by turbines – 26,678 hp (19,894 kW)
- Number of alternating current generators – 14
- Power developed by generators – 41,175 hp (30,704 kW)
- Number of electric motors – 583
- Power of motors – 27,702 hp (20,657 kW)
- Oil consumed per annum – 75,000 US gal

Size:

- Floor space in buildings – 5,844,340 sq ft (542,957 m^{2})
- Floor space in buildings – 137 acres (0.6 km^{2})

Wages:

(Table showing amount of wages paid per year at end of 10 year periods)

- 1831 – $36,298
- 1840 – $74,239
- 1850 – $487,005
- 1860 – $633,680
- 1870 – $1,107,428
- 1880 – $1,604,322
- 1890 – $2,435,481
- 1900 – $2,772,611
- 1910 – $6,176,353
- 1911 – $6,370,089

=== Decline ===
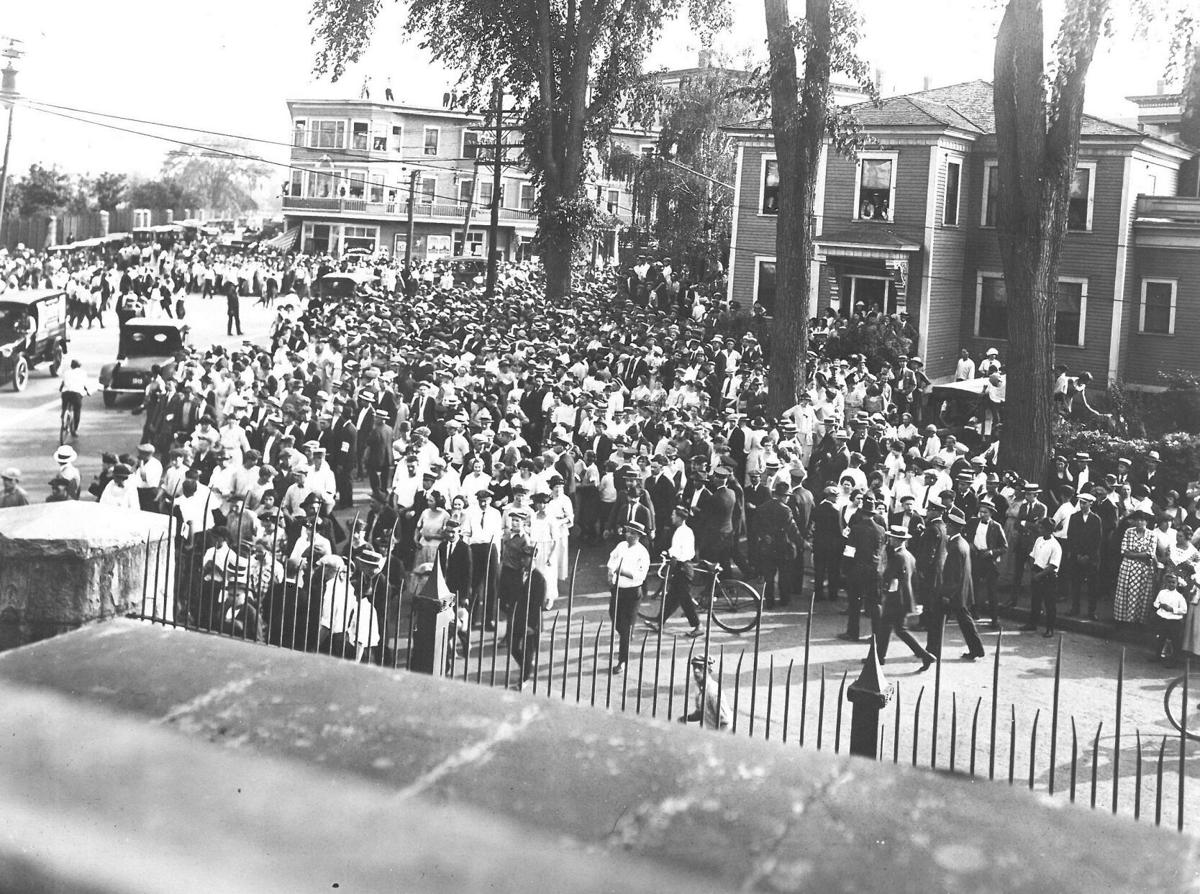
A large crowd gathers in Jutras Square jeering at company operatives as they attempt to leave Amoskeag’s Coolidge Mill during the strike. - June 7, 1922

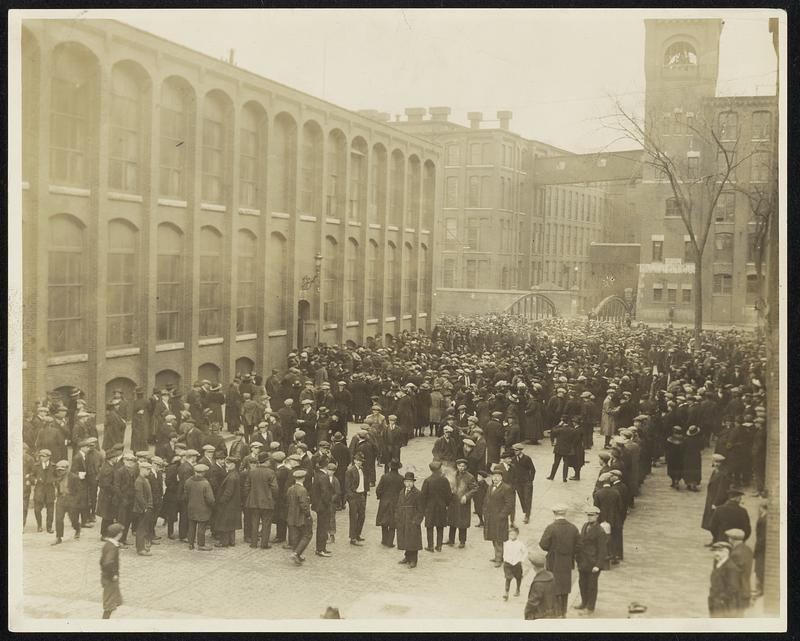
The dispute was a part of a larger strike, the 1922 New England Textile Strike. Shown here, strikers outside of a textile mill in Lawrence, Massachusetts.

Following the armistice ending World War I in 1918 the national economy slipped into recession. In the early 1920s, orders for Amoskeag products slackened, and various mills stopped production for days, weeks or even months. Without steady work or pay, the employees' bond with their once paternalistic employer weakened. That bond had kept Manchester a "strike-free" city.

Then Parker Straw, agent and grandson of Ezekiel A. Straw, posted a notice that as of February 13, 1922, all departments would receive a pay reduction of 20 percent, with running hours increased from 48 to 54 hours per week. This was alongside similar notices by most other major textile mills across New England.

The United Textile Workers of America persuaded millworkers to strike when the new arrangements were to take effect. They did, and the city's entire economy suffered. After Amoskeag restored the pre-strike wage scale in August, workers continued to strike for a return to the 48-hour week, as well as assurances that strike leaders would not be blacklisted. After nine months, however, necessity forced employees to return to work with their demands partially unmet, though they returned with the promise that the state House of Representatives—controlled by Democrats for the first time since 1914—would consider enacting a 48-hour law. The Republican-controlled Senate defeated the bill, however. Technically, Amoskeag won, but it would prove a pyrrhic victory.

The strike cost Amoskeag not only the loyalty of employees, but customers as well. And it occurred when new sources of energy, including electricity and petroleum, were replacing water power. Cotton could be processed and woven where it grew, saving transportation costs to New England. With aging technology, it became increasingly difficult for Amoskeag to compete. Northern labor costs were higher than in the South, which had new factories, layouts, and automatic looms. The South did not have New Hampshire's inventory tax, which levied commodity supplies at a business like coal and cotton. In an attempt to remain competitive, Amoskeag made the mistake of adding more mills and spindles to reduce the costs of making fabric, at a time when the textile industry had excess productive capacity.

=== Creation of a holding company ===
In 1925, treasurer Frederic C. Dumaine made the decision to split the firm in two, diverting accumulated profits from the Amoskeag Manufacturing Company's years of plenty into a newly created holding company, the Amoskeag Company. Capital was thereby protected for owners of the holding company, at the expense of denying it to the mills to modernize and survive fluctuations in the business cycle. When the Great Depression shortly followed, one daily shift was increased to three, with management again trying to increase hours and reduce pay—particularly for women, the majority of its workforce. Violent strikes in 1933 and 1934 required the intervention of the New Hampshire State Militia. When the picketing ended and work resumed, vengeful agitators sabotaged machines and products. The stricken business closed mill buildings one by one, laying off scores of employees when few jobs existed.

=== Bankruptcy ===
On Christmas Eve, 1935, the Amoskeag Manufacturing Company abruptly closed its doors and filed for bankruptcy. A damaging flood the following year ended any chance of revival. Per order of the presiding judge, the vast complex was liquidated. By 1937, half the buildings were occupied by other businesses under the aegis of Amoskeag Industries, established in 1936 by local businessmen.

== Revitalization of mill space ==
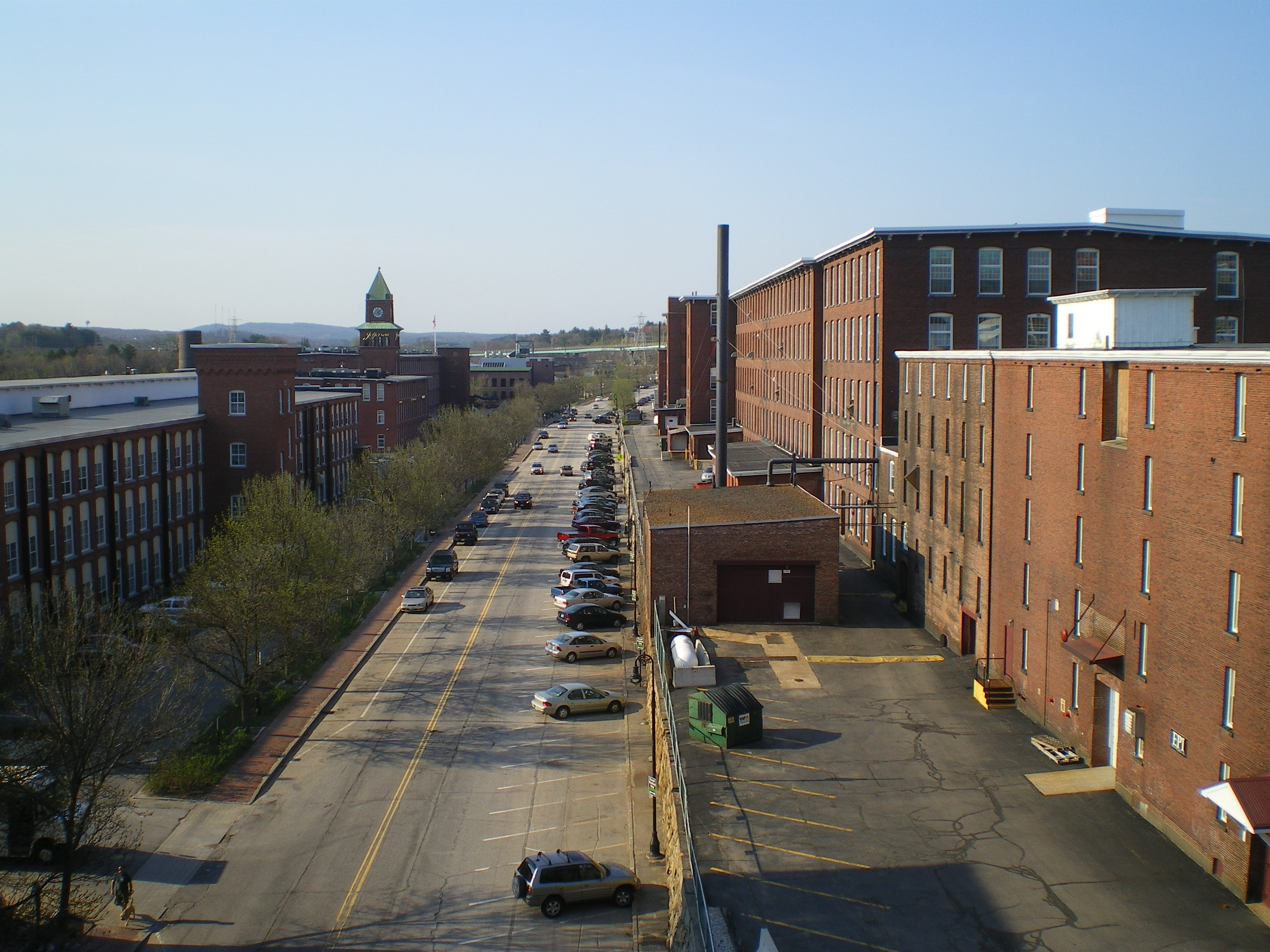
Amoskeag Manufacturing Company buildings, facing north in 2010

Entrepreneur Dean Kamen (who had begun buying and refurbishing mill buildings in the 1980s) led the work of the Amoskeag mills to build offices, restaurants, software companies, branches of local colleges, art studios and the Millyard Museum.

The SEE Science Center houses a large permanent minifigure-scale Lego recreation of the Millyard, with approximately 8,000 minifigures and an estimated five million bricks. It was built in phases between October 2004 and November 2006. The Manchester Historic Association gave research materials and awarded the center with a Historic Preservation Award for the project in 2006.

== See also ==
- National Register of Historic Places listings in Hillsborough County, New Hampshire
- Charles H. Manning (engineer)
- Parkhill Mill
- New Hampshire Historical Marker No. 124: Amoskeag Mills
- Amoskeag Company
- Head v. Amoskeag Manufacturing Co.
- Eunice Connolly

== Bibliography ==
- George Waldo Browne, The Amoskeag Manufacturing Co. of Manchester, New Hampshire: A History, The Amoskeag Manufacturing Company, Manchester, NH, 1915 online
- Daniel Creamer and Charles Coulter, Labor and the Shutdown of the Amoskeag Textile Mills, Works Projects Administration, Philadelphia, PA, 1939
- Aurore Eaton, The Amoskeag Manufacturing Company: A History of Enterprise on the Merrimack River,The History Press, Charleston, SC, 2015
- Tamara K. Hareven, Amoskeag: Life and Work in an American Factory-City, University Press of New England, Hanover, NH 1978 online
- Arthur M. Kenison, Dumaine's Amoskeag: Let the Record Speak, St. Anselm College Press, Goffstown, NH, 1997 online
- Robert Macieski, Picturing Class: Lewis W. Hine Photographs Child Labor in New England, University of Massachusetts Press, Amherst, MA, 2015
- Robert B. Perreault, Franco-American Life & Culture in Manchester, New Hampshire: Vivre la Différence, The History Press, Charleston, SC, 2010
- Scott C. Roper and Stephanie Abbot Roper, When Baseball Met Big Bill Haywood: The Battle for Manchester, New Hampshire, 1912–1916, McFarland and Company, Inc., Publishers, Jefferson, NC, 2018
- Gary Samson, Manchester: The Mills and the Immigrant Experience, Arcadia Press, Charleston, SC, 2000.
- Alan R. Sweezy, "The Amoskeag Manufacturing Company," Quarterly Journal of Economics; Vol. 52, No. 3 (May, 1938)
