= Charles H. Manning (engineer) =

American naval officer and engineer (1844–1919)

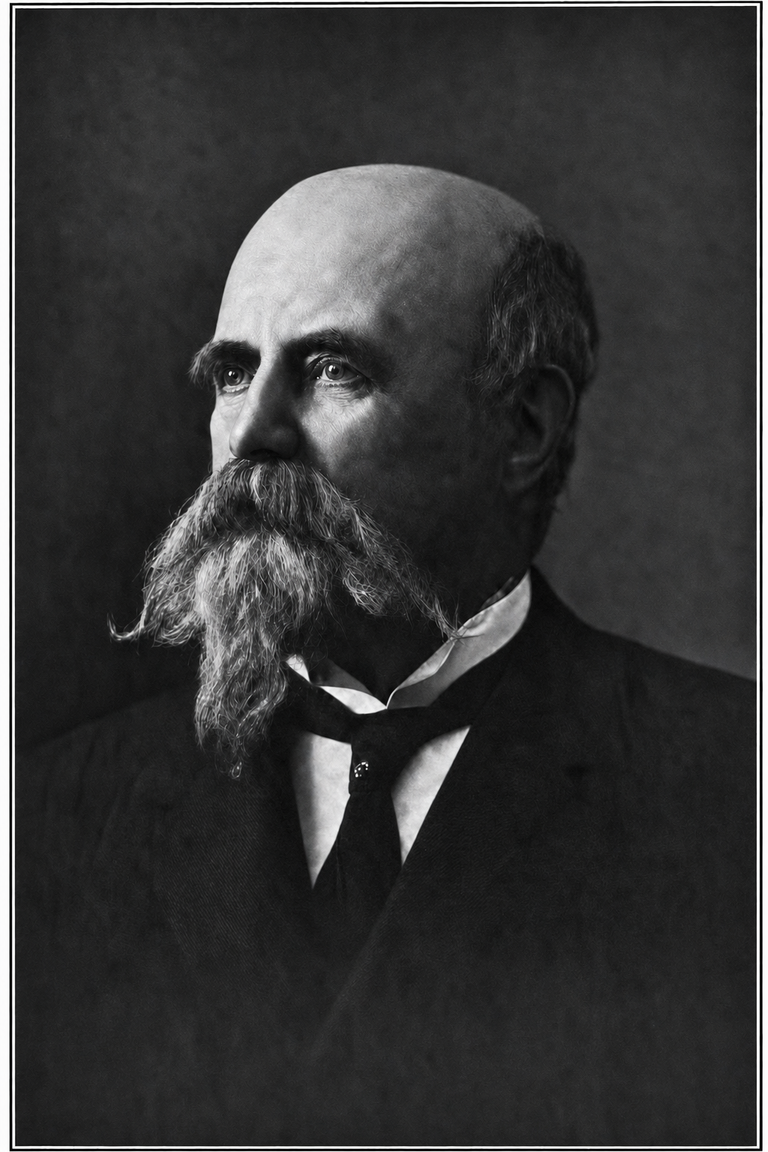
- Born: June 9, 1844; Baltimore, Maryland
- Died: April 1, 1919 (aged 74); Manchester, New Hampshire
- Burial place: Pine Grove Cemetery, Manchester, New Hampshire
- Education: Bachelor of Science, Lawrence Scientific School of Harvard University, 1862
- Occupation: Power-plant engineer
- Employer(s): US Navy, Amoskeag Manufacturing Company
- Known for: Manning boiler
- Title: Chief Engineer, US Navy (retired)
- Board member of: Board of Water Commissioners, Manchester NH
- Spouse: Fanny Bartlett (m. 1871)
- Awards: Honorary Member, ASME (1913)

Charles Henry Manning (June 9, 1844 – April 1, 1919) was an American naval officer and power-plant engineer. He helped develop a curriculum for cadet engineers at the US Naval Academy; he was the chief engineer of Amoskeag Manufacturing Company (one of the largest cotton mills of the era) and consulted for other large mills; and he designed the Manning boiler. After a large cast-iron mill flywheel burst in 1891, Manning designed a wooden replacement, reportedly the largest of its kind in the world. Manning was an honorary member of the American Society of Mechanical Engineers.

== Childhood and education ==
Manning was born in Baltimore, Maryland, on June 9, 1844. He had his early education in Baltimore and later Cambridge, Massachusetts. He received a Bachelor of Science degree from the Lawrence Scientific School of Harvard University in 1862.

== US Navy career ==
In February 1863, Manning became a third assistant engineer in the US Navy. He was soon appointed by chief engineer Benjamin Isherwood to conduct experiments on superheating steam on the USS Adelaide. After two years on the Adelaide, he joined the USS Dacotah. In July 1866, he was promoted to second assistant engineer.

In 1870, he was assigned as an instructor at the US Naval Academy, a post that he held for five years. During this time, he helped to organize a course of instruction for cadet engineers. He became first assistant engineer in October 1872. Manning also served on the first advisory board to develop specifications for a "new Navy". The other board members were Rear Admiral John Rodgers and Chief Engineers Isherwood and Charles H. Loring.

Manning retired from active duty in the US Navy in 1882 and was formally placed on the Navy's retired list on June 4, 1884. He was called back to service during the Spanish–American War, to serve as chief engineer overseeing the repair of warships at the Key West Naval Station in Florida.

Manning was commissioned chief engineer on the retired list in February 1911. (Note: The rank of chief engineer carried relative rank equivalent to captain, and Manning is styled "Captain" in some sources.)

== Career as a power-plant engineer for textile mills ==
In 1883, Manning joined the Amoskeag Manufacturing Company in Manchester, New Hampshire, as chief engineer. Amoskeag was among the world's largest cotton mills. Manning supervised all of the company's power plants. During his time, power use expanded from 800 long tons (810 t) of fuel per week to 3,000 long tons (3,000 t) tons per week. Manning also consulted for other large mills.

Manning was associated with many original power-plant designs. These included the Manning boiler and a 200-horsepower (150 kW)-horsepower horizontal water turbine in 1885, the largest of its kind at that time.

On October 15, 1891, a 2,000-horsepower (1,500 kW) Corliss engine's 30-foot (9.1 m) diameter cast-iron flywheel burst, destroying the building that housed the engine. In the aftermath of this disaster, Manning designed a new 30-foot (9.1 m) diameter flywheel to replace it. He made the new flywheel from western ash, measuring 9 feet 0.25 inches (2.7496 m) on the face and 12 inches (30 cm) in thickness. The flywheel was composed of 44 rings of ash, secured by 16 lag bolts per section and some 18,000 lag screws. The flywheel was reportedly the largest wooden wheel in the world at the time.

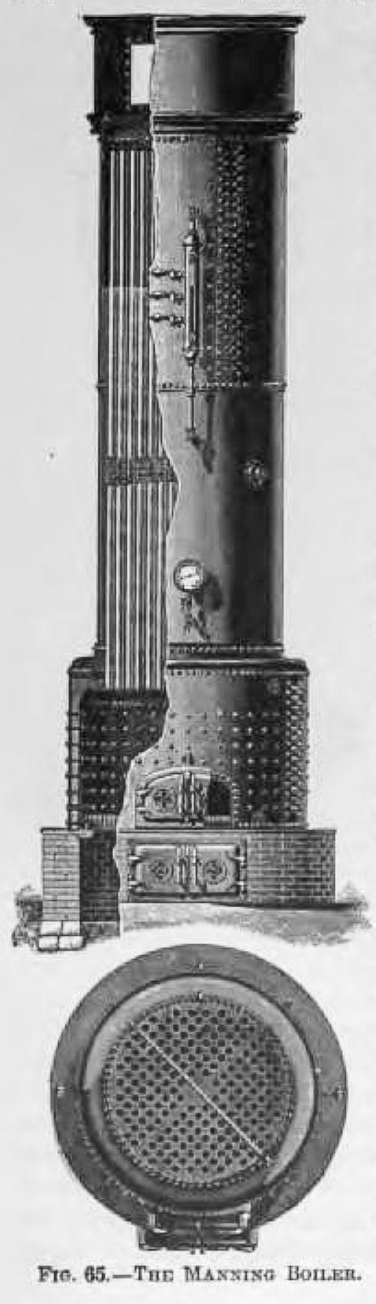
Manning boiler

Manning retired from Amoskeag in 1913. In the same year, Manning was elected an honorary member of the American Society of Mechanical Engineers.

== Manning boiler ==
Manning designed the "Manning boiler", for which he received a US patent in 1885. It is a vertical fire-tube boiler suitable for use where floor space is limited and large power is required. The distinguishing characteristic of the Manning boiler was that it included several design features to facilitate cleaning and removal of sediment. The design also uses a double-flanged head to allow for expansion of the tubes and shell. The Manning boiler produces especially dry steam because the water level is well below the tube sheet.

The US Navy employed Manning boilers in both New York Navy Yard and the Key West Naval Station. However, the main application of the boiler was in textile mills: the Manchester Historical Association states that the Amoskeag Manufacturing Company employed 197 Manning boilers.
