= Parkhill Mill =

- U.S. National Register of Historic Places
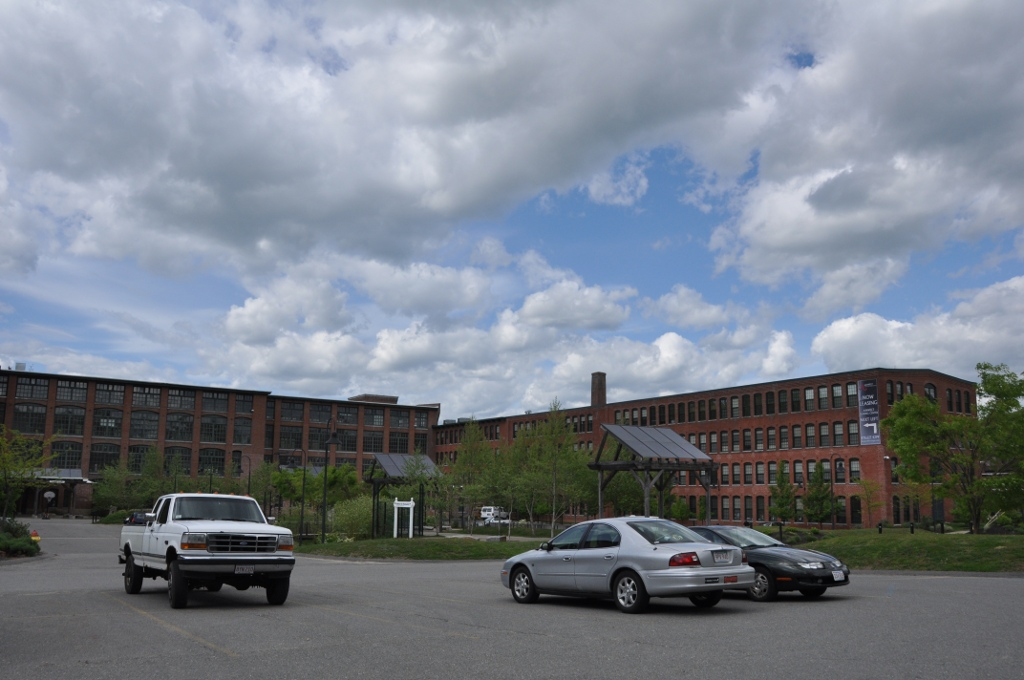

- Location within Massachusetts Location within the United States
- Location: 1 Oak Hill Rd., Fitchburg, Massachusetts
- Coordinates: 42°34′51″N 71°49′18″W
- Area: 5.3 acres (2.1 ha)
- Built: 1885
- NRHP reference No.: 08000090
- Added to NRHP: February 20, 2008

The Parkhill Mill is an historic mill complex at 1 Oak Hill Road in Fitchburg, Massachusetts. Built between 1885 and 1915, it was one of three mill complexes of the Parkill Company, one of the city's largest employers of the period. The mill complex was added to the National Register of Historic Places in 2008. The complex has been restored and is used by a variety of public and private businesses, and as residential space.

== Description and history ==
The Parkhill Mill complex is located west of downtown Fitchburg, on the south bank of the Nashua River east of Oak Hill Road and north of Cleghorn Street. The complex consists of four buildings, three of which are joined in a U shape open to the south; the fourth, the mill's former boiler house, is located just east of these three, oriented north–south and parallel to the eastern leg of the U. Other features of the complex include its original brick chimney stack, and a former railroad bridge spanning the Nashua River. The main mill buildings are four stories in height, and are built out of red brick. Windows are set in segmented-arch openings, and the roof is of low pitch, with a projecting eave adorned with exposed rafters.

The oldest portion of the complex, part of the U's base, was built in 1885 by Andrew Cleghorn, a Scottish immigrant who operated it as a textile mill. He sold the mill to John Parkhill, his brother-in-law, in 1889. Parkhill was also a Scottish immigrant who had worked for many years in the mills of Adams, Massachusetts. Parkhill had begun his business in a former chair factory in 1879, and expanded into a second complex in Fitchburg in 1887 before buying this one. The Parkhill Manufacturing Company principally produced gingham fabrics, and at its peak employed more than 1,000 people. This mill complex originally include two other buildings, which were located in the central space of the U, which is now occupied by a parking lot for the building tenants, clients and visitors.

== See also ==
- National Register of Historic Places listings in Worcester County, Massachusetts
- 1922 New England Textile Strike
