= Amoskeag Company =

- Industry: Textiles, Real Estate, Railroads
- Predecessor: Amoskeag Manufacturing Company
- Founded: 1925
- Defunct: 2003
- Fate: Chapter 11 bankruptcy
- Headquarters: 4500 Prudential Center, Boston, Massachusetts, USA
- Revenue: $1.25 billion (1992)
- Number of employees: 17,300 (1992)
- Subsidiaries: Pillowtex Corporation; Bangor and Aroostook Railroad; Logistics Management Systems, Inc.

The Amoskeag Company was a privately owned American holding and operating company. It was calved off from the Amoskeag Manufacturing Company (AMC) of New Hampshire in 1925, which went bankrupt a decade later. Through its subsidiary the Pillowtex Corporation it was the last owner of the Fieldcrest Mills in North Carolina. When AMC profits declined in the mid-1920s, the Amoskeag Company was created as a shelter in order to transfer all of the profits from the manufacturing company's booming years clear both of that firm's operational needs and possible business failure. When AMC declared bankruptcy in 1936 that money was untouchable, allowing the holding company to continue unaffected.

The company was reincorporated into a holding company in 1965 based out of Boston, MA. Amoskeag later merged with Fieldcrest Cannon in mid-1993, which was later purchased by Pillowtex. The Pillowtex Corporation filed a Chapter 11 bankruptcy petition in the United States Bankruptcy Court on July 20, 2003, bringing an end to the Amoskeag Company as a brand. A liquidating plan was confirmed, which created the Pillowtex Liquidating Trust. Oak Point Partners acquired the remnant assets of the Pillowtex Liquidating Trust in February 2012.
