= Benjamin Prichard =

American industrialist

Benjamin Prichard was an early American industrialist who founded the Amoskeag Cotton and Wool Manufacturing Company, which would grow to be the largest cotton textile mill in the world.
