= Amoskeag Falls =

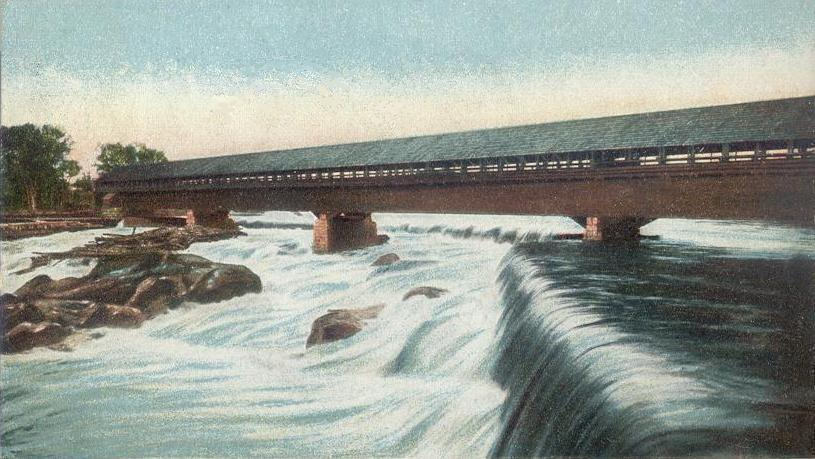
- Location: Manchester, New Hampshire, United States
- Coordinates: 43°00′08″N 71°28′22″W

The Amoskeag Falls are a set of waterfalls on the Merrimack River in Manchester, New Hampshire, United States.

== History ==
"Amoskeag" derives from the Pennacook Native American word "Namoskeag", which roughly translates as "good fishing place". Here, the Merrimack River drops 50 feet (15 m) over the course of 0.25 miles (0.40 km). Local tribes in the region fished Amoskeag Falls for its plentiful migrating sturgeon, alewife, and salmon, which were easily caught in the rapids. Natives typically used a combination of large nets strung across the river. Significant native settlements were sited near the falls, particularly on the high bluffs overlooking the east side of the river. 'Amuskeage' was listed as a 'noted habitation' for native people in New England in 1634.

In 1807, Samuel Blodgett started a canal and lock system at the river to help vessels navigate around the falls, opening the area to development. This soon led to the use of the falls for a power canal to provide water power for Manchester's 19th century industrial development, most notable for the Amoskeag Manufacturing Company.

== Use of the name ==
Due to the significance of the falls in Manchester history, a number of local companies have adopted their name. Examples include the Amoskeag Manufacturing Company (which operated a majority of Manchester's textile mills using power from the falls until they closed in the midst of labor strikes in 1935), its division called the Amoskeag Locomotive Works (an early manufacturer of fire trucks and train cars), and the Amoskeag Fishways (an environmental education center located at the Amoskeag Falls power dam and operated by Eversource Energy).

== See also ==
- List of waterfalls
