= Amoskeag Locomotive Works =

Steam locomotive builder of Manchester, New Hampshire

- Industry: Steam locomotives
- Founded: 1848; 177 years ago
- Defunct: 1876
- Headquarters: Manchester, New Hampshire, United States
- Parent: Amoskeag Manufacturing Company

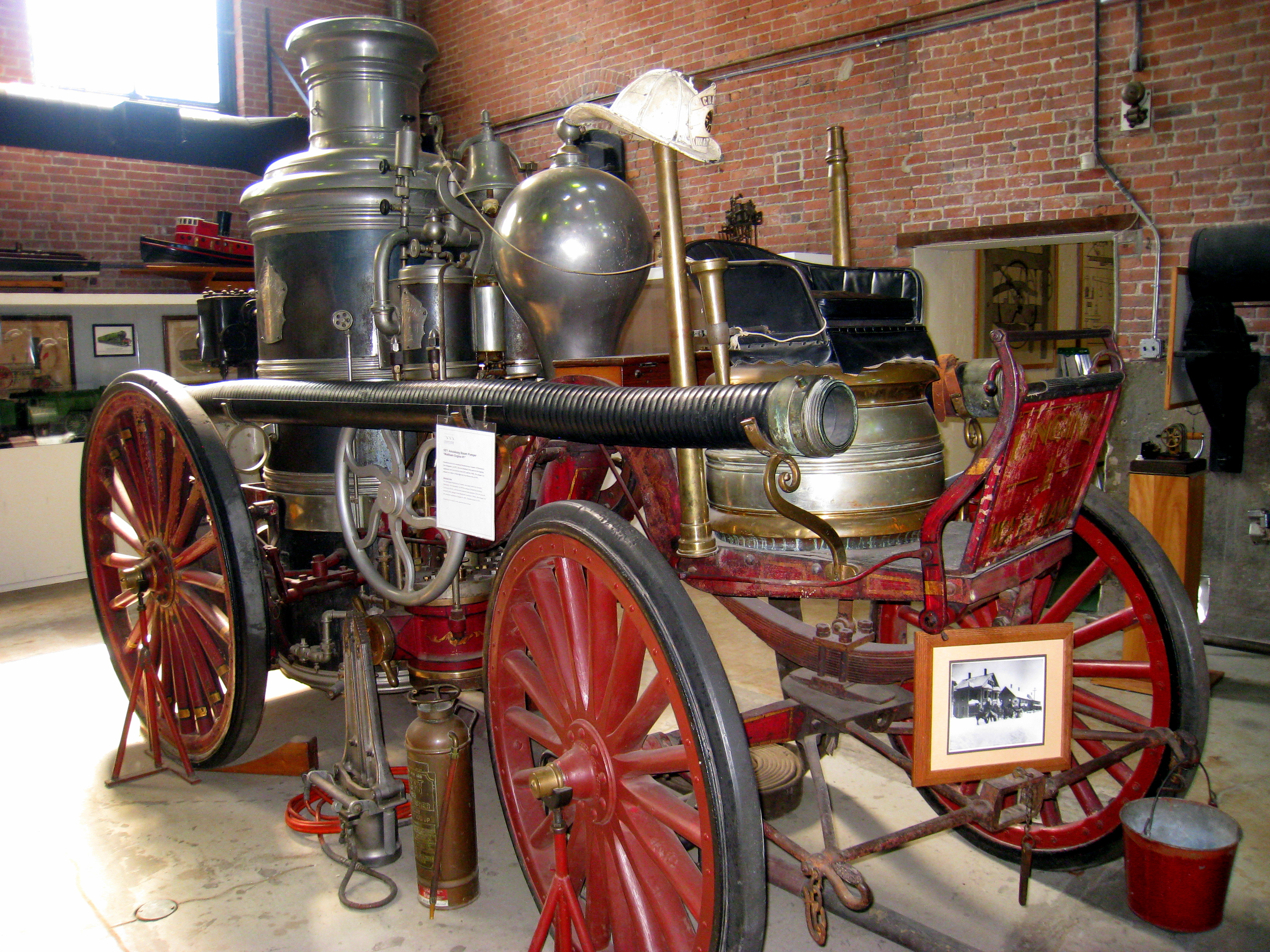
1871 Amoskeag horse-drawn, steam-powered fire engine

The Amoskeag Locomotive Works, in Manchester, New Hampshire, built steam locomotives at the dawn of the railroad era in the United States. The locomotive works operated as a division of the Amoskeag Manufacturing Company between 1848 and 1859.

Besides building locomotives for railroad use, Amoskeag also built steam fire engines until 1876. A steam-driven self-propelled appliance was made by Amoskeag was used to fight the Great Boston Fire of 1872. Amoskeag fire engines served as the initial fleet for the New York City Fire Department and the first Los Angeles Fire Department fire company. The Firefighters Museum in Yarmouth, Nova Scotia, has an 1863 Amoskeag fire engine.

== Company history ==
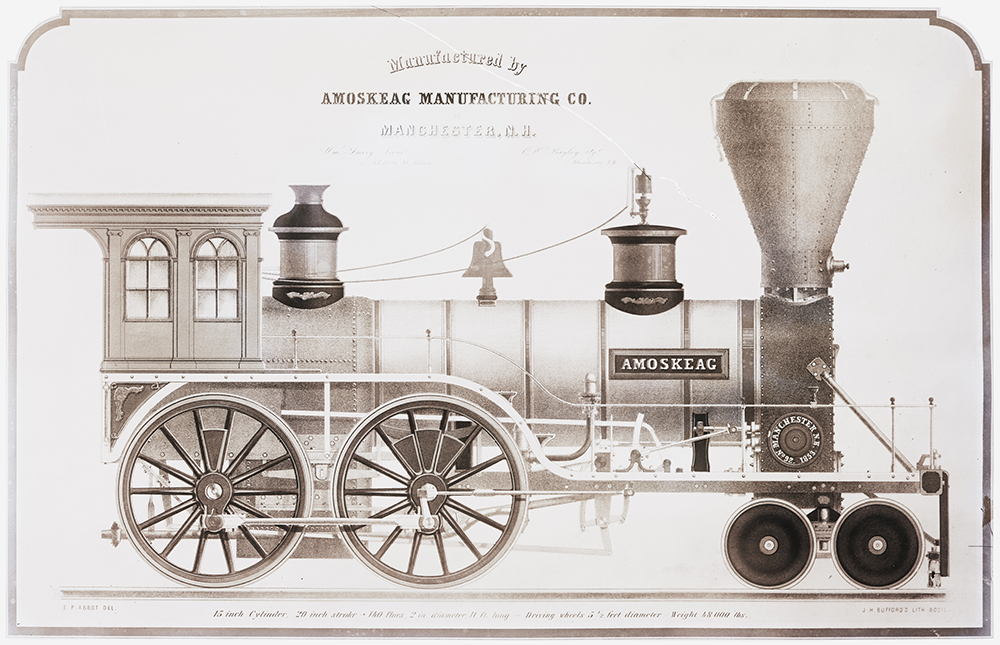
Amoskeag' locomotive, No. 92, shown in 1853

The locomotive manufacturing operations began within a new machine shop built for the Amoskeag Manufacturing Company. The shop opened in 1848, and the first locomotive was built there in 1849. In 1856 the shop built 60 locomotives.

In 1859 Amoskeag Manufacturing sold the locomotive business to Manchester Locomotive Works, of which Oliver W. Bayley and Aretas Blood were principals. Amoskeag Manufacturing sold the fire engine business to the Manchester Locomotive Works in 1876.
