= George H. Perkins =

United States Navy officer (1836–1899)

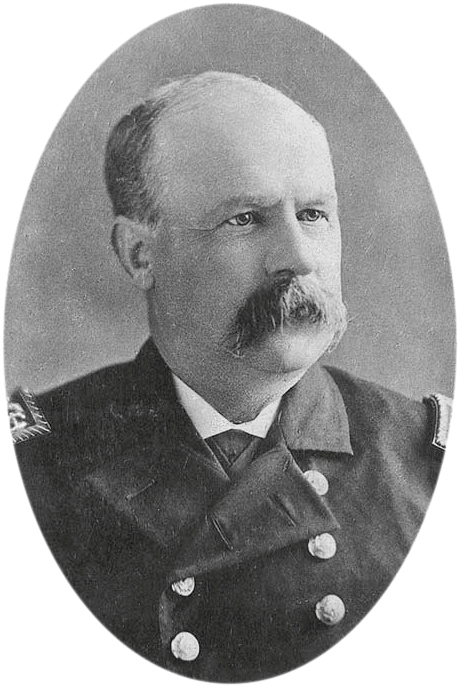
- Captain George H. Perkins, USN
- Born: George Hamilton Perkins; October 20, 1836; Contoocook, New Hampshire, U.S.
- Died: 28 October 1899 (aged 63); Boston, Massachusetts, U.S.

Commodore George Hamilton Perkins (October 20, 1836 – October 29, 1899) was an officer in the United States Navy during the American Civil War.

== Biography ==
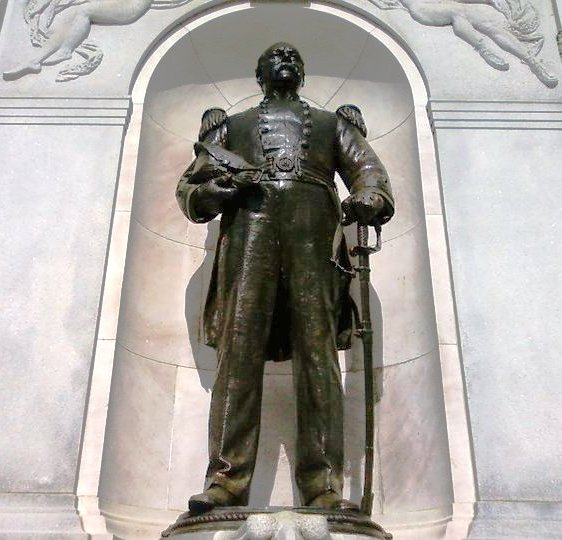
Statue of George H. Perkins, erected in 1902

Born in Contoocook, New Hampshire, in the northern part of Hopkinton to the Honorable Hamilton Eliot Perkins, George was appointed as acting midshipman in October 1851 and graduated from the U.S. Naval Academy with the class of 1856.

=== Early career ===
During the rest of that decade Midshipman Perkins served on at sea on the sloop of war Cyane, the storeship Release and the steamer Sumpter. He attained the ranks of master in 1859 and lieutenant in February 1861, on the eve of the Civil War. Perkins spent the conflict's first several months in the Sumpter, operating on anti-slavery patrols. In early 1862 he was assigned as executive officer to the West Gulf Blockading Squadron (WGBS) Unadilla-class gunboat USS Cayuga under its commanding officer Lieutenant N.B. (Napoleon Bonaparte) Harrison in which he performed distinguished service during the 1862 campaigns to capture New Orleans and the lower Mississippi River.

During Admiral Farragut's assault up-river towards New Orleans April 24–25, the Cayuga, with Lt. Perkins at the wheel through the storm of shot and shell, was the first warship to pass forts Jackson and St. Phillip. The Cayuga found itself alone north of the forts and being assailed by eleven Confederate vessels, including the sloop rigged steamer C.S.S. Governor Moore which the Cayuga sank, and the ram C.S.S. Manassas, whose attack narrowly missed the Cayuga's stern. Once the fleet lay at anchor in the river off New Orleans, Lieutenant Perkins accompanied Captain Theodorus Bailey, U.S.N., in the first boat sent ashore, to demand the surrender of the city (which was refused).

He was next executive officer of the steam sloop Pensacola, receiving promotion to lieutenant commander at the end of 1862. His service on the Mississippi and in the Gulf of Mexico continued in 1863–1865, including command of gunboats New London and Sciota, and the monitor Chickasaw. While in the latter ship, his aggressive and effective conduct during the August 1864 Battle of Mobile Bay was a major factor in the capture of the Confederate ironclad Tennessee.

=== Post-Civil War ===
In the years immediately following the Civil War, Lieutenant Commander Perkins was superintendent of iron-clads at New Orleans, executive officer of the steam sloop Lackawanna in the North Pacific, and had ordnance duty at the Boston Navy Yard. Reaching the rank of commander in early 1871, he spent the next decade as commanding officer of the storeship Relief and gunboat Ashuelot and had further shore duty at Boston.

Perkins was promoted to captain in 1882 and commanded the Pacific Station flagship USS Hartford during the mid-1880s. Captain Perkins' subsequent active service was limited to court-martial duty. He was transferred to the Retired List in October 1891, but in 1896 received a Congressionally authorized promotion to the retired rank of commodore in recognition of his gallantry and skill during the Battle of Mobile Bay three decades earlier. Commodore Perkins died at Boston on 28 October 1899.

Perkins was a First Class Companion of the Massachusetts Commandery of the Military Order of the Loyal Legion of the United States.

== Family ==
Perkins as a young midshipman during the 1850s

The commodore married a daughter of William Fletcher Weld, a multimillionaire from Boston's famous Weld Family.

Their daughter, Isabel Weld Perkins, married Larz Anderson, a wealthy businessman who served as Ambassador to Japan under William Howard Taft. Among the homes they maintained was Perkins Manor, the commodore's birthplace.

The Andersons' legacy to the public includes Anderson House, Anderson Memorial Bridge, Larz Anderson Auto Museum, Larz Anderson Bonsai Collection and Larz Anderson Park.

== Ships named after Perkins ==
The U.S. Navy has named three destroyers in honor of George H. Perkins, including:

- USS Perkins Destroyer # 26, later DD-26 of 1910–1935
- USS Perkins (DD-377) of 1936–1943
- USS Perkins (DD-877, later DDR-877 and DD-877) of 1945–1973.
