= LEMS =

LEMS may refer to:

- Landstuhl Elementary Middle School, an American international school in Germany
- Lambert–Eaton myasthenic syndrome, results in muscle weakness
- The Lems electric car manufactured by the London Electromobile Syndicate
