= Statue of George H. Perkins =

Statue in Concord, New Hampshire

Commodore George Hamilton Perkins
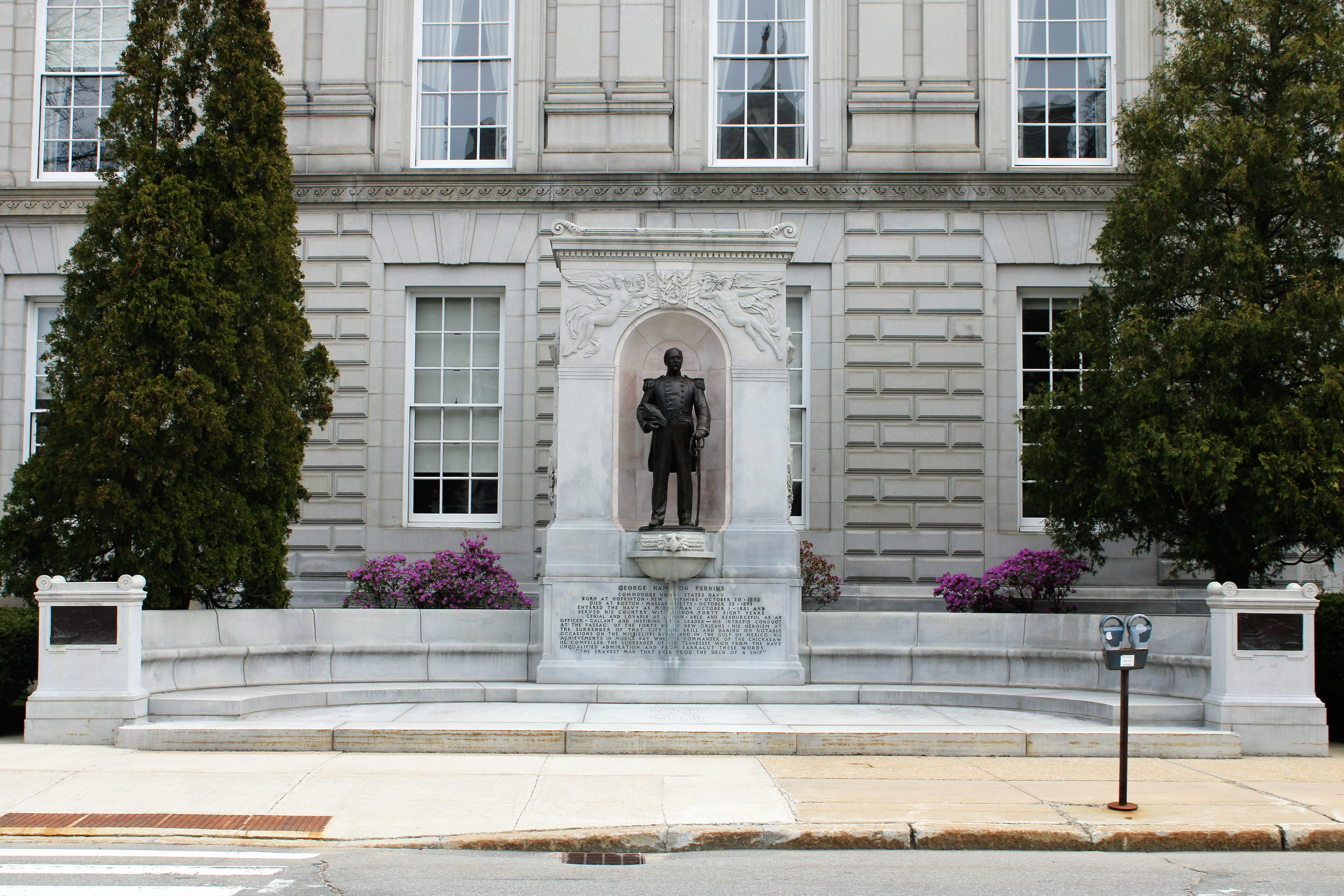
- The monument in 2022
- Interactive map of Commodore George Hamilton Perkins
- Location: New Hampshire State House, Concord, New Hampshire, United States
- Coordinates: 43°12′24.5″N 71°32′18.7″W
- Designer: Daniel Chester French (sculptor); Henry Bacon (architect)
- Fabricator: Henry Bonnard Bronze Company
- Material: Bronze (statue); Granite (structure); Tennessee marble (structure)
- Length: 26 inches (0.66 m) (statue); 42 feet (13 m) (memorial)
- Width: 35 inches (0.89 m) (statue); 20 feet (6.1 m) (memorial)
- Height: 7.5 feet (2.3 m) (statue); 20 feet (6.1 m) (memorial)
- Beginning date: 1899
- Completion date: 1902
- Dedicated date: April 25, 1902
- Dedicated to: George H. Perkins

Commodore George Hamilton Perkins is a public memorial that stands on the grounds of the New Hampshire State House in Concord, New Hampshire, United States. The statue was designed by sculptor Daniel Chester French, with architect Henry Bacon designing the remainder of the public monument. It honors George H. Perkins, a New Hampshire native who had served as an officer in the United States Navy during the American Civil War. The statue was dedicated in 1902.

== History ==
=== Background and creation ===
George H. Perkins was born in Hopkinton, New Hampshire in 1836. During the American Civil War, he served in the United States Navy as a naval officer. Serving under David Farragut, he was noted for his involvement in the Capture of New Orleans and the Battle of Mobile Bay, prompting Farragut to refer to Perkins as "the bravest man that ever trod the deck of a ship". He died on October 28, 1899.

On November 22 of that year, Isabel Weld Perkins (his daughter) offered New Hampshire Governor Frank W. Rollins, on behalf of the state, a statue of her father as the basis for a public memorial. The governor and Executive Council of New Hampshire voted to approve the donation and a portion of the grounds of the New Hampshire State House was set aside for a memorial to Perkins. Daniel Chester French, a New Hampshire native, was chosen to sculpt the statue, with Henry Bacon serving as the architect for the memorial. The bronze statue was cast by the Henry Bonnard Bronze Company.

=== Dedication ===
The dedication ceremony for the completed memorial was held on April 25, 1902. Three large seating platforms were arranged around the memorial to hold over a thousand spectators. Members of the Grand Army of the Republic were given their own stands, while another platform was reserved for members of Nevers' 2nd Regiment Band and a choir that included members of St. Paul's Episcopal Church and the Concord Oratorio Society, among others. In total, over 10,000 spectators partook in the dedication. Guests of honor at the ceremony included Commander William S. Cowles (as a representative for U.S. President Theodore Roosevelt), Rear Admiral John Grimes Walker (representing U.S. Secretary of the Navy John Davis Long), and several other politicians and military officials. These guests were received by Governor Chester B. Jordan, while former Governor Rollins served as the master of ceremonies.

The ceremony began with the choir singing "Our God, Our Help in Ages Past", followed by a prayer given by the Reverend Daniel C. Roberts of St. Paul's Episcopal Church. Following this, Isabel, escorted by her uncle, unveiled the statue, which was covered by an American flag. Following this, an 11-gun salute was given by a company of the New Hampshire National Guard and the band played "Under the Double Eagle". Rear Admiral George Belknap then presented the statue to the state and gave a speech on Perkins. The statue was accepted by Governor Jordan, who proceeded to give an address. After his speech, the band played "From All that Dwell Below the Skies" and President William Jewett Tucker of Dartmouth College gave another speech. After this, the band played "America" and "The Star-Spangled Banner" and Bishop William Woodruff Niles of the Episcopal Diocese of New Hampshire gave a benediction. As part of the closing of the ceremony, another 11-gun salute was performed.

=== Replica ===
On May 29, 1911, a replica of the statue of Perkins was unveiled at the United States Naval Academy. It is located in Bancroft Hall on a balcony that overlooks the Chesapeake Bay.

== Design ==
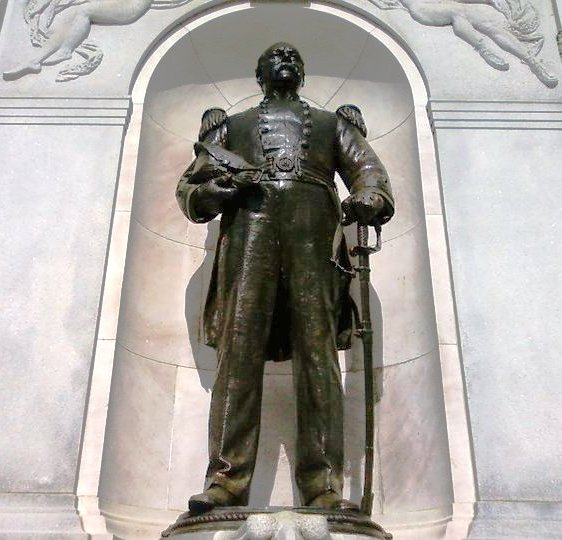
Close-up of the statue

The memorial consists of a bronze statue of Perkins surrounded by a granite and Tennessee marble structure. This structure has dimensions of 42 feet (13 m) long, 20 feet (6.1 m) wide, and 20 feet (6.1 m) high and takes the form of an exedra. Pedestals mark the ends of this exedra. The statue is situated in a niche within the structure, standing on a granite block that has been shaped to resemble a ship's prow. Atop the niche is a keystone which has allegorical depictions of Peace and War in bas-reliefs. On either side of the niche are depictions of an eagle atop a Doric column with a seal imposed on the column. On one side, it depicts the seal of New Hampshire, while on the other side, the seal of the United States Naval Academy.

The statue has a height of 7.5 feet (2.3 m), a length of 26 inches (0.66 m), and a width of 35 inches (0.89 m). Perkins is depicted in full dress uniform, with his left hand resting on the hilt of his sword while his right hand holds his hat. In addition to the statue, there are also two bronze tablets located at either end of the exedra which depict scenes from the Battle of Mobile Bay and the Capture of New Orleans. The Mobile Bay tablet bears the inscription "MOBILE BAY / AUGUST V. MCDDLXIV / AFTER A SEVERE BATTLE WITH THE / CHICKASAW THE / TENNESSEE SURRENDERED", while the New Orleans tablet says "APRIL XXIV MDCCCLXII / IN THE MISSISSIPPI RIVER / BELOW FORT ST PHILIP THE / CAYUGA DEFEATED THREE REBEL / GUNBOATS INCLUDING THE GOVERNOR / MOORE AND THE RAM MANASSAS". A tablet located on the rear of the memorial describes the donation of the statue, with an inscription reading "ERECTED IN LOVING MEMORY / BY HIS / WIFE AND DAUGHTER". Foundry marks are also present on the rear of the memorial.

Beneath the statue is the following inscription:

GEORGE HAMILTON PERKINS / COMMODORE UNITED STATES NAVY / BORN AT HOPKINTON, NEW HAMPSHIRE, OCTOBER 20, 1835 / DIED AT BOSTON, MASSACHUSETTS, OCTOBER 28, 1899 / ENTERED THE NAVY AS MIDSHIPMAN OCTOBER 1, 1851 AND / SERVED HIS COUNTRY WITH HONOR FORTY EIGHT YEARS / GENIAL AND LOVABLE AS A MAN - ABLE AND RESOURCEFUL AS AN / OFFICER - GALLANT AND INSPIRING AS A LEADER - HIS INTREPID CONDUCT / AT THE PASSAGE OF THE FORTS BELOW NEW ORLEANS - HIS HEROISM AT / THE SURRENDER OF THAT CITY - HIS SKILL AND DARING ON NOTABLE / OCCASIONS ON THE MISSISSIPPI RIVER AND IN THE GULF OF MEXICO - HIS / ACHIEVEMENTS IN MOBILE BAY WHEN AS COMMANDER OF THE CHICKASAW / HE COMPELLED THE SURRENDER OF THE TENNESSEE WON FROM THE NAVY / UNQUALIFIED ADMIRATION AND FROM FARRAGUT THESE WORDS / "THE BRAVEST MAN THAT EVER TROD THE DECK OF A SHIP"

Additionally, the following inscription is located in front of the statue:

FORTS JACKSON AND ST. PHILIP / APRIL 24, 1862 / CAPTURE OF THE GOV. MOORE AND THREE / SHIPS OF THE MONTGOMERY FLOTILLA / BELOW NEW ORLEANS / APRIL 25, 1862 / SURRENDER OF NEW ORLEANS / APRIL 25, 1862 / SKIRMISHES ON THE MISSISSIPPI RIVER / JULY 1862 / PORT HUDSON AND WHITEHALL'S POINT / JULY 1863 / CAPTURE OF THE MARY SORLEY / APRIL 7, 1864 / BATTLE OF MOBILE BAY / AUGUST 5, 1864 / CAPTURE OF THE TENNESSEE / AUGUST 5, 1864 / FORT POWELL / AUGUST 5, 1864 / FORT GAINES / AUGUST 8, 1864 / FORT MORGAN / AUGUST 23, 1864

It is located on the west side of the State House, facing North State Street. Initially, the memorial was located about 50 feet (15 m) from the building. However, following an enlargement of the building in 1910, the outside wall of the State House comes out to the memorial, making it impossible to read the donation tablet on the memorial's rear.

== See also ==
- Public sculptures by Daniel Chester French

== Bibliography ==
- Alden, Carroll Storrs (1914). George Hamilton Perkins, Commodore, U. S. N.: His Life and Letters. Houghton Mifflin Company. ISBN 978-0-7222-8366-0.
- Holzer, Harold (2019). Monument Man: The Life and Art of Daniel Chester French. Chronicle Books. ISBN 978-1-61689-829-8.
- "Commodore George Hamilton Perkins". New Hampshire Division of Historical Resources. Archived from the original on March 26, 2016.
- Official Proceedings at the Dedication of the Statue of Commodore George Hamilton Perkins at Concord, New Hampshire, on the 25th Day of April, 1902. Concord, New Hampshire: Rumford Printing Company. 1903.
- "Commodore George Hamilton Perkins, (sculpture)". Smithsonian Institution Research Information System. Archived from the original on May 28, 2021.
- "This Week in Concord History". The Concord Insider. April 25, 2017. Archived from the original on May 4, 2017.
