= Larz Anderson House =

Historic house in Washington, D.C., United States

- Anderson House
- U.S. National Register of Historic Places
- U.S. National Historic Landmark
- U.S. Historic district – Contributing property
- D.C. Inventory of Historic Sites
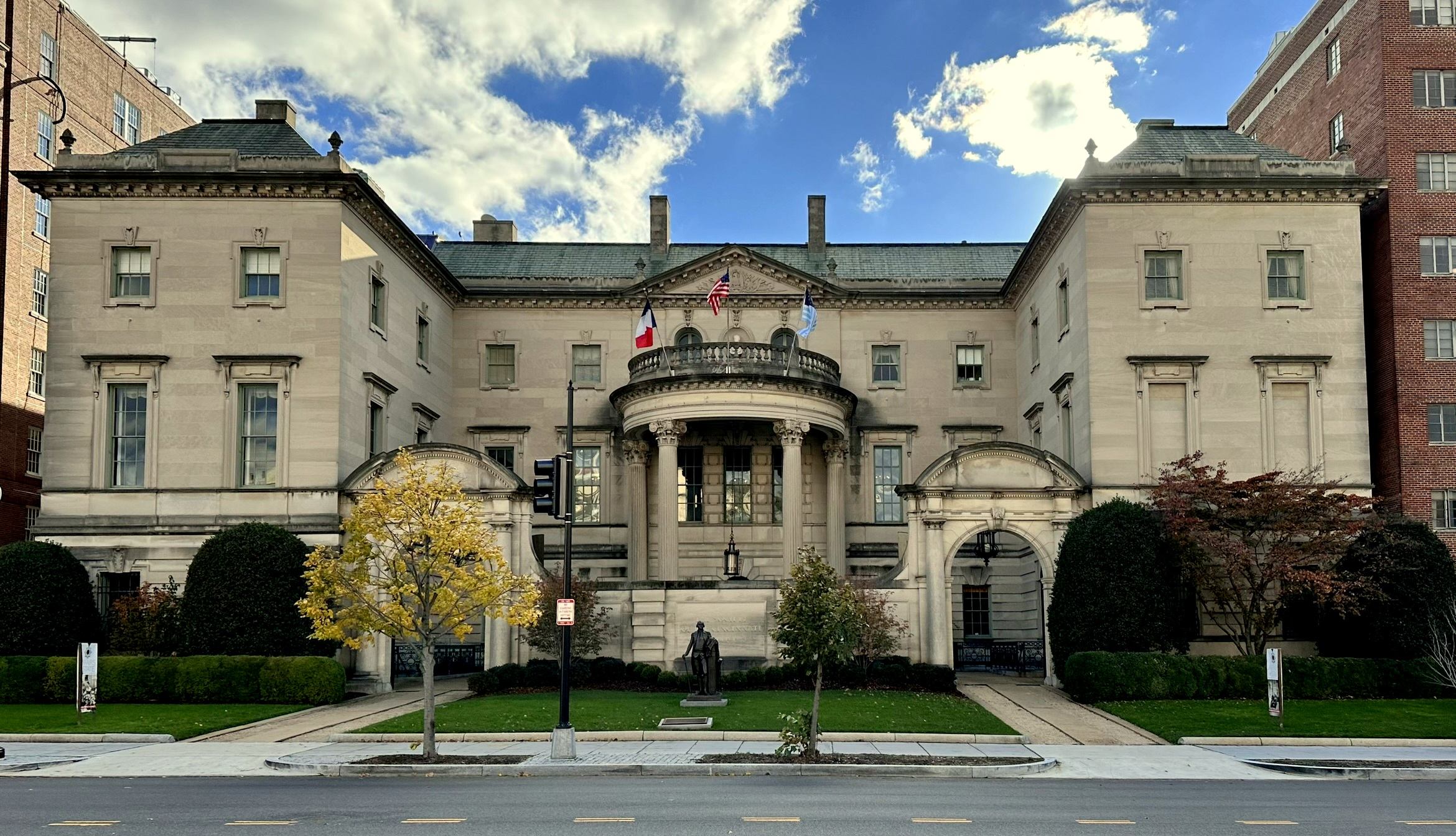
- Exterior view of Anderson House in 2023

- Location within Washington, D.C.
- Location: 2118 Massachusetts Avenue, NW; Washington, D.C.
- Coordinates: 38°54′38.6″N 77°2′51.7″W
- Built: 1902–1905
- Architect: Little & Browne
- Architectural style: Beaux-Arts
- Part of: Massachusetts Avenue Historic District (ID74002166)
- NRHP reference No.: 71000993

Significant dates
- Added to NRHP: April 7, 1971
- Designated NHL: June 19, 1996
- Designated DCIHS: November 8, 1964

Anderson House, also known as Larz Anderson House, is a Gilded Age mansion located at 2118 Massachusetts Avenue, NW, on Embassy Row in the Dupont Circle neighborhood of Washington, D.C. It now houses the Society of the Cincinnati's international headquarters and a research library on 17th- and 18th-century military and naval history and the art of war. It is also open to the public as a historic house museum about life in Washington in the early 20th century.

== History ==
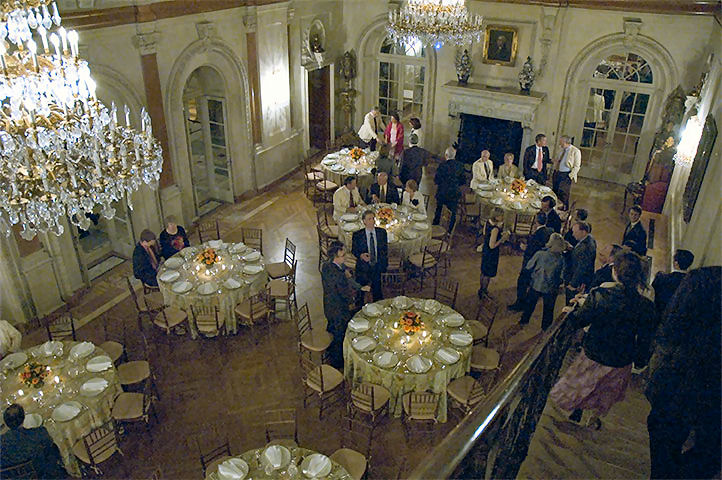
The ballroom at Anderson House

Anderson House was built between 1902 and 1905 as the winter residence of Larz Anderson, an American diplomat, and his wife, Isabel Weld Perkins, an author and American Red Cross volunteer. Architects Arthur Little and Herbert W. C. Browne of Boston, Massachusetts, designed the home in the Beaux-Arts style.

The Andersons used the house to entertain the social and political elite of America and abroad, as well as to showcase their collection of fine art and historic artifacts that the couple acquired in their extensive travels over the 40 years of their marriage. The Andersons had no children. Following Larz Anderson's death in 1937, his widow donated the house and its contents to the Society of the Cincinnati, of which Larz Anderson had been a devoted member for more than 40 years. The society opened Anderson House as a museum in 1939. The house was listed on the National Register of Historic Places in 1971 and was further designated a National Historic Landmark in 1996.

Today, Anderson House continues to serve its members and the public as a headquarters, museum, and library. Visitors to the museum at Anderson House can tour the first two floors of the house, decorated with the Andersons' collection and interpreted to illuminate the world of entertaining and collecting in Washington. Visitors can also view changing exhibitions devoted to the history of the American Revolution, the Society of the Cincinnati, and Anderson House and its occupants.

In addition to the Andersons' original collection, the society's museum collections include portraits, armaments, and personal artifacts of Revolutionary War soldiers; commemorative objects made to remember the war and its participants; objects associated with the history of the society and its members, including Society of the Cincinnati china and insignia; portraits and personal artifacts of members of the Anderson family; and artifacts related to the history of the house, including the U.S. Navy's occupation of it during World War II. Anderson House has been featured on the A&E television series America's Castles, as well as C-SPAN.

== See also ==
- National Register of Historic Places listings in Washington, D.C.
- Statue of George Washington (Houdon)

== Bibliography ==
- Isabel Anderson, ed., Larz Anderson: Letters and Journals of a Diplomat (New York: Fleming H. Revell, 1940).
- James M. Goode and Bruce M. White, Capital Houses: Historic Residences of Washington D.C. and Its Environs, 1735–1965 (New York: Acanthus Press, 2015).
- Stephen T. Moskey, Larz and Isabel Anderson: Wealth and Celebrity in the Gilded Age (Bloomington, IN: iUniverse, 2016). ISBN 978-1-4917-8874-5 OCLC 946482599
- Emily Schulz, “In Stone and Steel: The Construction of Anderson House” Cincinnati Fourteen 41:2 (2005), pp. 18–31.
