= USS Perkins (DD-877) =

Gearing-class destroyer

Coordinates: 39.250°S 57.000°W

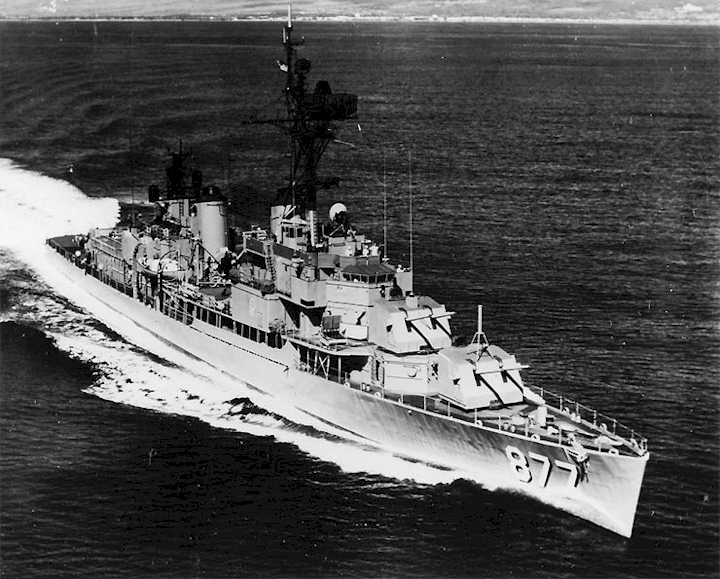
- Perkins underway following her FRAM II modernization, c. mid-1960s.

History

United States
- Name: USS Perkins
- Namesake: George H. Perkins
- Builder: Consolidated Steel Corporation, Orange, Texas
- Laid down: 19 June 1944
- Launched: 7 December 1944
- Commissioned: 4 April 1945
- Decommissioned: 15 January 1973
- Reclassified: DDR–877, 18 February 1949; DD-877, 30 September 1962
- Stricken: 15 January 1973
- Identification: Callsign: NPOV; Hull number: DD-877
- Fate: Transferred to Argentina, 15 January 1973

Argentina
- Name: ARA Comodoro Py
- Acquired: 15 January 1973
- Stricken: 1984
- Identification: D 27
- Fate: Sunk as a target, 15 June 1987

Class overview
- Preceded by: Seguí class
- Succeeded by: Hércules class

General characteristics
- Class & type: Gearing-class destroyer
- Displacement: 3,460 long tons (3,516 t) full
- Length: 390 ft 6 in (119.02 m)
- Beam: 40 ft 10 in (12.45 m)
- Draft: 14 ft 4 in (4.37 m)
- Propulsion: Geared turbines, 2 shafts, 60,000 shp (45 MW)
- Speed: 35 knots (65 km/h; 40 mph)
- Range: 4,500 nmi (8,300 km) at 20 kn (37 km/h; 23 mph)
- Complement: 336
- Armament: 6 × 5"/38 caliber guns; 12 × 40 mm AA guns; 11 × 20 mm AA guns; 10 × 21 inch (533 mm) torpedo tubes; 6 × depth charge projectors; 2 × depth charge tracks

USS Perkins (DD/DDR-877) was a Gearing-class destroyer in the United States Navy. She was the third Navy ship named for Commodore George H. Perkins USN (1835–1899).

Perkins was laid down by the Consolidated Steel Corporation at Orange, Texas on 19 June 1944, launched on 7 December 1944 by Mrs. Larz Anderson (Isabel Weld Perkins) and commissioned on 4 April 1945.

== Service history ==
=== 1945–1949 ===
Following shakedown off Cuba, Perkins entered the Norfolk Navy Yard for conversion to a radar picket destroyer. In July 1945 she underwent refresher training, rendezvoused with the aircraft carrier Boxer on 20 July, and headed for the Pacific. At Pearl Harbor she joined Destroyer Division 52 (DesDiv 52) and on 19 August sailed for the Far East. She entered Tokyo Bay the day of the formal Japanese surrender, on 2 September, and on the 3rd joined Task Force 38 (TF 38). Operations in the Marshalls, Marianas, and off Japan followed and in April 1946 she returned to Pearl Harbor. On the 28th she arrived at San Diego, California whence she operated for the next year.

In May 1947, she returned to the Far East for three months on the China station, two weeks of which were spent off Qinhuangdao, on the Bohai Sea, observing Communist Chinese forces.

Perkins returned to California in October and in January 1948 sailed to the Marshalls for the atomic bomb test series "Operation Sandstone". Overhaul followed her return to San Diego in June and on 4 January 1949 she departed the west coast for another tour off the China coast. Arriving at Qingdao on 7 February, she was redesignated DDR–877 on 18 February. Scheduled exercises soon began, but, in addition, she was called on to lift foreign residents of Tsingtao to Hong Kong as Communist forces took over the former city in May. In June she battled her first typhoon, and after visiting Singapore in August, she returned to San Diego.

=== 1950–1959 ===
Engaged in training exercises off the west coast and yard overhaul for the next year, Perkins, reassigned to DesDiv 11, sailed west again in mid-August 1950. She served on SAR station in the central Pacific, returned to the west coast in October, and on 2 February 1951 got underway for the embattled coast of Korea. Between March and September she performed screening and plane guard duties for the carriers of TF 77 and carried out gunfire support and shore bombardment missions with TF 95. On 25 September Perkins arrived at Yokosuka, Japan from the bombline and the next day continued on toward the United States. In June 1952 she returned to Korea. She spent July entirely on the bombline, shifted briefly to TF 77, then steamed south for duty on the Taiwan Patrol. By 8 September she was back on the bombline. On 15 October, while covering minesweeping operations preparatory to an amphibious feint against Kojo, 35 miles (56 km) north of the battlefront, one of her crew was killed and 17 were wounded by two near misses from Communist shore batteries. Only slightly damaged, she continued her combat activities and for the remainder of her tour alternated gunfire support operations with carrier escort duties.

At the end of the year Perkins returned to the United States. In July 1953 she completed a six-month overhaul and in August she returned to the Far East. There six months she patrolled off the Korean coast and Taiwan Strait and participated in exercises from Japan to the Philippines. After that deployment Perkins continued to rotate between duty with the 7th Fleet in the western Pacific and operations with the 1st Fleet off the west coast. In July 1956 she contributed to the information gathering effort of the International Geophysical Year (IGY) by "chasing" weather balloons and in September 1959 helped TF 77 forestall overt hostilities during the Laotian crisis.

=== 1960–1973 ===
In March 1962 she entered the Long Beach Naval Shipyard for Fleet Rehabilitation and Modernization (FRAM). Redesignated DD-877, on 30 September, she emerged from the Mark II overhaul and conversion in December with a new superstructure configured for QH-50 DASH. The "new" destroyer spent the next ten months exercising off the west coast and in mid-October 1963 resumed annual deployments to WestPac, her first mission to conduct operations with the carrier Hancock in the South China Sea. Continuing to alternate 7th Fleet and 1st Fleet duty tours into 1970, each of Perkins's WestPac deployments returned her to the South China Sea where, off the coast of Vietnam, she served as plane guard for carriers on "Yankee Station" in the Tonkin Gulf, participated in "Sea Dragon" and "Market Time" operations, patrolled on search and rescue duties and carried out naval gunfire support missions during the conflict.

=== Argentine service ===
Perkins was decommissioned and stricken from the Naval Vessel Register on 15 January 1973, transferred to Argentina. She was renamed ARA Comodoro Py (D-27), and served in the Argentine Navy. She was stricken in 1984.

On 15 June 1987, Comodoro Py was sunk as a target off Mar del Plata by a torpedo fired from the Argentine Navy TR-1700-class submarine ARA Santa Cruz.

== Awards ==
Perkins earned three battle stars during the Korean War.
