= Landstuhl (disambiguation) =

Landstuhl is a town in Rhineland-Palatinate, Germany.

Landstuhl may also refer to:

== Places ==
- Landstuhl Air Base, former name of Ramstein Air Base
- Landstuhl Marsh, a region in West Palatinate
- Municipal Association of Landstuhl, a municipal association in Rhineland-Palatinate, Germany

== Other uses ==
- Landstuhl Elementary Middle School, a U.S. Department of Defense Dependents School
- Landstuhl Regional Medical Center, a U.S. Army post and hospital in western Germany
- Landstuhl station, a railway station in Landstuhl

== See also ==
- Landstuhl–Kusel railway, a railway line
