= Contoocook, New Hampshire =

Census-designated place in New Hampshire, United States

- Census-designated place
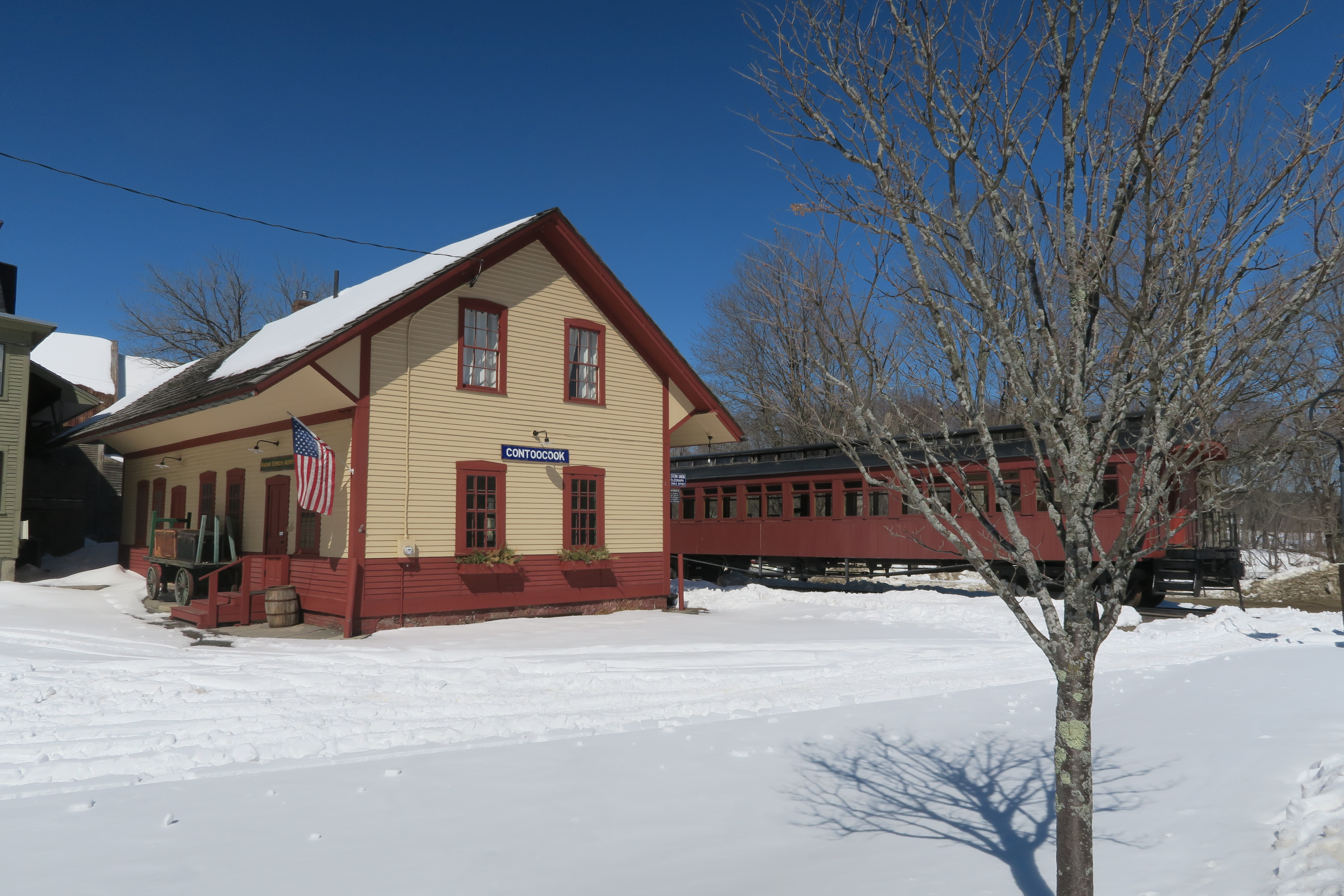
- Contoocook Railroad Depot
- Nickname: Tooky
- Location in Merrimack County and the state of New Hampshire.
- Coordinates: 43°13′23″N 71°42′47″W
- Country: United States
- State: New Hampshire
- County: Merrimack
- Town: Hopkinton

Area
  - Total: 2.40 sq mi (6.22 km^{2})
  - Land: 2.30 sq mi (5.96 km^{2})
  - Water: 0.10 sq mi (0.27 km^{2})
- Elevation: 358 ft (109 m)

Population (2020)
  - Total: 1,427
  - Density: 620.3/sq mi (239.48/km^{2})
- Time zone: UTC-5 (Eastern (EST))
  - Summer (DST): UTC-4 (EDT)
- ZIP Code: 03229
- Area code: 603
- FIPS code: 33-14340
- GNIS feature ID: 2378056

Contoocook (/kənˈtʊkək/) is a village and census-designated place (CDP) within the town of Hopkinton, New Hampshire, United States. The population was 1,427 at the 2020 census. Contoocook is well known for its growth of small businesses, preservation of historical landmarks, community involvement and recreational activities within the village.

== History ==
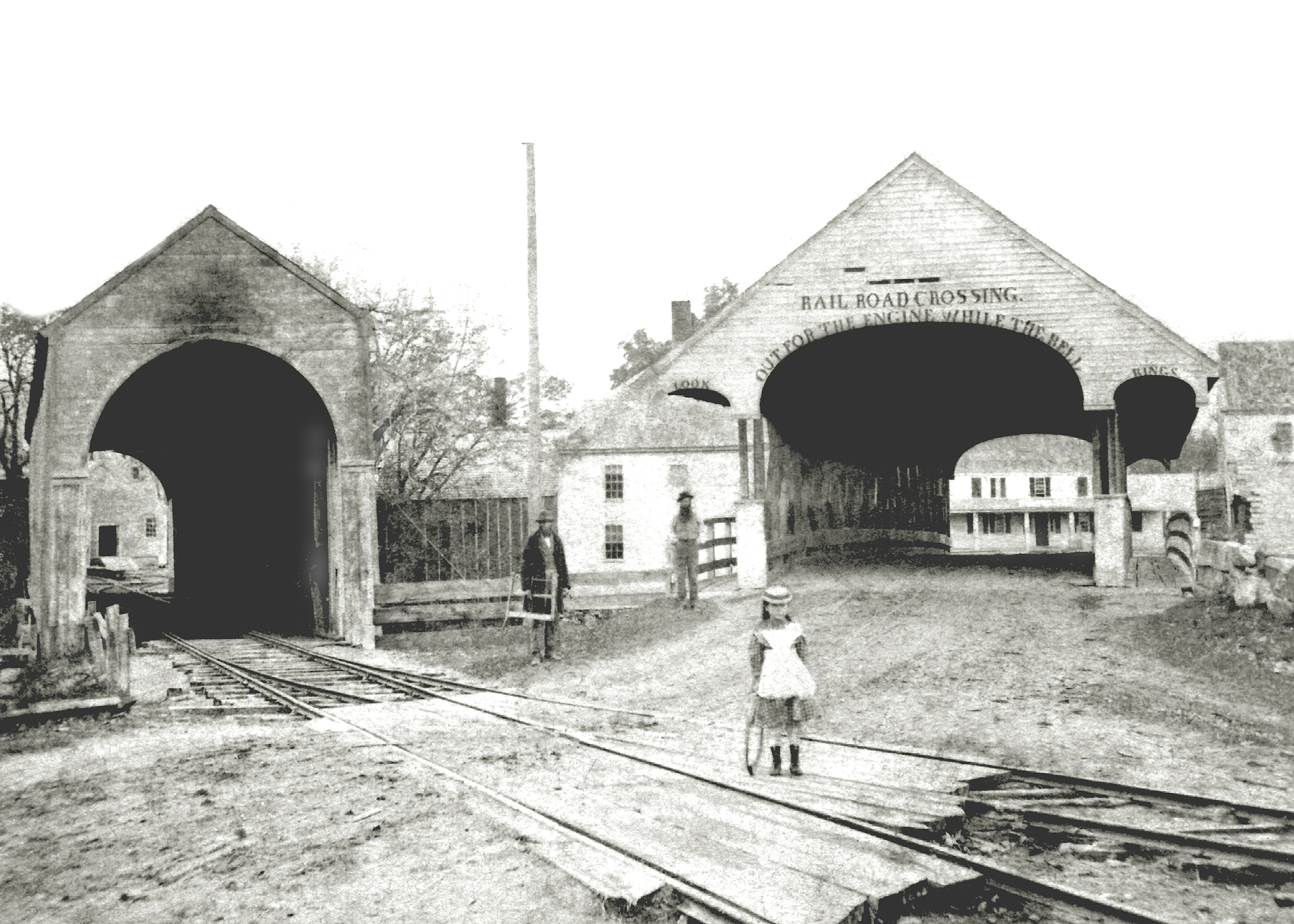
Original covered railroad bridge (left) and covered highway bridge (right)

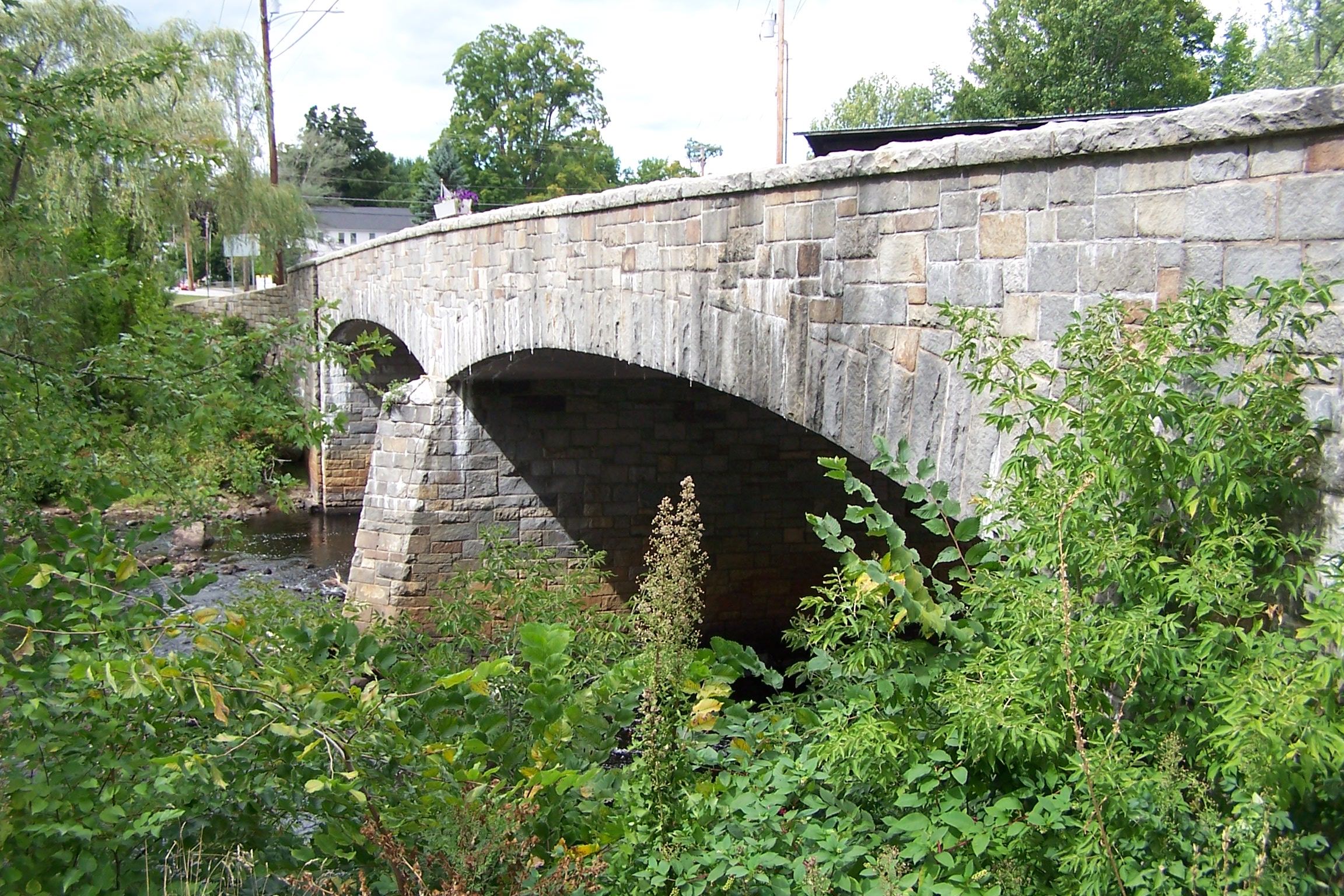
Stone arch bridge over the Contoocook River in the village center

The village is named after the Contoocook River that runs through it. The name Contoocook comes from the Pennacook tribe of Native Americans and perhaps means "place of the river near pines". Other variations of the name include the Abenaki meaning "nut trees river" or Natick language meaning "small plantation at the river". In previous centuries the area was known as "Contoocookville". It is the birthplace of Civil War naval officer George H. Perkins. His daughter Isabel Weld Perkins and his son-in-law Larz Anderson maintained Perkins Manor as one of several summer homes.

In describing the approach to Perkins Manor one commentator writes:

"In passing up the Concord and Claremont Railroad from Concord, the observant traveler has doubtless noticed the substantial and comfortable-looking homestead with large and trim front yard, shaded by thickly planted and generous topped maples, on the right-hand side of the road after crossing the bridge that spans 'Contoocook's bright and brimming river' at the pleasant-looking village of Contoocookville in the northern part of Hopkinton."

== Geography ==
Contoocook is located in the northern part of the town of Hopkinton. New Hampshire Route 103 passes through the center of the village as Main Street and Park Avenue. New Hampshire Route 127 enters the village from the south as Maple Street and joins NH 103 along Park Avenue departing to the north. Interstate 89 runs along the western edge of the community, with access from Exit 6 (NH 127). I-89 leads southeast 12 miles (19 km) to Interstate 93 in the town of Bow, just south of Concord, the state capital. I-89 leads northwest 45 miles (72 km) to Lebanon. NH 103 leads southeast 3 miles (5 km) to Hopkinton village and northwest 7 miles (11 km) to Warner. NH 127 leads southwest 4 miles (6 km) to West Hopkinton and north 19 miles (31 km) to Franklin.

According to the United States Census Bureau, the Contoocook CDP has a total area of 2.40 square miles (6.22 km^{2}), of which 2.30 square miles (5.96 km^{2}) are land and 0.10 square miles (0.27 km^{2}), or 4.26%, are water. The Contoocook River flows through the center of the village, and the Warner River forms the northern edge of the community, flowing into the Contoocook.

== Demographics ==
Historical population
Census	Pop.	Note	%±
1980	1,499		—
1990	1,334		−11.0%
2000	1,444		8.2%
2010	1,444		0.0%
2020	1,427		−1.2%
U.S. Decennial Census

As of the census of 2010, there were 1,444 people, 610 households, and 397 families residing in the CDP. There were 638 housing units, of which 28, or 4.4%, were vacant. The racial makeup of the CDP was 97.9% white, 0.7% African American, 0.2% Native American, 0.3% Asian, 0.1% some other race, and 0.8% from two or more races. 1.2% of the population were Hispanic or Latino of any race.

Of the 610 households in the CDP, 30.3% had children under the age of 18 living with them, 52.1% were headed by married couples living together, 8.2% had a female householder with no husband present, and 34.9% were non-families. 28.2% of all households were made up of individuals, and 13.2% were someone living alone who was 65 years of age or older. The average household size was 2.37, and the average family size was 2.92.

23.1% of residents in the CDP were under the age of 18, 6.1% were from 18 to 24, 20.7% were from 25 to 44, 32.1% were from 45 to 64, and 17.9% were 65 years of age or older. The median age was 45.0 years. For every 100 females, there were 100.6 males. For every 100 females age 18 and over, there were 95.9 males.

For the period 2011–15, the estimated median annual income for a household was $84,083, and the median income for a family was $90,833. The per capita income for the CDP was $27,077.

== Sites of interest ==
For sites of interest, see Hopkinton, New Hampshire

== Notable people ==
For notable people, see Hopkinton, New Hampshire
