= Perkins Manor (Contoocook, New Hampshire) =

Coordinates: 43.2224°N 71.7139°W

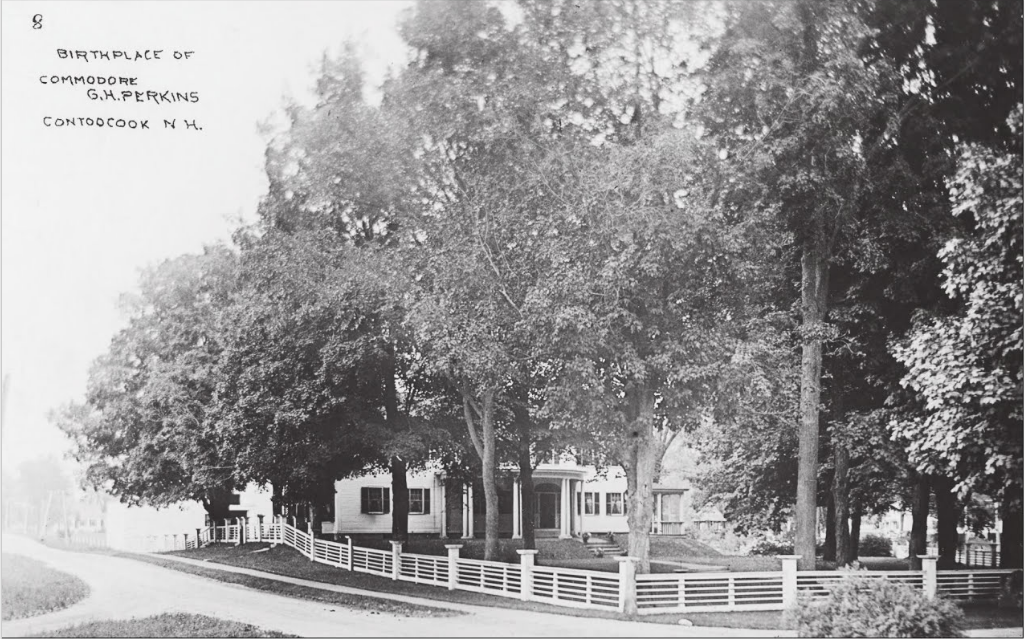
- Early photograph of Perkins Manor
- Interactive map of the Perkins Manor area

General information
- Location: Contoocook, New Hampshire
- Completed: 1825
- Owner: Private

Perkins Manor is a historic building in Contoocook, New Hampshire. It is the birthplace of Commodore George H. Perkins and later served as one of several homes of his daughter Isabel Weld Perkins and her husband Larz Anderson.

One 19th century commentator described the approach to the house thus:

In passing up the Concord and Claremont Railroad from Concord, the observant traveler has doubtless noticed the substantial and comfortable-looking homestead with large and trim front yard, shaded by thickly planted and generous topped maples, on the right-hand side of the road after crossing the bridge that spans "Contoocook's bright and brimming river" at the pleasant-looking village of Contoocookville in the northern part of Hopkinton.

== History ==
In 1825, Roger Eliot Perkins came from the vicinity of Salem, Massachusetts and built Perkins Manor on land purchased from the Algonquians.

His property passed to his son, Hamilton Eliot Perkins, a counselor-at-law and member of the Merrimack County bar. This Perkins built profitable mills at Contoocookville (now called Contoocook) on the Contoocook River.

Commodore Perkins as a young midshipman during the 1850s

Hamilton Eliot Perkins married Clara Bartlett George. Their son George Hamilton Perkins (the future commodore) was born here in 1835. When he was eight years old, the family moved to Boston. Here Hamilton Eliot Perkins invested his means in shipping, including trade with West Africa.

After her father's death Isabel Anderson purchased the house from her father's estate -- he left the bulk of his estate to a nephew rather than to his wife or daughter -- and opened it to the public for a few summers. Visitors entered to the sight of an elaborate, crystal chandelier. The stairs were carpeted with bright red, thick carpeting. On each side of the hall was a formal parlor. One parlor was lavishly decorated in red velvet with beautiful antique furniture. The other parlor was done in blue velvet.

From the blue parlor was a large dining room furnished with antiques. There were swinging glass doors from the dining room to a butler's pantry. The kitchen was very large with many shelves, a large cupboard and a large pantry. Upstairs there was a spacious hall. From it were four equally spacious bedrooms, each one elegantly furnished.

Isabel Anderson occasionally stayed in the house, but preferred her own small, rustic summer camp in a rural area of southern New Hampshire that she used as a writing retreat and for visits with her relatives.

== Today ==
Perkins Manor is now an apartment house consisting of eight residential units. It is the largest residential building in Contoocook.

== Bibliography ==
- Anderson, Larz: Letters and Journals of a Diplomat, New York, 1940.
- Anderson, Isabel Under the Black Horse Flag, Boston, 1926
- Moskey, Stephen T: Larz and Isabel Anderson: Wealth and Celebrity in the Gilded Age, (iUniverse 2016) ISBN 978-1-4917-8874-5 OCLC 946482599.
