= Larz Anderson Auto Museum =

Coordinates: 42.31055°N 71.13482°W

- The Carriage House of Larz Anderson Auto Museum
- U.S. Historic district – Contributing property
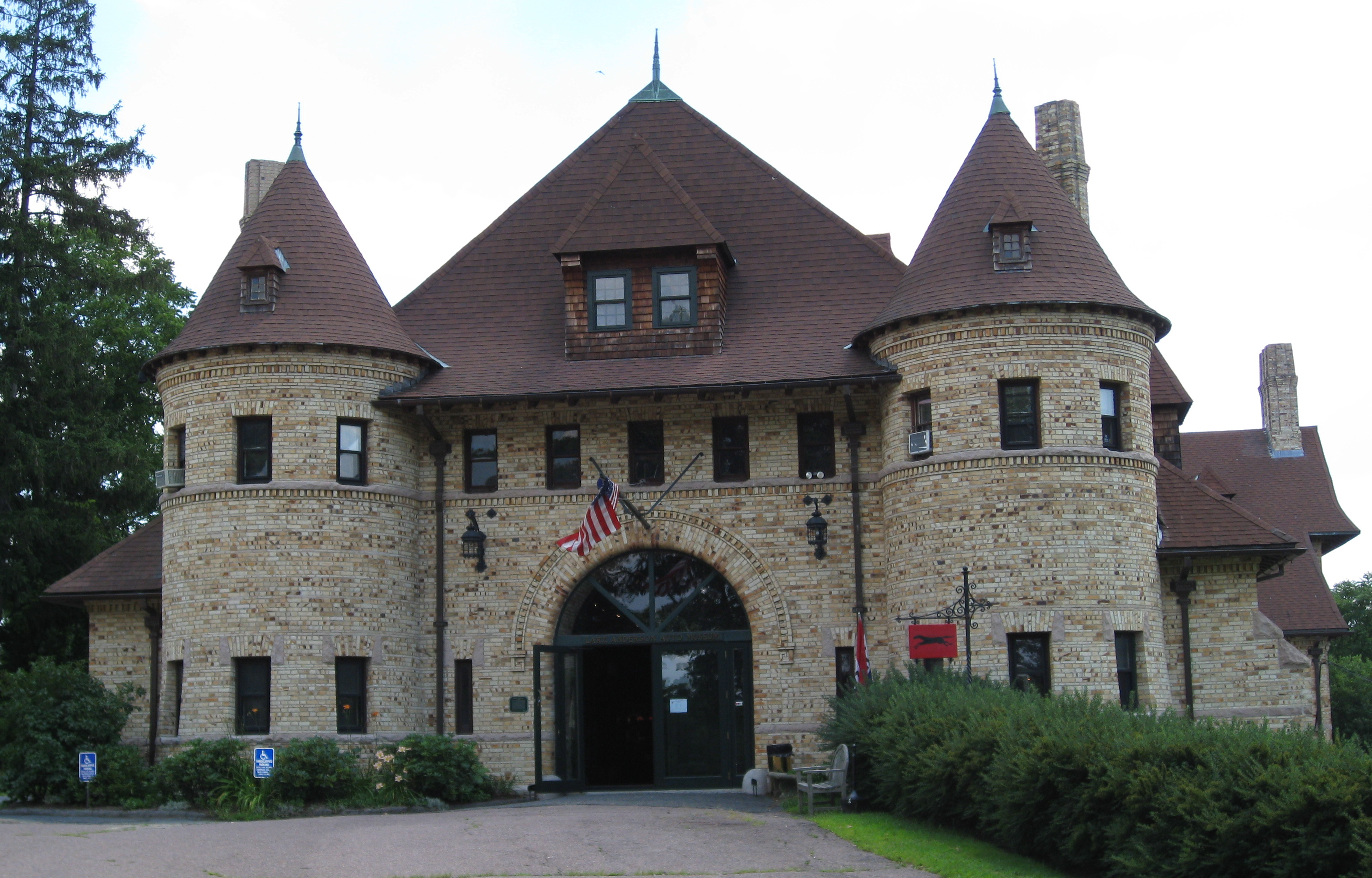
- Carriage House
- Location: Boston and Brookline, Massachusetts
- Built: 1888; 138 years ago
- Architect: Edmund M. Wheelwright
- Part of: Larz Anderson Park Historic District (ID85003245)
- MPS: Brookline MRA
- Added to NRHP: October 17, 1985

Larz Anderson Auto Museum is located in the Anderson Carriage House on the grounds of Larz Anderson Park in Brookline, Massachusetts, and is the oldest collection of motorcars in the United States.

The museum is a non-profit educational institution with community events, lectures, children's programs, walking tours of the park, and an ever-changing series of exhibits on motor vehicles and the automobile's impact on society and culture.

== History ==
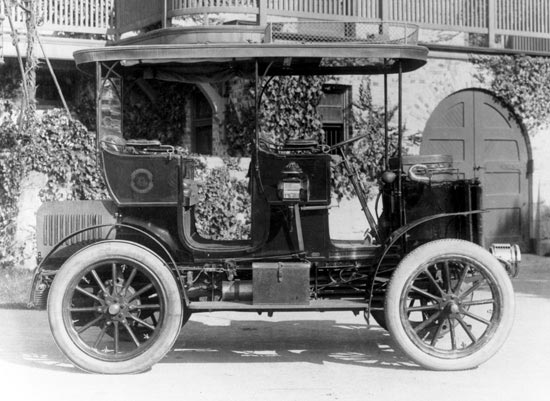
Gardner-Serpollet of 1903, now exhibited in the Larz Anderson Auto Museum

The collection was begun by Larz Anderson and Isabel Weld Perkins soon after they married. In 1899 they purchased a true "horseless carriage" made by the Winton Motor Carriage Company. In the following decades, the Andersons purchased at least thirty-two new motorcars. Their collection also included twenty-four horse-drawn carriages and six sleighs.

As their cars became obsolete, the Andersons retired them to the Carriage House of their 64-acre (26 ha) estate in Greater Boston. By 1927, the Andersons opened the Carriage House to the public for tours of their vehicles. When Isabel Anderson died in 1948, she bequeathed her entire Brookline estate (including mansion, carriage house, and land) to the Town of Brookline. She stipulated in her will that the motorcar collection be known as the "Larz Anderson Collection," and that a non-profit be given stewardship of the collection.

== Carriage House ==
The Carriage House which the museum occupies was designed by the Boston architect Edmund M. Wheelwright and completed in 1888. Its design was heavily influenced by the Château de Chaumont-sur-Loire in France. Gigantic in scale, the building stored carriages, housed horses, and served as home to stable staff who lived on the upper floor. Soon after the Andersons began collecting automobiles, they added a garage on the basement level for vehicle repair.

== Collection ==
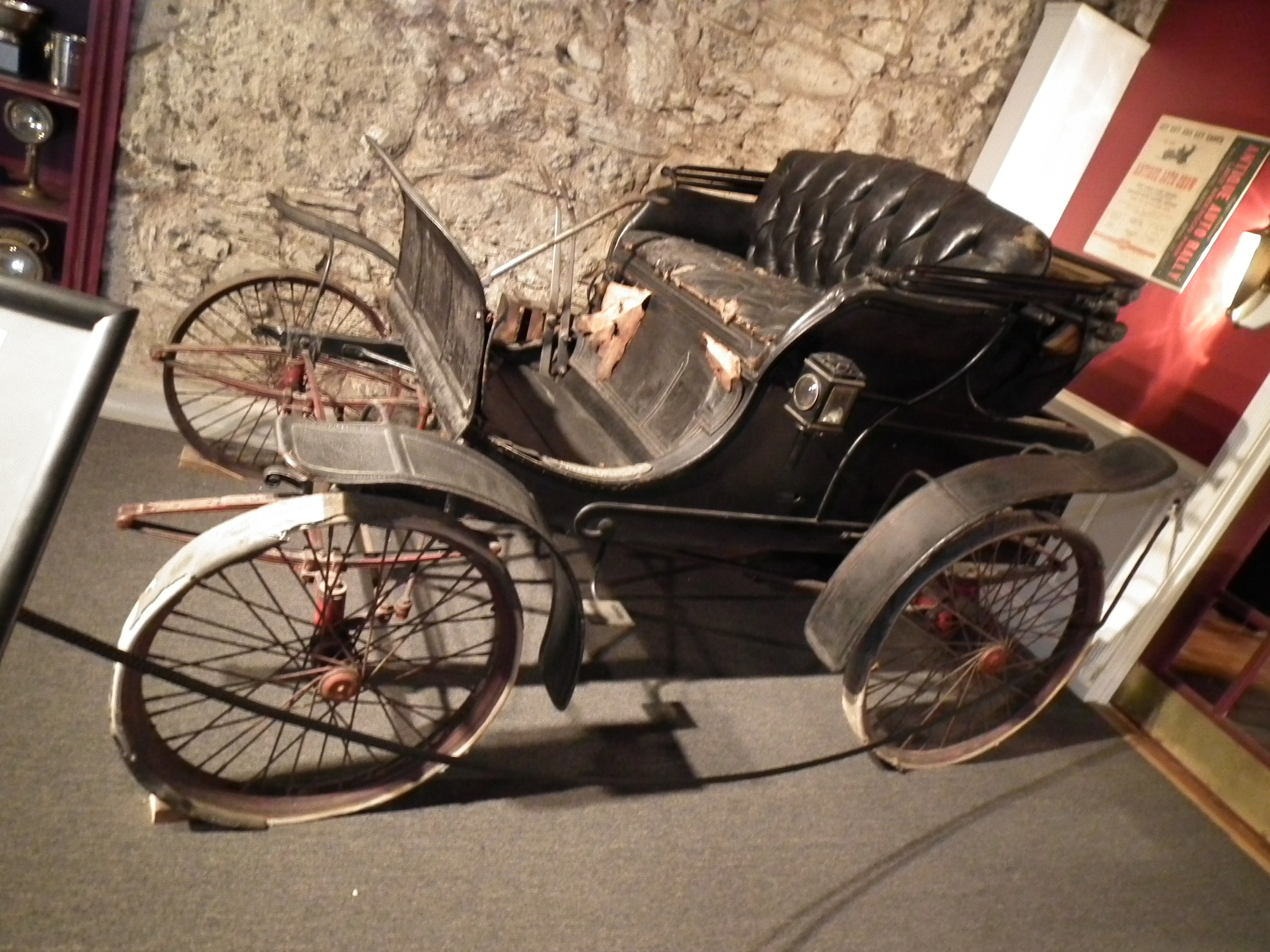
1899 Winton Phaeton on display

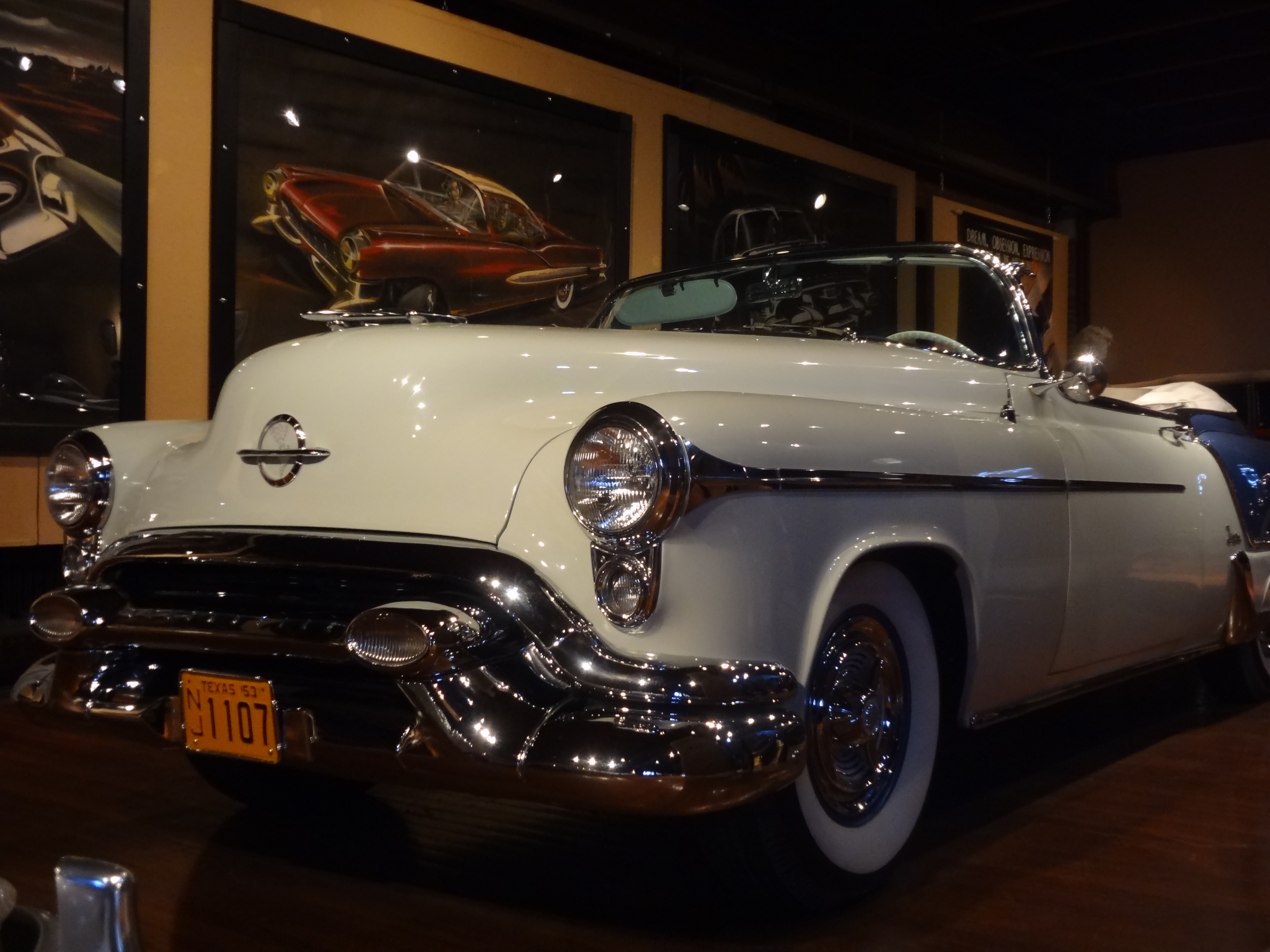
1953 Oldsmobile Fiesta on display

Of the original thirty-two motor vehicles, the following fourteen remain in the collection:

- 1899 Winton Phaeton
- 1900 Rochet-Schneider
- 1901 Winton Bullet
- 1903 Gardner-Serpollet
- 1905 Electromobile
- 1906 Charron-Girodot et Voigt
- 1907 Fiat
- 1908 Bailey Electric
- 1910 Panhard et Levassor
- 1912 Renault
- 1916 Packard Twin Six
- 1924 Renault Torpedo
- 1925 Luxor Taxi
- 1926 Lincoln Limousine

== Non-motorized transports ==
In addition to some of the original horse-drawn carriages and sleighs owned by the Andersons or their Weld forebears, the museum is home to the vintage bicycle collection of Dr. Ralph W. Galen, a local cycling enthusiast.

== Events ==
The museum sponsors a variety of activities throughout the year that attract enthusiasts of specific motor vehicles from throughout the Northeastern United States, many of whom arrive in their own rare vehicles to a gathering of like-minded hobbyists.

A sampling of these events include British Car Day, Cadillac Day, Corvette Day, German Car Day, Swedish Car Day, Antique Car Day, Tutto Italiano (an event specializing in Italian automobiles), Japanese Car Day, Miata Day, Micro Mini Day, Extinct Auto Day, and many more. A complete listing of the Lawn Events can be found on the museum's website (www.larzanderson.org).

The museum also attracts visitors with lectures on various subjects relating to transportation or local history, as well as musical entertainment in "The Carriage House Concert Series".

The museum began offering "rolling" events, which are organized drives for museum members and other automotive enthusiasts. There have been both overnight events, in which participants travel together and stay overnight in a hotel or inn, as well as single-day events, that originate in the greater Boston area and take members to a destination, usually within 2 to 2.5 hours in distance.

== Library ==
The Library and Archives at Larz Anderson Auto Museum are devoted to materials relating automobile, racing and motor transportation history. There are also some documents related to carriages, motorcycles and bicycles. The facility also houses an extensive archival holding of Packard Motor Company materials.

The library is a repository for information related to the state and to the Andersons themselves, including a collection of books, plays, and volumes of poetry authored by Isabel Anderson.

== Former history and holdings ==
In 1971, in cooperation with the Veteran Motor Car Club of America, the Andersons' carriage house became known as the Museum of Transportation, under the direction of Duncan Smith. Smith led a young, enthusiastic staff at this location for six years. He was especially proud of a multi-media presentation chronicling the invention and refinement of the bicycle; it was then the only world-class history of the bicycle on exhibit in the United States. The museum's halls featured rotating exhibits of automobiles, motorcycles, carriages, and bicycles. The museum's collection of antique-auto newsreel footage broadened into a library of vintage movie comedies, displaying vehicles of the 1920s in motion. Museum visitors had the opportunity to see high-wheeled-bicycle demonstrations, and ride in a vintage-1937 fire engine named for Boston Pops conductor and firefighting-memorabilia enthusiast Arthur Fiedler.

The Museum of Transportation at Larz Anderson Park closed on December 31, 1977, and effected a partnership with The Children's Museum of Boston. The museum reopened in 1979, sharing space with The Children's Museum at Museum Wharf in downtown Boston, but the joint venture was short-lived and the antique-auto contingent returned to its Anderson Park home in the 1980s.

Since then the museum continues to showcase exceptional examples of vintage motor vehicles. While maintaining the most precious "gems" of the original Larz Anderson Auto Collection, the museum no longer has the following: 1905 Walter Tractor & Victoria Carriage, 1907 Walter Brougham, 1910 American Underslung (designed by Harry Stutz), 1913 Hudson 33, 1917 Ford Model T Estate Wagon, 1918 Dodge, 1920 Dodge Truck, 1920 Dodge Hackney, 1924 Dodge Sedan, 1928 Nash Advanced Six, 1930 Packard Limousine, 1931 REO Flying Cloud 6-21, 1936 Dodge Station Wagon, 1938 Dodge Express Truck, 1939 GMC Truck, 1940 Ford Deluxe Wagon, 1941 Packard Suburban, 1947 Pontiac Sedan and the 1948 Ford Super Deluxe Wagon.

== Bibliography ==
- Anderson, Larz: Letters and Journals of a Diplomat, New York, 1940.
- Anderson, Isabella Under the Black Horse Flag, Boston, 1926
- Del Tredici, Peter: "Early American Bonsai: The Larz Anderson Collection of the Arnold Arboretum", Arnoldia (Summer 1989)
