= Larz Anderson Park =

Park in Brookline and Boston, Massachusetts

- Larz Anderson Park Historic District
- U.S. National Register of Historic Places
- U.S. Historic district
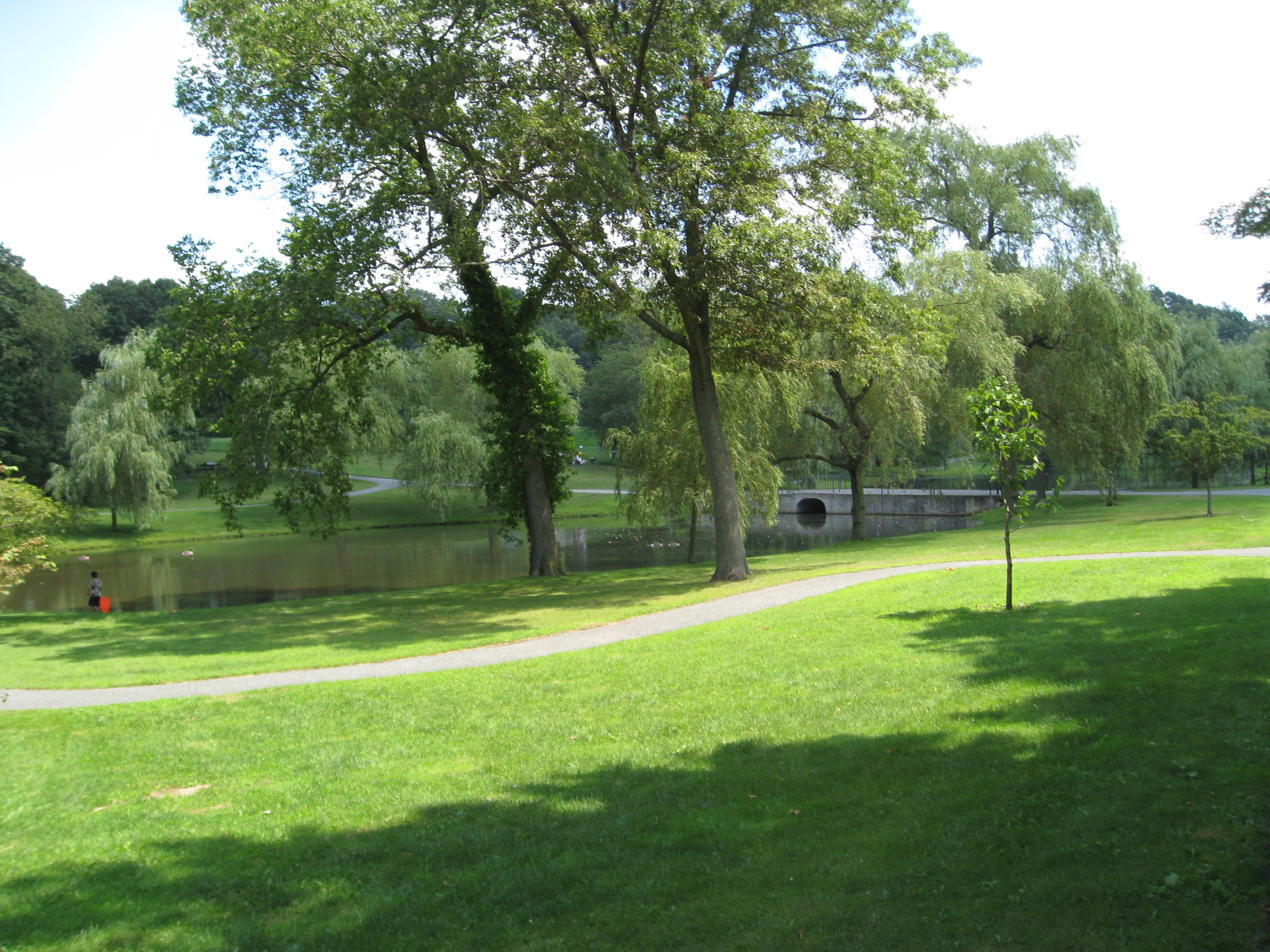
- General view

- Location within Massachusetts Location within the United States
- Location: Boston and Brookline, Massachusetts
- Coordinates: 42°18′43″N 71°8′10″W
- MPS: Brookline MRA
- NRHP reference No.: 85003245
- Added to NRHP: October 17, 1985

Larz Anderson Park is a wooded, landscaped, and waterscaped 64-acre (26 ha) parkland in Brookline, Massachusetts that is listed on the National Register of Historic Places. The southeast corner of the park is in Boston. The park contains playing fields, picnic areas, gardens, waterways, an ice skating rink, and two sites of special interest:

- Larz Anderson Auto Museum, the oldest automobile collection in the United States
- Putterham School, a one-room schoolhouse from colonial times

As Larz Anderson Park is about a half-mile away from Jamaica Pond it might also be considered a de facto extension of Boston's Emerald Necklace into the town of Brookline.

== Features ==
The park is set amidst a landscape of ponds and trees are athletic fields, historic buildings and Jack Kirrane ice skating rink. The Boston skyline can be seen from atop the main ridge and the open, rolling hills make the park one of the best kite-flying spots in the area. Brookline requires permits for the use of any of the park's 12 picnic tables, which offer access to barbecue grills, with a fee for non-residents.

The cavernous Carriage House houses the Larz Anderson Auto Museum. A self-guided walking tour brings visitors past museum, the Putterham School, the water garden, Chinese garden, Japanese garden, Italian garden and bowling green.

The Jack Kirrane Ice Skating Rink added in 1955, located on the site of the Andersons' Italian Garden, is named for Jack Kirrane, a Brookline native and captain of the 1960 gold medal-winning United States Olympic Ice Hockey team.

The project Public Art Comes to Larz Anderson Park sponsored by the Friends of Larz Anderson Park (FLAP) include the art sculptures 18-month installation, such as: June 2018 - December 2019 "Seeking Higher Ground An Avian Avatar" by the Myth Makers artists Donna Dodson and Andy Moerlein and Clown by Joseph Wheelwright (1948-2016);

== History ==
Cleared and developed as a farm in the 17th century by the Welds, in 1899 the estate was purchased from a fellow Weld Family member by socialite heiress Isabel Weld Perkins and her Paris-born diplomat husband Larz Anderson.

Crowning this Brookline property was a twenty-five room mansion overlooking the Boston skyline which the Andersons named "Weld" to honor Isabel's grandfather. They remodeled it to resemble Lulworth Castle, an ancestral home associated with the Welds. This became the Andersons' home for summers and Christmas holidays.

Their gardens, designed by Charles A. Platt, were featured in a 1904 issue of Town & Country. The accompanying photographs show lavishly ornate terraces laid out in Europe style. After Larz served as Ambassador to Japan, the Andersons improved the beautiful property still further and added the Chinese and Japanese gardens, a water garden with koi, sculpture, a polo field, topiary and an outdoor theater.

The climbing rose trellis from the gardens is now located in the Minot Rose Garden in Winthrop Square, Brookline.

When Isabel Anderson died in 1948, she bequeathed this entire estate to the Town of Brookline, including mansion, land, and a collection of vehicles. Although the mansion became damaged beyond affordable repair and was torn down in 1955, the immense Carriage House and the elegant "Temple of Love" on the shore of the water garden still reflect the charm and magnificence of Weld when the Andersons were alive. Many architectural features of the estate were modeled after historical edifices: monopteros probably modeled after Temple de l'Amour in Versailles, the bridge with broken balustrade, interrupted by flower pots resembles Boboli gardens at Florence. Follie tempietto dome has a central opening oculus like in the Pantheon dome and a rainwater pool impluvium as sundial with vertical brass pole in the center as gnomon and decorated with wall mascaron with water spout as open mouth resembling "Bocca della Verita" from Temple of Hercules Victor.

In March 2009, the Larz Anderson Park won the Nicholas Rhodes Park of the Month Award.

Between March 2021 and August 2022 the concrete lagoon structures (mainly the two bridges and the tempietto) have been rebuilt.

== Auto Museum ==
The Andersons assembled an extraordinary collection of horse-drawn carriage, sleighs and vintage motorcars. In donating these along with the property, Isabel stipulated that these be known as the "Larz Anderson Collection." Fourteen of the original thirty-two vehicles remain in the collection and are still on display as part of the Larz Anderson Auto Museum

Since the grand opening over fifty years ago, the museum has grown into a New England non-profit educational institution with community events, lectures, children's programs, walking tours of the park, and a series of exhibits on the Andersons, motor vehicles, and the automobile's impact on society and culture.

== Putterham School ==
Built 1768 elsewhere in Brookline and moved to Larz Anderson Park in 1966, the Putterham School is now an educational museum displaying books, teaching aids, schoolroom equipment, exhibits related to the move and other articles of historical interest.

From June until October, the school is open from noon until 3 pm on the second and fourth Sundays of each month. Members of the Brookline Historical Society will also open the museum by appointment for school groups and other visitors.

== Gallery ==
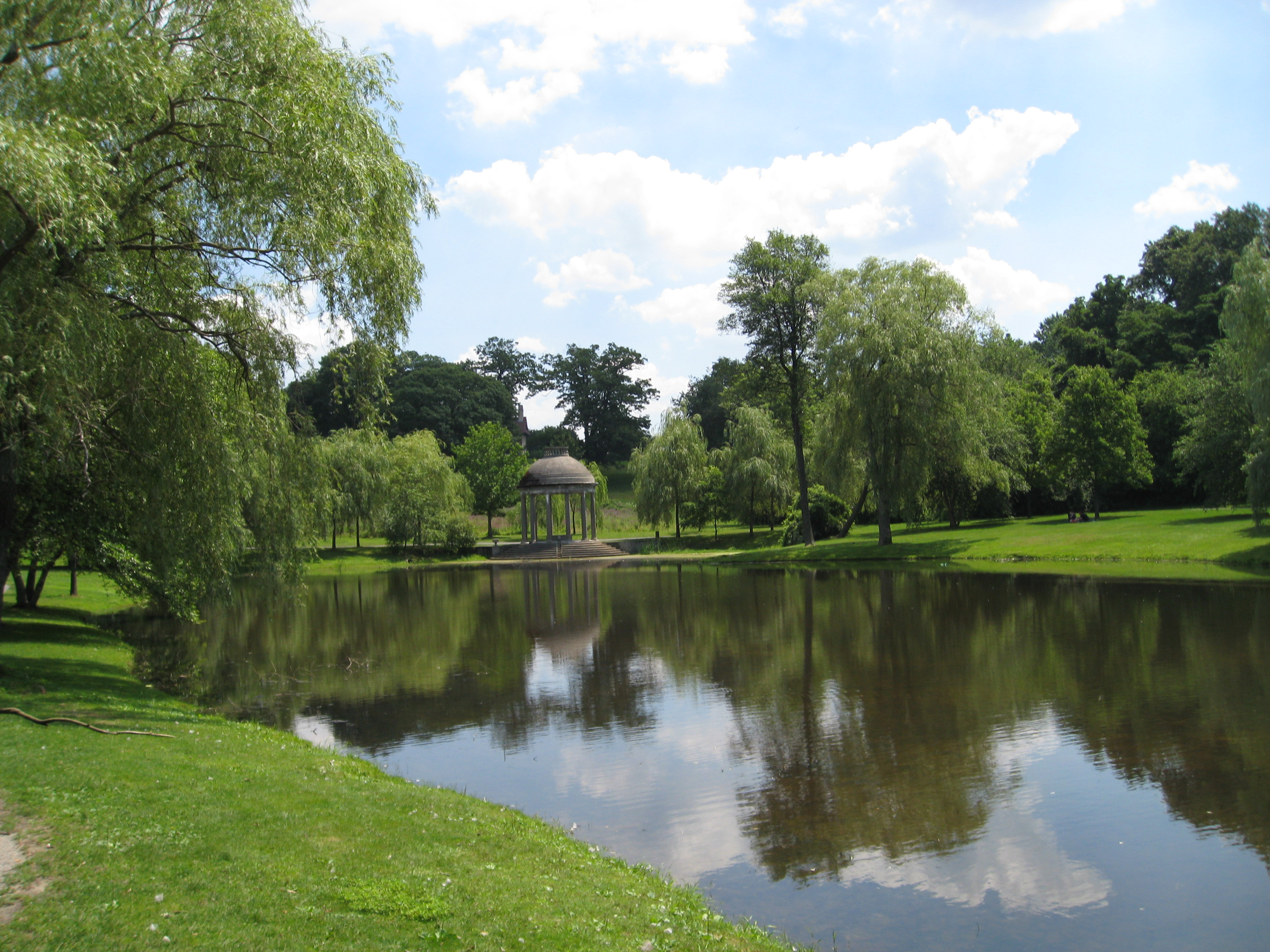
The "Temple of Love"

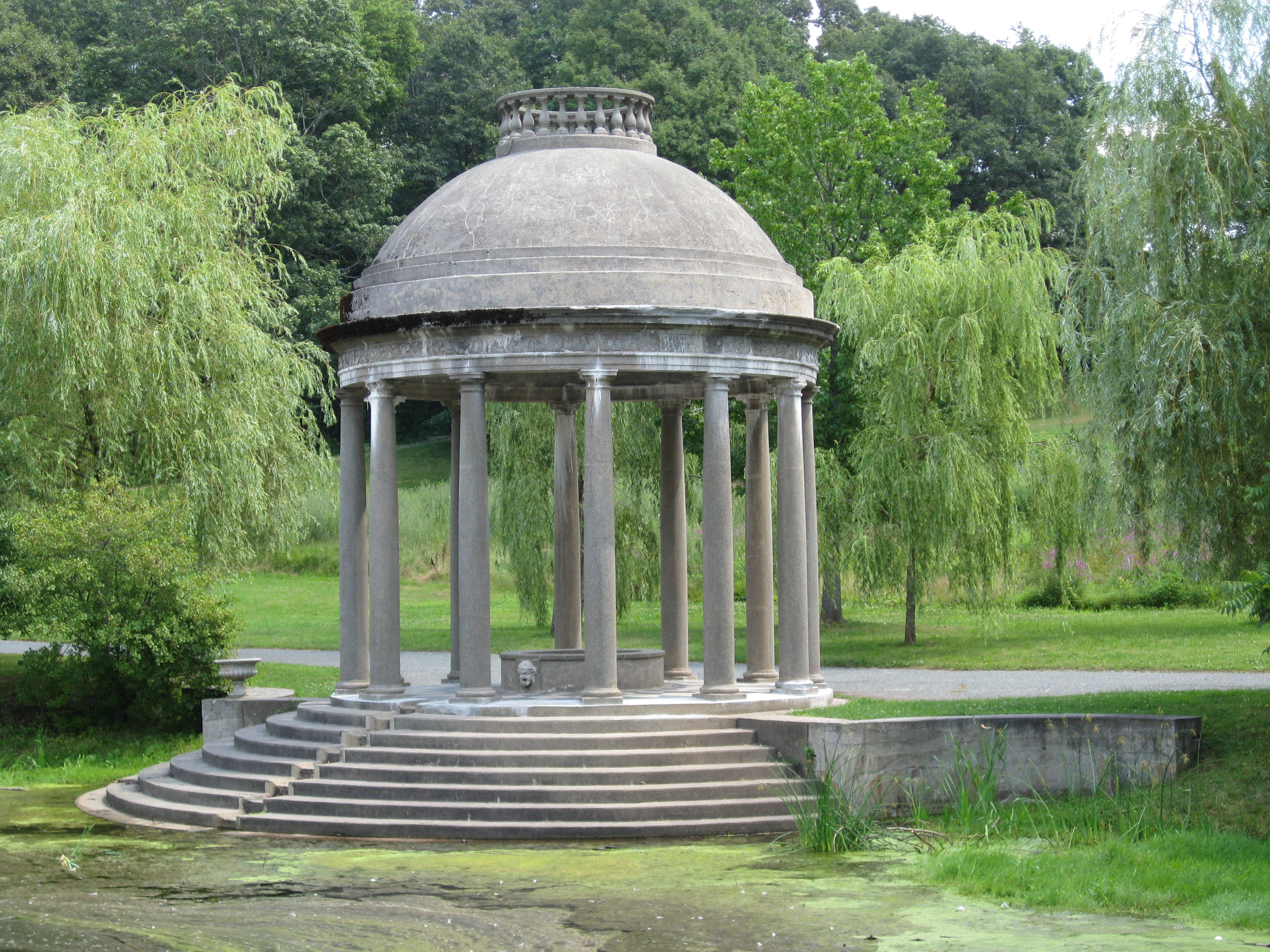
Close-up

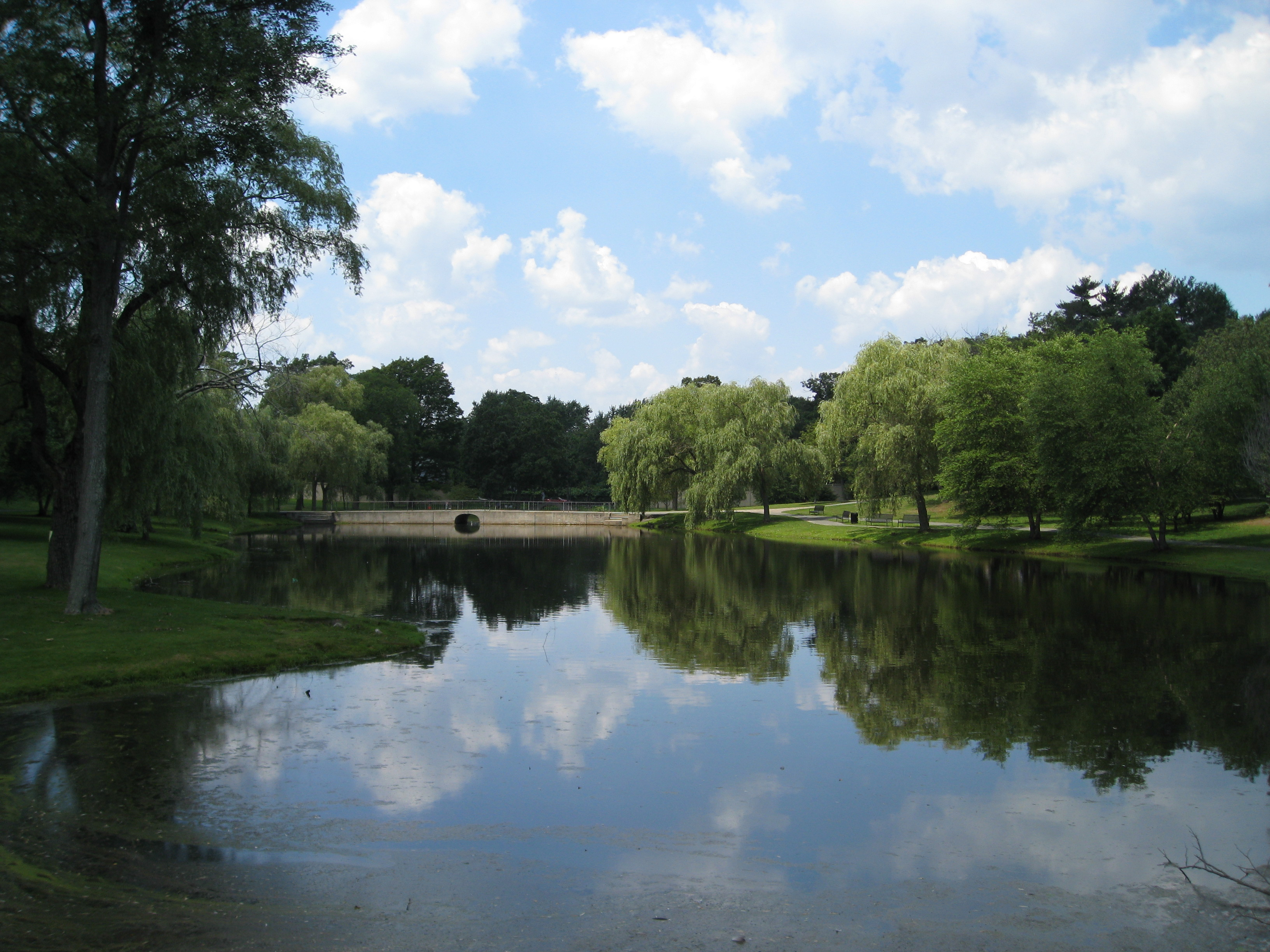
Bridge viewed from temple

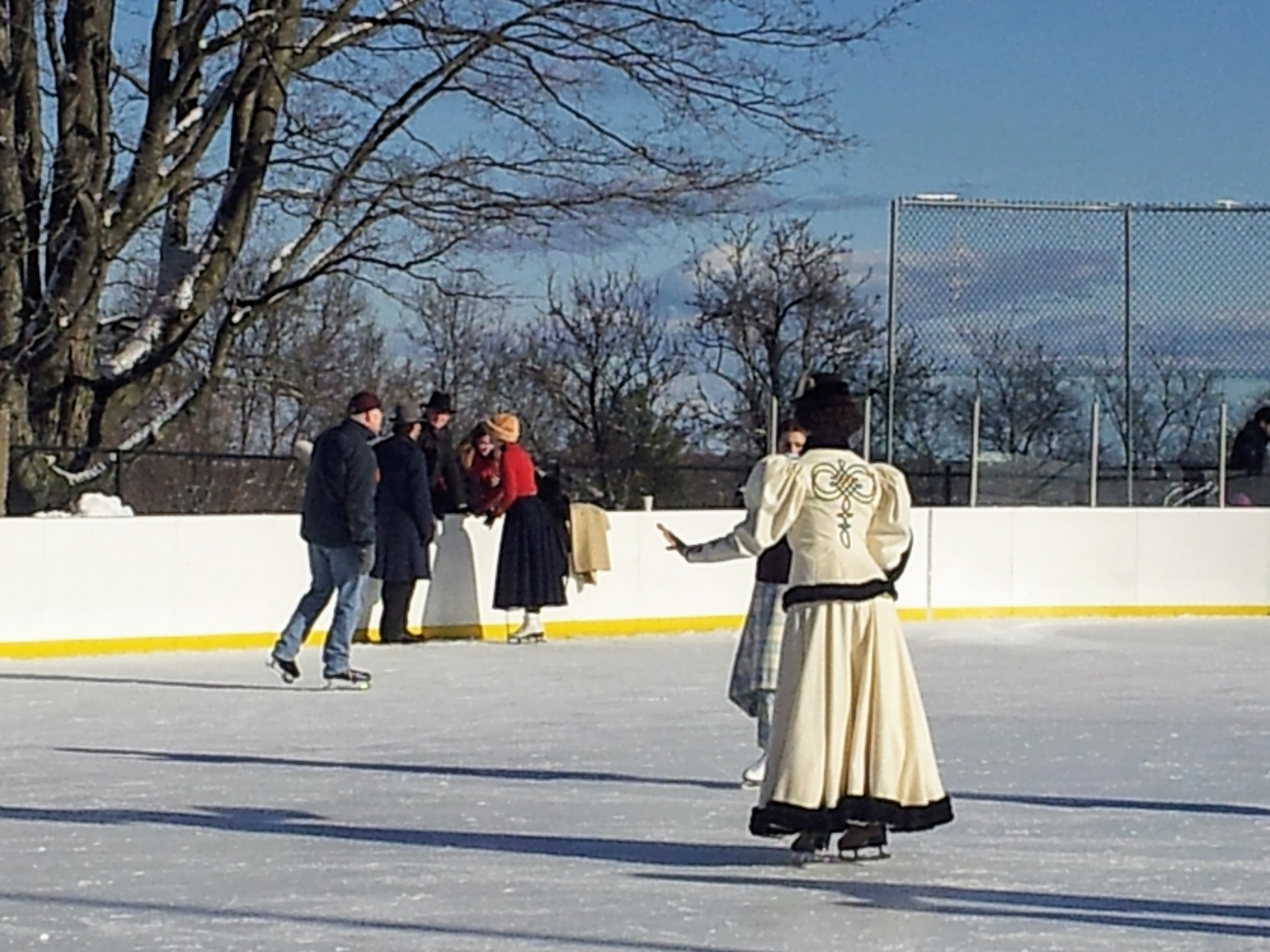

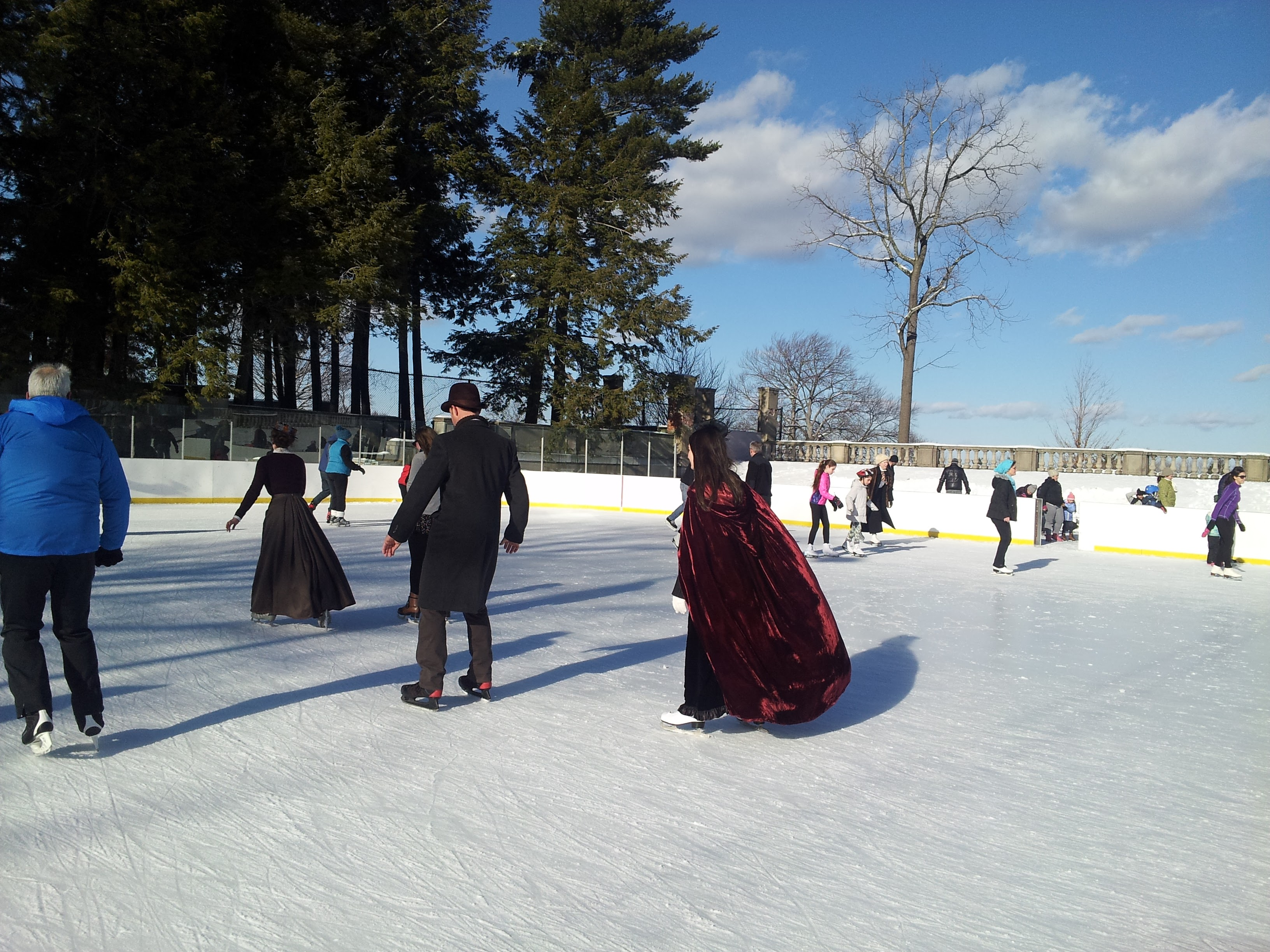
Jack Kirrane Ice Skating Rink

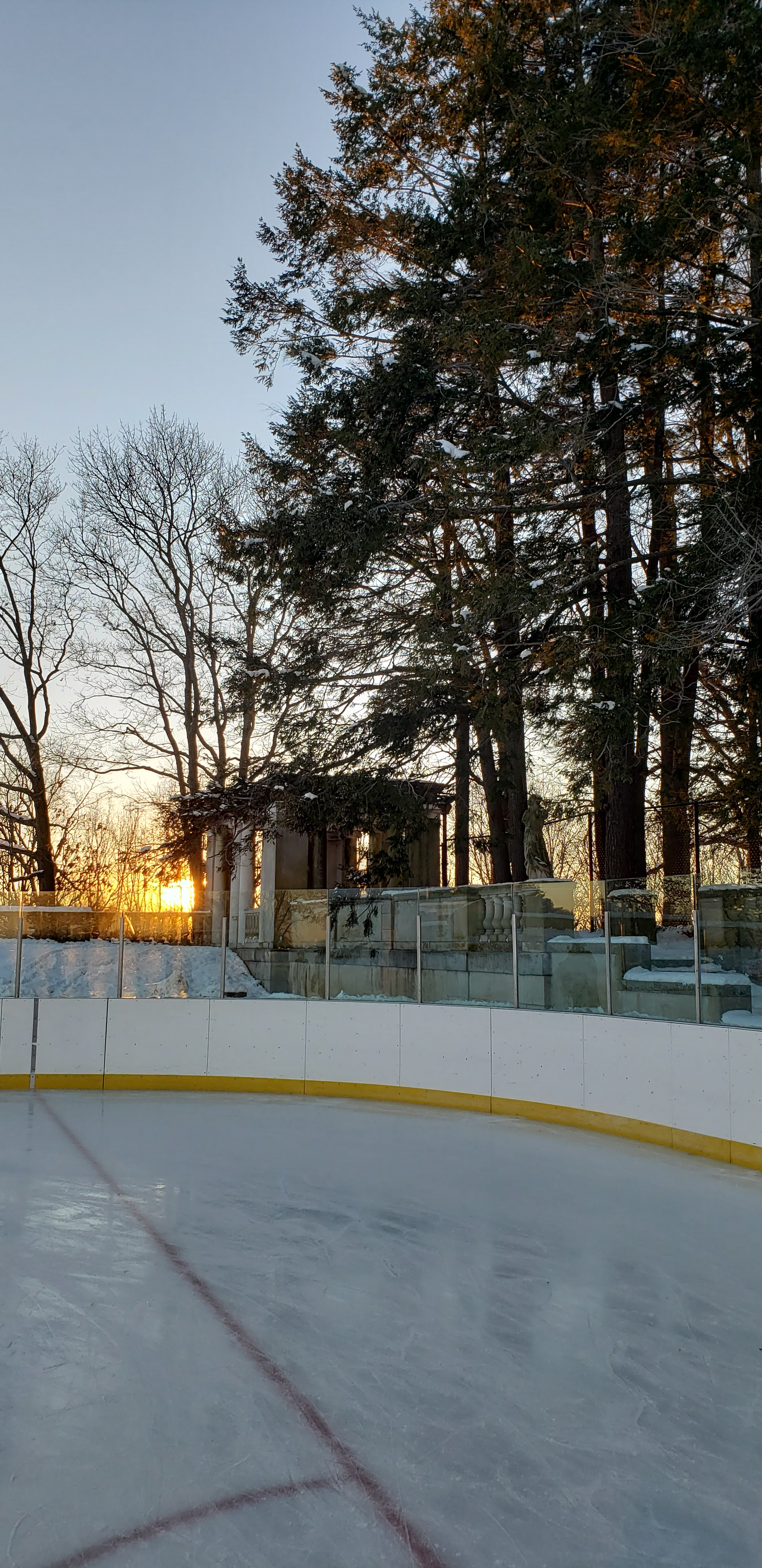

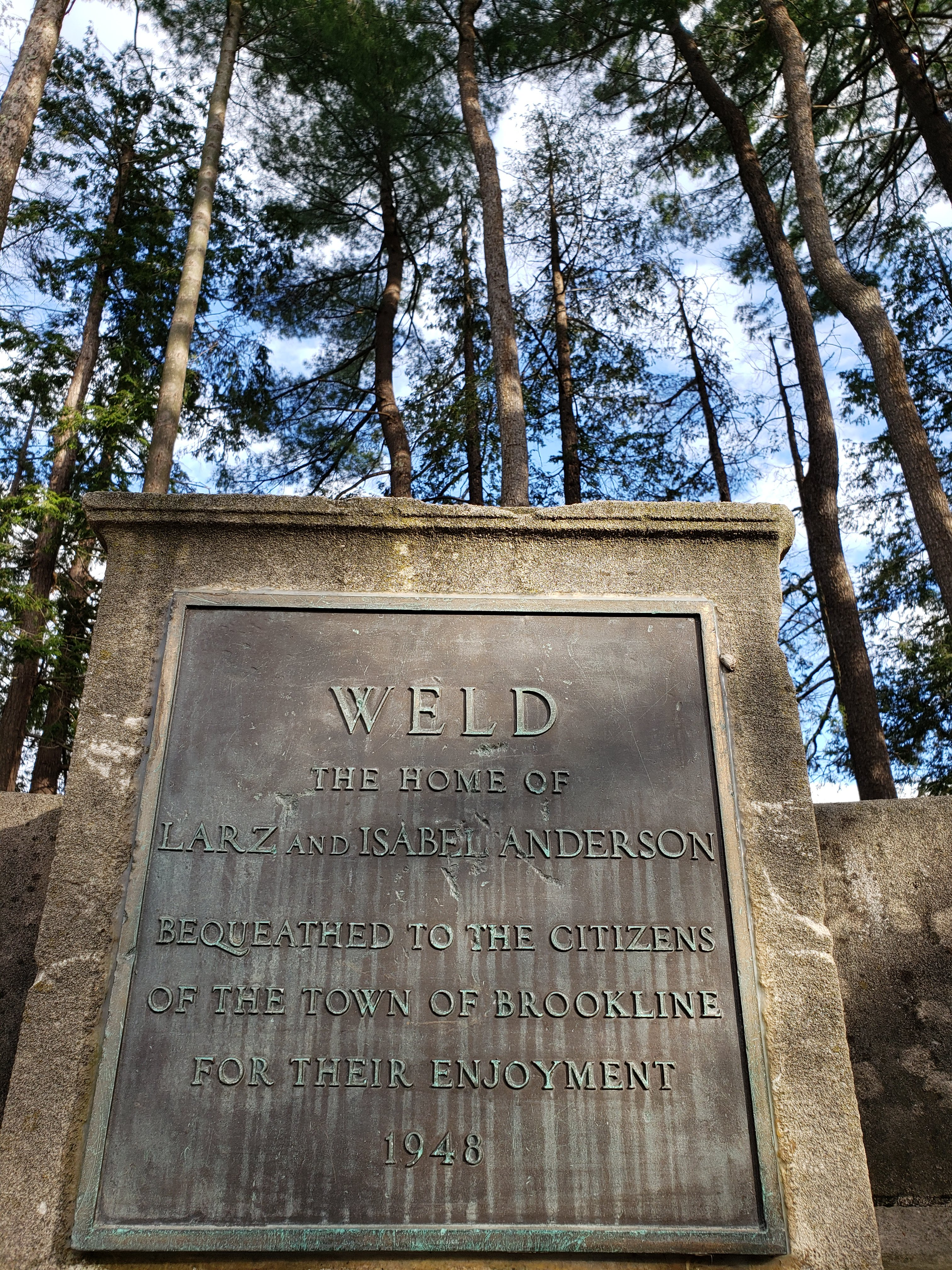
Historic Place plaque "Weld"

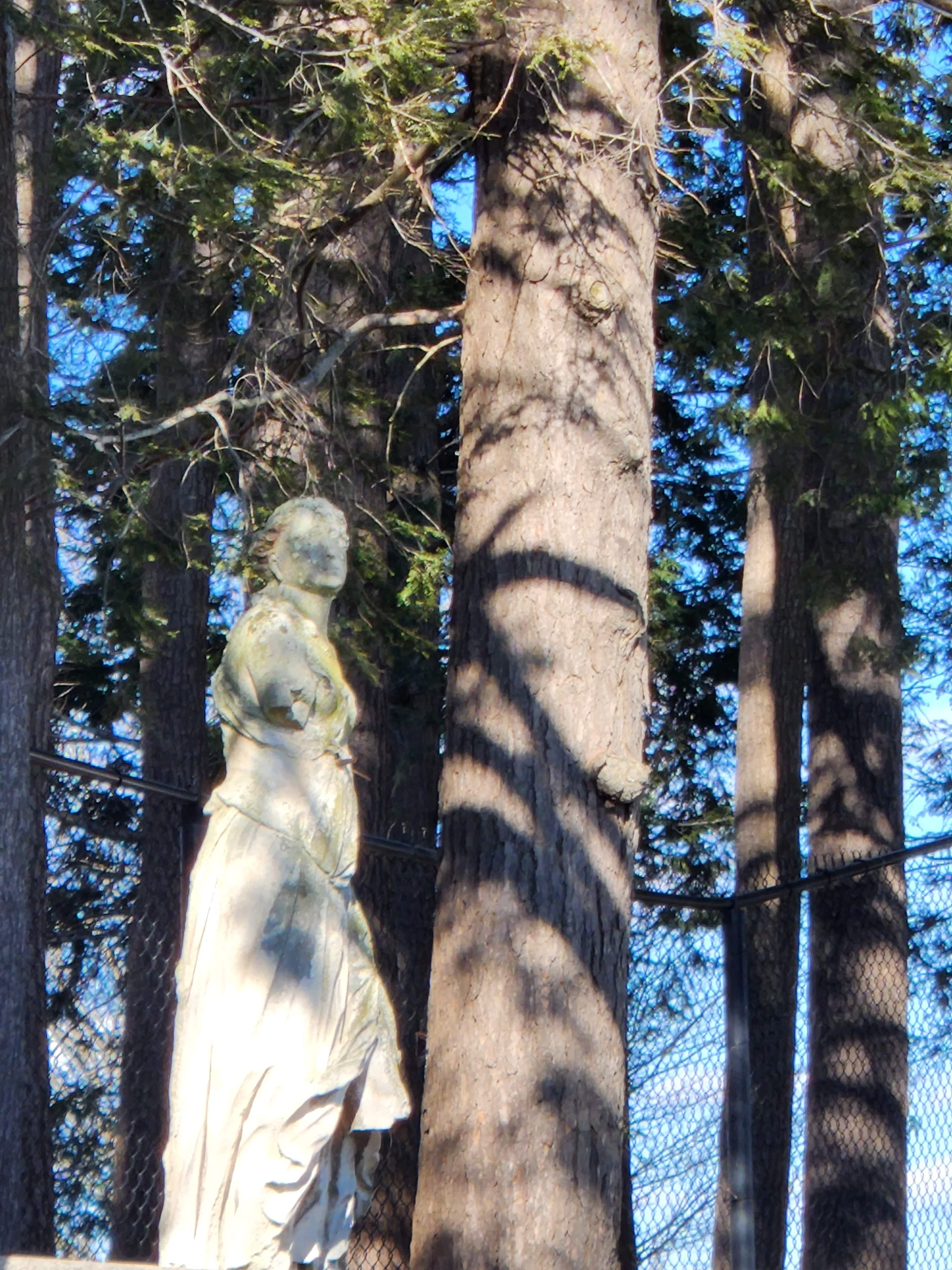
Sculpture from Italian Garden at "Weld"

== See also ==
- National Register of Historic Places listings in southern Boston, Massachusetts
- National Register of Historic Places listings in Brookline, Massachusetts

== Bibliography ==
- Anderson, Larz: Letters and Journals of a Diplomat, New York, 1940.
- Anderson, Isabella Under the Black Horse Flag, Boston, 1926
- Del Tredici, Peter: "Early American Bonsai: The Larz Anderson Collection of the Arnold Arboretum", Arnoldia (Summer 1989)
- Town and Country, March 12, 1904: The Gardens at Weld
