= Lems =

English electric car model

The Lems was an English electric car manufactured by the London Electromobile Syndicate in London from 1903 to 1904. The two-seater runabout claimed to run 40 miles (64 km) on a single charge and reach a top speed of 12 mph (19 km/h). It was sold for 180 guineas.

In the United States, there is an example of this car at Larz Anderson Auto Museum in Brookline, Massachusetts.

== See also ==
- List of car manufacturers of the United Kingdom
