= Landstuhl Elementary School =

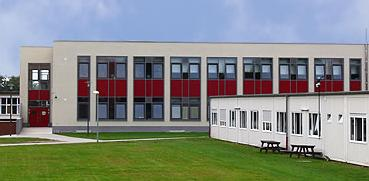
- Landstuhl Regional Medical Center, Germany

Information
- Type: DoDDS Elementary
- Principal: Dr. Mary Bade
- Faculty: Approx. 50
- Grades: K-5
- Colors: Blue and gold
- Mascot: The Lions
- Website: Landstuhl Elementary School

Landstuhl Elementary School (LES) is a PSCD, K-5 school located in Landstuhl, Germany. The school is located in the Rheinland-Pfalz state of Germany, about one hour southwest of Frankfurt.

Many of the students at the school have parents who work at the Landstuhl Regional Medical Center, which is the largest military hospital outside of the continental United States.

In 2020, LES was recognized as a National Blue Ribbon School. With a strong focus on shared leadership, Landstuhl ES has attempted to embody the spirit of "One Team One Dream" and, as a result, performed in the top 5 percent of all DoDEA schools throughout the globe.

== Buildings ==
LES has a total of three buildings, two permanent and one temporary.The main building was originally constructed in 1955 and has been given additions ever since. The most recent of these is a 6½ million dollar addition completed in April 2008. Construction of the new 21st Century school is scheduled for sometime in 2022.

== Accreditation ==
LES is fully accredited by the North Central Association Commission on Accreditation and School Improvement (NCA CASI). Every five years the school is visited by the NCA CASI to assess the success of the school's individual school improvement plan. The professional and auxiliary staff members at school complete an in-depth report which addresses one affective and one cognitive area that the school has chosen to address in an outcomes based school improvement plan. This self-study is submitted to the NCA CASI for their review and evaluation. In addition to the accreditation visits, annual reports are submitted to the NCA CASI, which serves as an update for the original self-study. The process of self-evaluation is continuous.

== Extracurricular activities ==
LES offers a various number of clubs for students to join.

- Technology Club
- Foreign Language Club
- Story Hour
- Brain Bowl
- Student Council
- Military History Club
- Math Counts
- German Study Club
