= Larz Anderson =

American diplomat (1866–1937)

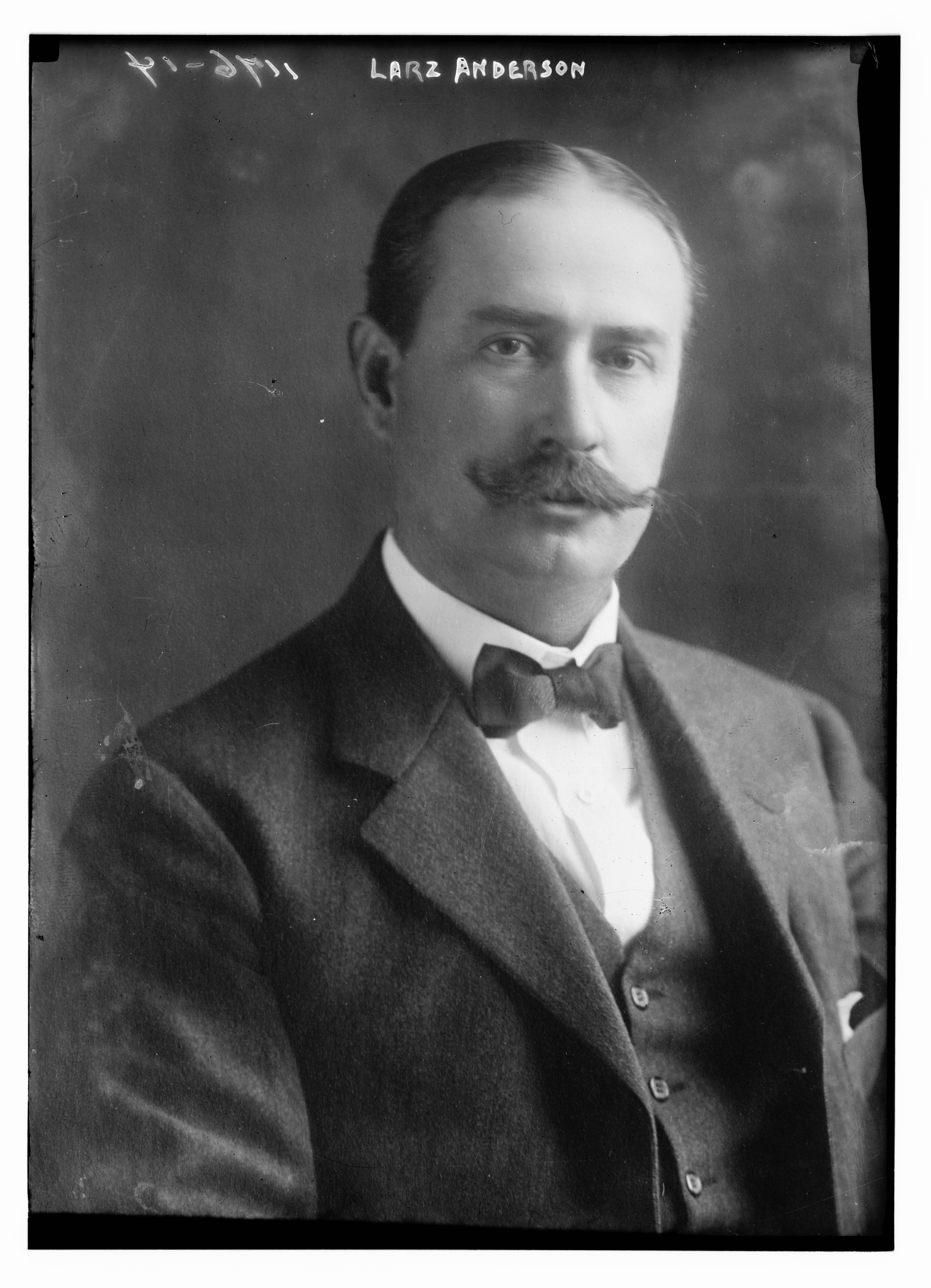
- Born: Larz Kilgour Anderson; August 15, 1866; Paris, France
- Died: April 13, 1937 (aged 70); White Sulphur Springs, West Virginia, United States
- Education: Harvard College (A.B., 1888)
- Occupations: Diplomat; collector; bon vivant
- Known for: Participating in American elite society 1897-1937
- Spouse: Isabel Weld Perkins

Larz Anderson (August 15, 1866 – April 13, 1937) was an American diplomat and bon vivant. He served as second secretary at the United States Legation to the Court of St James's, London; as first secretary and later chargé d'affaires at the United States Embassy in Rome; as United States Minister to Belgium; and then briefly as the Ambassador to Japan. He also unsuccessfully sought appointment as Ambassador to Italy.

== Life ==
=== Early life ===
Anderson was the son of Brevet Major General Nicholas Longworth Anderson and Elizabeth Coles Kilgour Anderson. He was born in Paris on August 15, 1866, while his Cincinnati, Ohio, parents, who had married on March 28, 1865, were on their planned year-long honeymoon, which was extended six months due to the birth of their son. He was the great-grandson of Lieutenant Richard Clough Anderson Sr., who served in the American Revolution. He was also the grandnephew of Brigadier General Robert Anderson, who defended Fort Sumter at the beginning of the American Civil War.

Anderson attended Phillips Exeter Academy in Exeter, New Hampshire, before attending Harvard College. At Harvard, he was a member of the Hasty Pudding Club, the A.D. Club, the Institute of 1770, Alpha Delta Phi, and Delta Kappa Epsilon. After graduating in 1888, Anderson set out on a year-and-a-half grand tour that included his first visit to Japan. When he returned to the U.S., Anderson attended Harvard Law School for two semesters during the 1890–91 academic year.

=== Diplomatic career ===
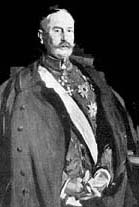
Anderson wears his self-designed, bespoke diplomatic uniform and medals, including the insignia of the Society of the Cincinnati in this 1914 portrait by DeWitt M. Lockman.

In June 1891, after Anderson had dropped out of Harvard Law School, his father interceded with his 1858 Harvard classmate Robert Todd Lincoln, son of President Abraham Lincoln, who was then serving as the U.S. minister to the Court of St. James's in London. Lincoln offered Anderson the job of second secretary of the American legation in London. In 1894, after three years in London, Anderson was appointed first secretary of the American embassy in Rome and then, in 1897, served for several months as chargé d'affaires, until he resigned to return to the U.S. for his wedding to Isabel Weld Perkins. His resignation was at the time controversial, and American newspapers reported on his months-long efforts to be released from his post by the U.S. Department of State.

Anderson returned to the diplomatic corps in 1911 as United States Minister to Belgium, serving from November 18, 1911 until November 15, 1912, when he was appointed Ambassador to Japan. He held this post as a fully accredited and confirmed American ambassador for only one day, March 3, 1913, though he was in Japan from December 28, 1912, until his return to the United States on March 16, 1913. He resigned when the Republican administration of William Howard Taft was replaced by the Democratic administration of Woodrow Wilson. The exact reasons for his resignation and departure from Japan are not clear. One American newspaper reported that he left his Tokyo post "because the Japanese government had declined to receive him."

When Anderson was appointed Minister to Belgium, he had an elaborate diplomatic uniform made for himself in London by the firm of Davies & Son, tailors to British royalty. Though he was famously photographed and painted wearing it, he never wore the elaborate, custom-made quasi-military uniform in public, once writing in his journal that the "Diplomatic uniform is in the dress of a minister of the 'first-class' (which I am) and is the one which I do not wear." Some have claimed based on the photograph that Anderson's uniform was one of the few worn by an American diplomat since the early 1800s, but a public law dating to 1867 prohibited diplomats from wearing any uniform not approved by Congress, and Anderson observed that law. In 1937, President Franklin Roosevelt proscribed American diplomats from wearing any uniform. Anderson's uniform is on display at Larz Anderson House.

Though it has often been said that he "retired from the diplomatic corps" after leaving Japan, he remained open to another assignment. In 1923 he actively though unsuccessfully sought nomination as U.S. Ambassador to Rome under President Calvin Coolidge. He later recalled that he was "the first American to rise all the way through the diplomatic ranks from the lowest position to the highest." Anderson and his wife, Isabel, spent the next twenty-five years traveling extensively at home and abroad; collecting memorabilia and decorative arts; expanding the mansion and gardens of their summer home "Weld" in Brookline, Massachusetts, now the Larz Anderson Park; funding the construction of the Anderson Memorial Bridge across the Charles River in Boston and Cambridge, Massachusetts; and funding the construction and interior decoration of the Lady Chapel of the Washington National Cathedral.

According to sources cited by his biographer, Anderson's diplomatic record was an embarrassment to President William Howard Taft; the Senate Foreign Relations Committee refused to confirm him as United States Ambassador to Japan in 1913 even after he had assumed his post there. Richard W. Leopold, reviewing a volume of Anderson's letters, wrote that they contained "little of value":

Comments on those vital economic, social, and intellectual forces that shape foreign policy are wholly absent. Anderson seems to have been blissfully unaware of or unconcerned with the factors making for Anglo-American friendship in the early [eighteen]-nineties. His diaries shed no new light on Italian-American relations during the same decade. Although he was at Brussels just before the World War and at Tokyo in a critical moment in Far Eastern affairs, Anderson recorded nothing of importance. Instead, his pages are devoted solely to royal receptions, embassy parties, and other trivialities that are merely the trappings of diplomatic life.

George E. Mowry wrote that Anderson "never allowed his official duties to interfere with his lengthy and verbose unofficial reporting of society's meaningless activities ... If the selections published are a true sample of the bulk of the writings that Mr. Anderson chose to preserve for posterity, they say little for the author and as little for the government that hired him for responsible positions."

=== Military service ===
In 1898, he registered to serve with the U.S. Volunteers during the Spanish–American War. He was commissioned May 12 as a captain and served for four months as an assistant adjutant general at Camp Alger in northern Virginia. He later received the Spanish War Service Medal, awarded to all who served on active duty in the United States Army anytime between 20 April 1898 and 11 April 1899 who were not deployed to a combat zone. During his service, he rode a famous horse, "Soldier Boy," that had once been owned by Buffalo Bill Cody, and was immortalized by Mark Twain in his novel "A Horse's Tail." Twain called Soldier Boy "a wonder of a horse" with "a reputation which is as shining as his own silken hide."

=== Marriage to Isabel Weld Perkins ===
In 1896, while serving as First Secretary at the United States Embassy in Rome, Italy, Anderson met Isabel Weld Perkins, a young debutante from Boston who was then on her grand tour of Europe, Egypt, and the Holy Land. Their mutual friend Maud Howe Elliott introduced them to each other on the roof of her home, the Villa Rusticucci in Rome. Both Larz and Isabel's families established themselves in America before the American Revolution. The Anderson family had arrived in Jamestown 1634; and the Welds in the Massachusetts Bay Colony in 1632. The Anderson family's wealth was primarily in land and real estate holdings in the midwest, but their resources did not compare to those of the Weld Family.

In 1881, when Isabel was five years old, she inherited slightly more than 5 million dollars from her grandfather, William Fletcher Weld. Her inheritance was held in a trust for her until her twenty-fifth birthday.

Larz and Isabel were married at Arlington Street Church in Boston on June 10, 1897, and they embarked on a life of luxury combined with public service and adventure. They traveled widely across the world as well as through North America, visiting five continents and becoming among the first Westerners to visit countries such as Tibet and Nepal. No children were born to the marriage. Isabel authored several books, including a history of the Weld shipping enterprise, Under the Black Horse Flag.

=== Memberships ===
Anderson was admitted to the Maryland Society of the Cincinnati in 1894, following the death of his father. He was eligible for membership in the Society of the Cincinnati by virtue of being the great grandson of Lieutenant Colonel Richard Clough Anderson of Virginia, one of the founding members of the organization. Normally, members of the Society join the Society of the state from which their ancestor served. In Anderson's case, the Virginia Society was inactive and 1894 and would not be revived until 1896.

Anderson was a loyal member of the Society and had various motifs based on the Society's insignia incorporated into the decoration of their Washington mansion, Anderson House, along with those of other organizations he was connected with. After his death, Isabel Anderson donated Anderson House to the Society. It now serves as its international headquarters.

By right of his father's service in the Union Army, Anderson was elected as a Hereditary Companion of the Massachusetts Commandery of the Loyal Legion on February 1, 1903. He was assigned insignia number 9997.

He was also a member of several other hereditary and patriotic organizations, including the Sons of the Revolution and the Naval and Military Order of the Spanish War.

Because of his diplomatic service, Anderson was invested with the Order of Saints Maurice and Lazarus (Italy), the Order of the Crown (Italy), the Order of the Rising Sun (Japan), and the Order of the Crown (Belgium).

Anderson's religious affiliation was Episcopalian.

=== Death ===
Anderson died in White Sulphur Springs, West Virginia, and was interred at Washington National Cathedral, where his remains rest in the St. Mary Chapel with those of his wife. The Andersons had no children.

== Racism and antisemitism ==
Anderson's diaries and journals often expressed virulent racism and anti-Semitism. During a 1907 vacation in Florida aboard his houseboat, he wrote:

Some darkey singers I had engaged to sing my Isabel to sleep simply failed to materialize (one white citizen who was standing gazing at us, to whom I spoke of my disappointment at their failure, said the only way to get a nigger to do anything was to get the police to 'ask' him to do it) – so I'll ask police aid the next time I want a concert.

Visiting Prague in 1906, Anderson wrote of "narrow, winding, dirty, smelly streets with hooknosed Jews peering out of cellar doors." He also blamed a string of Harvard football losses on the fact that coach Arnold Horween was Jewish.

== Homes and collections ==
Larz and Isabel Anderson on the garden terrace of their Washington, D.C., home

Anderson Memorial Bridge, connecting Boston and Cambridge, Massachusetts, is often called "Larz Anderson Bridge"; in fact it was built by Anderson in memory of his father Nicholas Longworth Anderson.

=== Anderson House ===
Between 1902 and 1905, the Andersons built a Beaux Arts mansion in the fashionable Dupont Circle neighborhood of Washington, D.C. Known as Anderson House, the mansion was the couple's winter residence during the Washington social season, which generally extended from New Year's Day through Easter. After Larz's death, Isabel Anderson donated Anderson House in 1938 to the Society of the Cincinnati, of which Anderson was a member, and it now serves as its national headquarters.

=== New Hampshire ===
After her father's death Isabel Anderson purchased her father's birthplace in Contoocook, New Hampshire, a village of Hopkinton. She occasionally stayed in the house, but preferred her own small, rustic summer camp in a rural area of southern New Hampshire that she used as a writing retreat and for visits with her relatives. The Perkins house has since been sold and divided into eight apartments and is now known as Perkins Manor.

=== Weld ===
In 1898, the Andersons came into the possession of 64 acres (26 hectares) near the outskirts of Boston that had been in Isabel's family since the mid-19th century. Isabel named the property Weld in honor of her grandfather William Fletcher Weld and the estate became the Andersons' home for summers and Christmas holidays for the next forty years. At the time they acquired the property, it included a shingle-style summer home that had been built in 1881 by Boston architect Edmund M. Wheelwright for Isabel's cousin William Fletcher Weld II.

The Andersons added gardens, landscaping, a large kitchen garden including a greenhouse and outbuildings, a tennis court, and a small pond to the estate. Over time, the couple acquired an additional 7 acres (2.8 ha) of adjacent land, where Larz built three smaller mansions that were used as guest housing and storage. In 1914-16, after his return from diplomatic service abroad, Larz engaged the firm of Little & Browne to more than double the size of the mansion. Larz directed that architectural design elements from Lulworth Castle, an ancestral home associated with the Roman Catholic branch of the Weld family, be incorporated into the structure. Isabel willed the estate, including all land and buildings, to the Town of Brookline after her death in 1948 and it is now Larz Anderson Park.

=== Auto Collection ===
The Andersons had assembled an extraordinary collection of horse-drawn carriages, sleighs and vintage motorcars. In donating these along with the property, Isabel Anderson stipulated in her will that these be known as the "Larz Anderson Collection." Fourteen of the original thirty-two vehicles remain in the collection and are still on display as part of the Larz Anderson Auto Museum, the oldest collection of motorcars in the United States. The collection is housed in the stable of the Weld Estate in Brookline, Massachusetts.

=== Bonsai Collection ===
After Larz's death, Isabel donated 30 of their bonsai to the Arnold Arboretum of Harvard University, along with the funds necessary to build a shade house for their display. Following her death, the remaining nine plants were donated to the arboretum, including an 80-year-old hinoki cypress that had been given to the Andersons by the Imperial Household shortly before they left Japan for the last time.

=== The BC Eagle ===
During the time they were in Tokyo, Japan, the garden of the American Embassy was adorned with a gilded bronze eagle sculpture which stood in front of the structure. The Andersons brought the eagle back to the United States and it remained on their Brookline property until 1954, when it was donated to Boston College and installed on the lawn in front of the university's Alumni House before being relocated to a place of prominence on Linden Lane, in front of the university's iconic Gasson Tower. It is now considered synonymous with the "BC Eagle", the university's mascot.

== Bibliography ==
- Isabel Anderson, ed., Larz Anderson: Letters and Journals of a Diplomat (New York: Fleming H. Revell, 1940).
- Isabel Anderson, Under the Black Horse Flag (Boston: Houghton Mifflin, 1926).
- Larz Anderson, “Since Thirty Years.” In: America to Japan: A Symposium of Papers by Representative Citizens of the United States on the Relations between Japan and America and on the Common Interests of the Two Countries, edited by Lindsay Russell (New York: G. P. Putnam's Sons, 1915): 76-80.
- Peter Del Tredici: "Early American Bonsai: The Larz Anderson Collection of the Arnold Arboretum", Arnoldia (Summer 1989).
- Stephen T. Moskey, Larz and Isabel Anderson: Wealth and Celebrity in the Gilded Age (Bloomington, IN: iUniverse, 2016) ISBN 978-1-4917-8874-5 OCLC 946482599.
