= Isabel Weld Perkins =

American heiress, author and society hostess (1876–1948)

Isabel Anderson
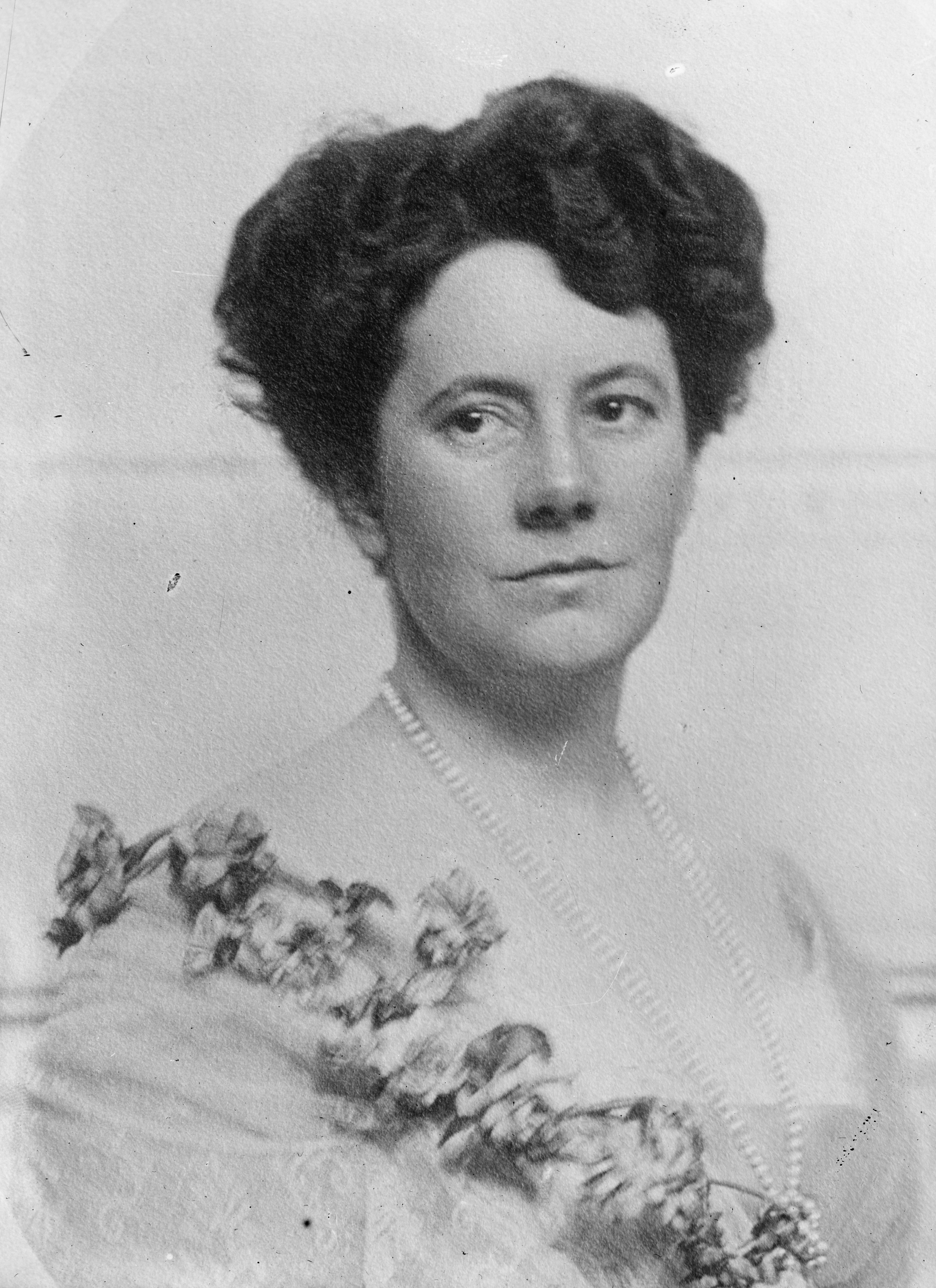
- Born: Isabel Weld Perkins; 29 March 1876; Boston, Massachusetts
- Died: 3 November 1948 (aged 72); Boston, Massachusetts
- Other name: Mrs. Larz Anderson
- Occupations: Writer (novels, plays, poetry, travel, history)
- Known for: Author, war volunteer, society hostess
- Spouse: Larz Anderson

Isabel Anderson (born Isabel Weld Perkins; March 29, 1876 – November 3, 1948) was a Boston heiress, author, and society hostess who left a legacy to the public that includes a park and two museums.

== Life ==
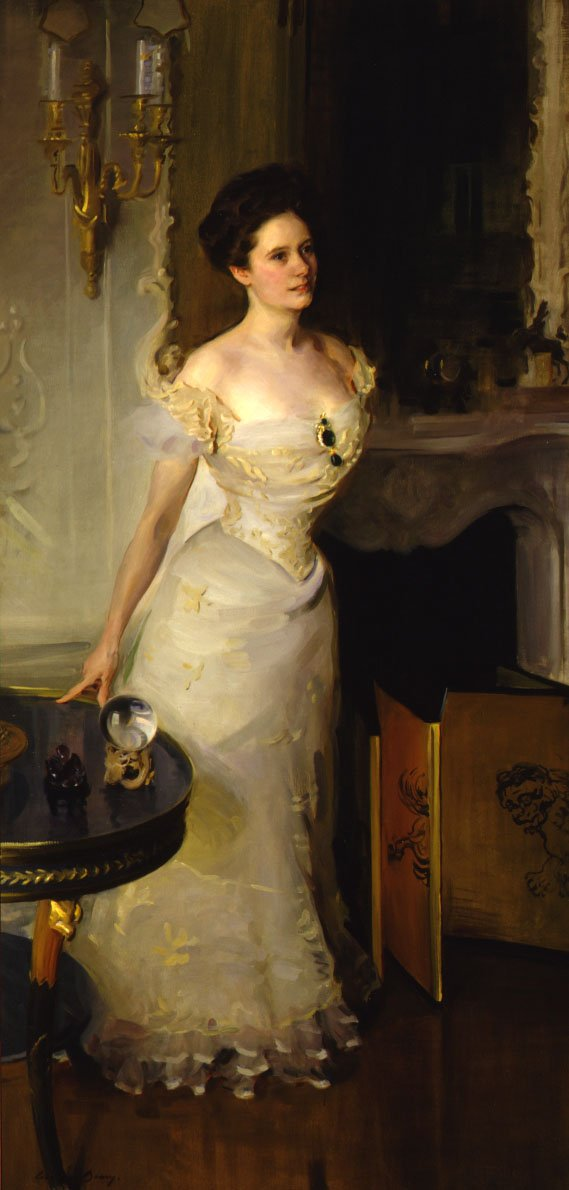
Mrs Larz Anderson, 1901, by Cecilia Beaux

=== Early life ===
Born at 284 Marlborough Street in Boston's Back Bay, Isabel Weld Perkins was descended, on her mother Anna Weld Perkins' side, from a wealthy family of Boston merchants who traced their history back to Massachusetts Bay Colony. Isabel's father was Commodore George H. Perkins of Contoocook, New Hampshire, who was the commander of the USS Cayuga during the American Civil War. The commodore's father, Judge Hamilton Eliot Perkins, was a prosperous businessman and attorney who built mills in Contoocook and for a short time ran a shipping firm in Boston that sailed clipper ships between the U.S. and West Africa.

In 1881, when Isabel was only five years old, she inherited approximately $3 million from her grandfather William Fletcher Weld, though this amount later increased to about $5 million after the Weld estate was probated. For more than a century, it was assumed that she had inherited $17 million from her grandfather, though that amount has been proven incorrect. The first erroneous report of the $17 million figure appeared when the Boston Globe ran a front page story on the Isabel's marriage to Larz Anderson in 1897. The historical record, however, shows the $17 million to have actually been the final value of William Fletcher Weld's $20 million estate, after other bequests and estate taxes were deducted, leaving a residual $17 million that was shared equally among Isabel and Grandfather Weld's three other grandchildren, William Fletcher Weld II, Charles Goddard Weld and Mary Bryant Weld.

Isabel Perkins started traveling at a young age. She spent summers as a child at the Weld homes in Newport and winters with her parents in Boston. Spring and fall she spent at the Perkin's estate in New Hampshire. At the age of nineteen, Isabel took a year long trip to Europe with her chaperone Maud Howe Elliot. It was in Rome where Isabel met her future husband Larz Anderson and married after two years.

=== Marriage to Larz Anderson ===
The Andersons

Larz and Isabel married at the Arlington Street Church in Boston on June 10, 1897. The Andersons then embarked on a life of luxury combined with public service and adventure. They traveled widely, making four trips around the world and throughout Europe and Asia. Anderson held a number of diplomatic posts, including a short stint as United States Ambassador to Japan.

A writer for the Boston Globe sums up Isabel and her marriage by saying:

...these Andersons? They were idle rich, born to money and accustomed to privilege -- but they were interesting people who left us something...Isabel did what rich young women did back then -- she "came out," summered in Newport, "springed" in New Hampshire, wintered in Boston, partied aplenty. In 1896, the debutante went to Europe, a young attractive woman with a considerable inherited fortune. She met Larz; he was smitten; they were married. He did the diplomat thing; she wrote books and plays. They split their time between Washington, D.C., and Brookline.

=== Work as an author ===
Isabel wrote a number of books; those that concern her family specifically are those of the most interest to historians. She also wrote several travelogues, volumes of poetry, and many children's stories.

Her book Under the Black horse flag: Annals of the Weld family and some of its branches describes the transportation empire begun by her great-grandfather William Gordon Weld and details his descendants up to the time of writing.

She also edited the papers of her American Civil War hero father-in-law and published them as The letters and journals of General Nicholas Longworth Anderson; Harvard, civil war, Washington, 1854–1892.

Among her other works are Circling Africa, On the Move, The Spell of Japan, The Spell of Belgium, The Spell of the Hawaiian Islands and the Philippines, Topsy Turvy and the Gold Star, Yacht in Mediterranean Seas and Zigzagging the South Seas. Most of her own personal papers are part of the collection kept at Larz Anderson Auto Museum. Others are stored at New England Historic Genealogical Society.

=== Service in World War I ===
During World War I, Isabel worked for the American Red Cross as a volunteer of the District of Columbia Refreshment Corps. She was a leader of Washington's Red Cross activities and Belgian relief work, then spent eight months in 1917 and 1918 caring for the war's sick and wounded in France and Belgium. Isabel returned to Washington to find Americans suffering from an influenza epidemic and volunteered to assist those in need. Her contributions as a nurse resulted in being awarded the American Red Cross Service Medal, the French Croix de Guerre with bronze star, and the Medal of Elisabeth of Belgium.

=== Perkins Manor ===
In addition to her Weld inheritance from her mother's family, Isabel inherited a stately manor in New Hampshire from her commodore father. Larz and Isabel spent considerable time here and she even opened the doors of this regal mansion to the public for a few summers. This stately manor was called the Larz Anderson estate during this time but has since been divided into eight apartments and is again known as Perkins Manor.

=== Memberships and honors ===
Like her husband, Isabel was active in patriotic and hereditary societies including the Daughters of the American Revolution and The National Society of the Colonial Dames of America.

In 1930, she received an honorary Doctor of Laws degree from Boston University.

=== Death ===
Isabel died in 1948. Her ashes are interred in the Anderson Tomb in the St. Mary Chapel of the Washington National Cathedral with her husband Larz Anderson.

== Estates and collections ==
=== Anderson House ===
Weld money funded a luxurious mansion at Dupont Circle in Washington, D.C. The Andersons used this as their winter residence from approximately New Years through the beginning of Lent, except when they were traveling abroad or aboard their private steam yacht, The Roxana. After Larz died, Isabel gave the property to the Society of the Cincinnati, of which Anderson was a member. Anderson House now serves as the society's national headquarters and a museum.

=== Anderson Memorial Bridge ===
Isabel Anderson's money also built a bridge across the Charles River connecting Boston and Cambridge, Massachusetts. The project was undertaken by Larz Anderson in honor of his father, Nicholas Longworth Anderson, Harvard Class of 1858. The bridge stands next to Weld Boathouse, a local landmark named after and paid for by her uncle, George Walker Weld.

=== Weld Estate ===
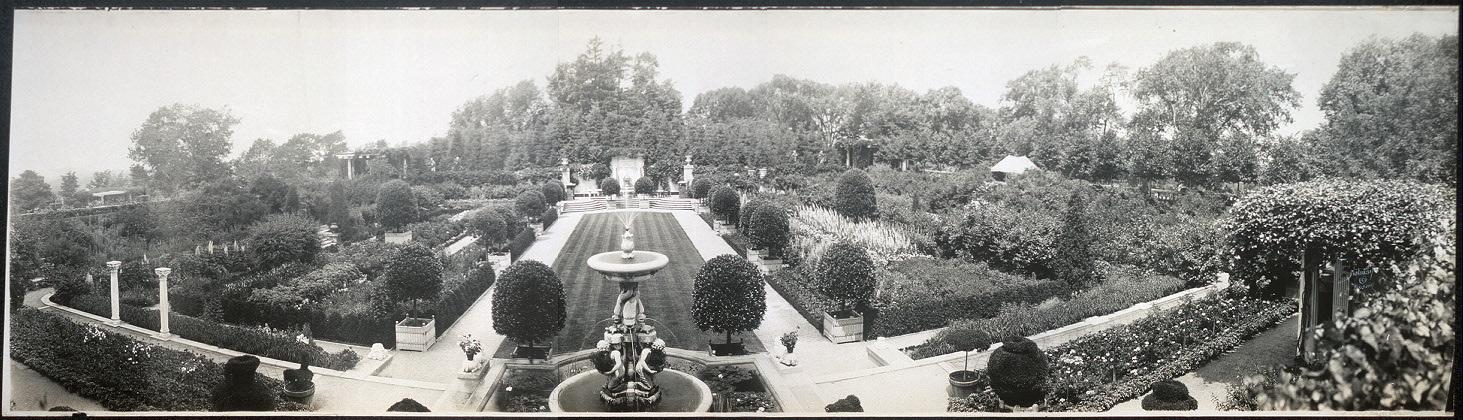
A view of the gardens of Weld, Brookline, 1911

Isabel purchased 64 acres (260,000 square meters) in Brookline, Massachusetts, from her 1st cousin. To this estate, which had been in Isabel's family for generations, the Andersons added a twenty-five room mansion that they used for summers and Christmas holidays. The mansion, overlooking the Boston skyline, was remodeled to resemble Lulworth Castle, an ancestral home associated with the Welds. They named the place "Weld" in honor of Isabel's grandfather. Isabel willed this property to the Town of Brookline and it is now Larz Anderson Park.

=== Auto collection ===
Shortly after they wed, the Andersons began assembling an extraordinary collection of horse-drawn carriages, sleighs and motorcars. In donating these along with the property, Isabel Anderson stipulated in her will that these be known as the "Larz Anderson Collection." Fourteen of the original thirty-two vehicles remain in the collection and are still on display as part of the Larz Anderson Auto Museum, the oldest collection of motorcars in the United States.

=== Bonsai collection ===
After Larz's death, Isabel donated 30 of their bonsai to the Arnold Arboretum of Harvard University along with the funds necessary to build a shade house for their display. Following her death, the remaining nine trees were donated to the Arboretum including an 80-year-old hinoki cypress that had been given to the Andersons by the Emperor of Japan.

=== The BC Eagle ===
The Andersons' residence in Tokyo was adorned with a gilded bronze eagle sculpture which stood in front of their home. The Andersons brought the eagle back to the United States and it remained on their Brookline property after their death.

In 1954, the gilded sculpture was donated to Boston College and is now considered synonymous with the "BC Eagle", the university's mascot.

== Bibliography ==
- Anderson, Larz: Letters and Journals of a Diplomat, New York, 1940.
- Anderson, Isabel: Under the Black Horse Flag, Boston, 1926
- Del Tredici, Peter: "Early American Bonsai: The Larz Anderson Collection of the Arnold Arboretum", Arnoldia (Summer 1989)
- Moskey, Stephen T: "Larz and Isabel Anderson: Wealth and Celebrity in the Gilded Age," (iUniverse 2016). ISBN 978-1-4917-8874-5 OCLC 946482599

== Sources ==
- Arnold Arboretum of Harvard University, Larz Anderson and Isabel Weld Perkins
- Harvard Magazine, "The Welds of Harvard Yard" by associate editor Craig A. Lambert
- Historic Houses In Dorset, "Lulworth Castle"
- Jamaica Plain Historical Society, "The Weld Family"
- "Self-Guided Walking Tour of Weld at Larz Anderson Park"
- Larz Anderson Auto Museum, "The Andersons"
- Project Gutenberg, Book of Annals and Reminiscences of Jamaica Plain by Harriet Manning Whitcomb
- Works by Isabel Anderson at Project Gutenberg
- Works by or about Isabel Anderson at the Internet Archive
- Works by Isabel Weld Perkins at LibriVox (public domain audiobooks)
