= Military Order of the Loyal Legion of the United States =

American patriotic order

The Loyal Legion – U.S. Marine Band

The Military Order of the Loyal Legion of the United States (MOLLUS), or, simply, the Loyal Legion, is a United States military order organized on April 15, 1865, by three veteran officers of the Union Army. The original membership was consisted of commissioned officers of the Regular or Volunteer Army, U.S. Navy, U.S. Marine Corps, or the U.S. Revenue Cutter Service who served during the American Civil War or who had served and thereafter been commissioned and who thereby had aided in maintaining the honor, integrity, and supremacy of the national movement" during the Civil War.

The Loyal Legion was formed in response to rumors from Washington D.C. of a conspiracy to incapacitate the United States government by the assassination of its leaders in the immediate aftermath of the assassination of President Abraham Lincoln. The founding members stated their purpose as cherishing the memories and associations of the war waged in defense of the unity and indivisibility of the Republic; the strengthening of the ties of fraternal fellowship and sympathy formed by companionship in arms; the relief of the widows and children of dead companions of the order; and the advancement of the general welfare of the soldiers and sailors of the United States. The veterans' organization became a hereditary society after the original officers died off. The modern organization is composed of men who are direct descendants, nephews, or first cousins of these officers (hereditary members), and also other men who share the ideals of the Order (Associate members), who collectively are considered "Companions". A female auxiliary, Dames of the Loyal Legion of the United States (DOLLUS), was formed in 1899 and accepted as an affiliate in 1915. Of the 258 hereditary societies that qualify for a listing with the Hereditary Society Community of the United States of America, the Loyal Legion ranks 25th in terms of insignia precedence.

== Origins ==
Following the assassination of President Abraham Lincoln on April 14, 1865, rumors spread that the act had been part of a broader conspiracy to overthrow the legally constituted government of the United States by assassinating its chief men. Many people at first gave credence to these rumors, including three of the officers assigned to the honor guard for Lincoln's body as it was transported to Springfield, Illinois, for burial; these three men, Brevet Lt. Col. Samuel Brown Wylie Mitchell, Lt. Col. Thomas Ellwood Zell, and Captain Peter Dirck Keyser, are considered the founders of the Order. To demonstrate their loyalty, they decided to form a "Legion" modeled on the Society of the Cincinnati. The Loyal Legion was organized mainly during the same meetings that planned Lincoln's funeral and during a mass meeting of Philadelphia war veterans on April 20, culminating in a meeting on May 31, 1865, in Independence Hall in Philadelphia, at which the name was chosen.

The Order initially was composed of three classes of members:

- Companions of the First Class
  - Original Companions of the First Class The First Class was constituted of officers who had fought in the Army, Navy, or Marine Corps of the United States in the suppression of the Rebellion, or enlisted men who had so served and were subsequently commissioned in the regular forces of the United States. They were the Original Companions of the Order.
  - Hereditary Companions of the First Class The eldest direct male lineal descendants of deceased Original Companions or eligible officers could be admitted as "Hereditary Companions of the First Class."
- Companions of the Second Class. The Second Class were the eldest direct male lineal descendants of living Original Companions or of living individuals who were eligible for membership in the First Class. This class was discontinued as the former officers expired and the Order became composed entirely of descendants.
- Companions of the Third Class. The Third Class comprised distinguished civilians who had rendered faithful and conspicuous service to the Union during the Civil War. By the law of the Order, no new elections to this class were made after 1890.

The use of the Rule of Primogeniture was abolished in 1905 for both the First and Second classes of membership, opening membership to all male lineal descendants, and later changes opened membership to male lineal descendants of siblings of eligible officers (i.e., a nephew relationship), and in 2021, to male lineal descendants of an aunt or uncle of eligible officers (i.e., a first-cousin relationship).

== Later history ==
The Loyal Legion grew rapidly in the late 19th century and had Companions in every Northern state and many of the states that had once formed the Confederacy. The Commandery in Chief was established on October 21, 1885, with authority over the 14 state commanderies. Previously, the Pennsylvania Commandery functioned as the "first among equals" of the commanderies as it was both the oldest and largest.

At its height about 1900, the Order had more than 8,000 Civil War veterans as active members, including nearly all notable general and flag officers and several presidents: Ulysses S. Grant, William T. Sherman, Philip H. Sheridan, George H. Thomas, George B. McClellan, Jefferson C. Davis, Rutherford B. Hayes, Chester A. Arthur, Benjamin Harrison, and William McKinley. The Order's fame was significant enough to inspire John Philip Sousa to compose the "Loyal Legion March" in its honor in 1890.

The Loyal Legion is one the oldest hereditary military societies in the United States. Predecessors to it include the Society of the Cincinnati, instituted in 1783, and the Aztec Club of 1847, both similarly founded by and for commissioned officers of the United States military.

Today, the Order serves as a hereditary society (male relatives of eligible officers) rather than as a functioning military order (though many Companions are either military veterans or on active military duty). Among other activities, Companions organize and participate in commemorative events, provide awards to deserving ROTC cadets, and assist with preservation efforts. Of particular note is that each year, the Loyal Legion commemorates President Lincoln's birthday with a wreath-laying ceremony at the Lincoln Memorial in Washington, D.C. In 2009, the MOLLUS helped coordinate an extended tribute with the help of the Abraham Lincoln Bicentennial Commission to celebrate the two-hundredth anniversary of Lincoln's birthday.

There are now three basic categories of membership: Hereditary, Associate (non-hereditary), and Honorary. Just as many Original Companions of the Order were also members of the Grand Army of the Republic (the "GAR"), many current Companions of the Order are also members of the Sons of Union Veterans of the Civil War (SUVCW), the legal heir to the GAR.

Organizationally, the Loyal Legion is composed of a National Commandery-in-Chief and individual state Commanderies. There are currently 21 state Commanderies. Current national officers for the 2023–2025 term include Commander-in-Chief Michael Timothy Bates, Esq. of New Jersey; Senior Vice-Commander-in-Chief Paul Thomas Davis of Michigan; Junior Vice-Commander-in-Chief William Frederick Forbes of Pennsylvania; Treasurer-in-Chief Lee Alan Tryon, CPA of Connecticut; Recorder-in-Chief Gary Lee Grove, Ph.D. of Pennsylvania; Registrar-in-Chief Jefferson Davis Lilly II, MPA, of Tennessee; Chancellor-in-Chief Linn William Malaznik of California; Judge Advocate-in-Chief Matthew D. Dupee, Esq. of South Carolina; Surgeon-in-Chief Peter Bayard Kane, M.D. of Pennsylvania; and Chaplain-in-Chief Jeffry Christian Burden, Esq. of Virginia.

A membership medal given to an "Original Companion" (here, Capt. Edward Taylor of the 95th Ohio Infantry). The design of the medal remains unchanged.

A membership medal worn by Brevet Col. Perrin V. Fox of the 1st Michigan Engineers. His son later wore this medal as a descendant member. Descendant members wore a ribbon with a blue stripe in the center until 1935, when all members were entitled to use a red-center ribbon.

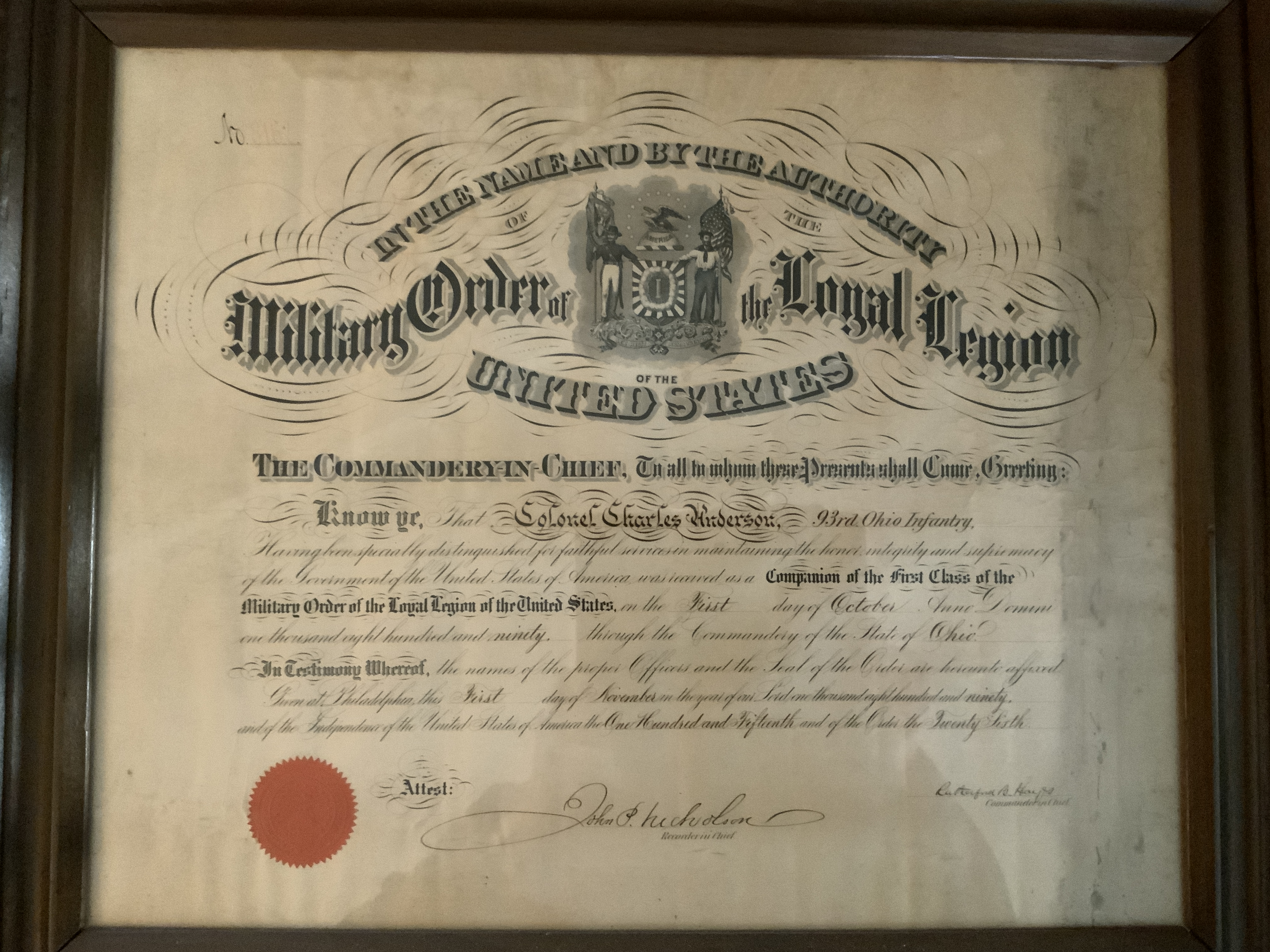
Enrollment certificate of Col. Charles Anderson, 93rd Ohio Infantry.

== Commanders-in-Chief ==
- Major General George Cadwalader – 1865–79. First MOLLUS Commander-in-Chief. (Died in office.)
- Major General Winfield Scott Hancock – 1879–86. (Died in office.)
- Major General Rutherford B. Hayes – 1886.
- General Philip H. Sheridan – 1886–88. (Died in office.)
- Major General Rutherford B. Hayes – 1888–93. (Died in office.)
- Rear Admiral John J. Almy – 1893.
- Brigadier General Lucius Fairchild – 1893–95.
- Major General John Gibbon – 1895–96. (Died in office.)
- Rear Admiral Bancroft Gherardi – 1896–99.
- Lieutenant General John M. Schofield – 1899–1903.
- Major General David McMurtrie Gregg – 1903–05.
- Major General John R. Brooke – 1905–07.
- Major General Grenville M. Dodge – 1907–09.
- Lieutenant General John C. Bates – 1909–11.
- Rear Admiral George W. Melville – 1911–12. (Died in office.)
- Lieutenant General Arthur MacArthur – 1912. (Died in office.)
- Colonel Arnold A. Rand – 1912–13. (First non-flag officer to serve as MOLLUS commander-in-chief.)
- Brevet Brigadier General Thomas Hamlin Hubbard – 1913–15. (Died in office.)
- Rear Admiral Louis Kempff – 1915.
- Lieutenant General Samuel B.M. Young – 1915–19.
- Lieutenant General Nelson A. Miles – 1919–25. (Died in office.)
- Rear Admiral Purnell F. Harrington – 1925–27.
- Master Robert M. Thompson, USN – 1927–30. (Died in office.)
- Brigadier General Samuel W. Fountain – 1930. (Died in office.)
- Brevet Major George Mason – 1930–31.
- Captain William P. Wright – 1931–33. Commander in Chief of the Grand Army of the Republic from 1932 to 1933. (Died in office. Last Civil War veteran to serve as MOLLUS commander-in-chief.)
- Colonel Hugh Means – 1933–35.
- Colonel William Ennis Forbes – 1935–40. (Resigned.)
- Major General Malvern Hill Barnum – 1940–41.
- Mr. James Vernor Jr. – 1941–47 (First MOLLUS commander-in-chief who did not serve in the United States Armed Forces.)
- Rear Admiral Reginald R. Belknap, USN – 1947–51.
- Donald H. Whittemore – 1951–53
- Commander William C. Duval, USNR – 1953–57
- Major General Ulysses S. Grant III – 1957–61. SUVCW Commander-in-Chief, 1953–55.
- Lieutenant Colonel Donald M. Liddell Jr., USAR – 1961–62. (Resigned.)
- Lieutenant Colonel H. Durston Saylor II, USAR – 1962–64.
- Major General Clayton B. Vogel, USMC – 1964. (Died in office. Last flag officer to serve as MOLLUS commander-in-chief.)
- Colonel Walter E. Hopper, USAR – 1964–67.
- Lieutenant Colonel Lenahan O'Connell, USAR – 1967–71.
- Colonel Brooke M. Lessig, USAR – 1971–73.
- Charles Allan Brady Jr. – 1973–75.
- Colonel Joseph B. Daugherty – 1975–77.
- Thomas N. McCarter III – 1977–81.
- Lieutenant Colonel Philip M. Watrous – 1981–83.
- Alexander P. Hartnett – 1983–85.
- William H. Upham – 1985–89. (Last commander-in-chief to serve more than two years in office.)
- 1st Lieutenant Lowell V. Hammer – 1989–91. SUVCW Commander-in-Chief, 1991–92.
- Henry N. Sawyer, 1991–93.
- The Hon. Colonel Scott W. Stucky, USAFR, 1993–95. Judge, U.S. Court of Appeals for the Armed Forces.
- The Rev. Canon Robert G. Carroon, 1995–97.
- The Hon. Michael P. Sullivan, 1997–99.
- Major Robert J. Bateman, 1999–2001.
- Gordon R. Bury II, 2001–03. SUVCW Commander-in-Chief, 1986–87.
- Douglas R. Niermeyer, 2003–05.
- Benjamin C. Frick, Esq., 2005–07.
- Karl F. Schaeffer, 2007–09.
- Keith Harrison, 2009–11. SUVCW Commander-in-Chief, 1994–95.
- Jeffry C. Burden, Esq., 2011–13.
- Waldron K. Post II, 2013–15.
- Captain James A. Simmons, USAF, 2015–17.
- Colonel Eric A. Rojo, USA, 2017–19.
- Dr. Joseph T. Coleman, 2019–21.
- Colonel Robert D. Pollock, USAF, 2021–23.
- Michael T. Bates, Esq., 2023–25.
- 1st Lieutenant Paul T. Davis, 2025 to present.

== Prominent Companions ==
Note – the ranks indicated are the highest the individual held in the United States armed forces or in state militia service and not necessarily the highest rank held during the Civil War.

=== Presidents of the United States ===
- Abraham Lincoln (Captain, Illinois Militia) – Posthumously enrolled.
- Ulysses S. Grant (General, U.S. Army) – Veteran Companion.
- Rutherford B. Hayes (Brevet Major General, Volunteers) – Veteran Companion and MOLLUS Commander in Chief from 1888 to 1893.
- Chester A. Arthur (Brigadier General, New York Militia) – 3rd Class Companion.
- Benjamin Harrison (Brevet Brigadier General, Volunteers) – Veteran Companion.
- William McKinley (Brevet Major, 23rd Ohio Volunteer Infantry) – Veteran Companion.
- Herbert Hoover – Honorary Companion (elected in 1961).
- Dwight Eisenhower (General of the Army, U.S. Army) – Honorary Companion (elected in 1953).

Note – Presidents Andrew Johnson and James Garfield were both generals in the Union Army during the Civil War and were thus eligible to be veteran companions of MOLLUS but did not join the Order.

=== Vice Presidents ===
- Vice President Hannibal Hamlin, who had served under President Lincoln from 1861 to 1865, was elected in 1865 as a Companion of the 3rd Class in the Commandery of Pennsylvania. He transferred to the Commandery of Maine in 1890. While he was vice president, he served as a corporal with Company A of the Maine State Guard (a.k.a. Maine Coast Guards) at Fort McClary in Kittery, Maine from July to September 1864.
- Vice President Henry Wilson, who served under President Grant from 1873 until he died in 1875, was colonel of the 22nd Regiment Massachusetts Volunteer Infantry. He was elected in 1865 as a Companion of the First Class in the Commandery of Pennsylvania.
- Vice President Charles G. Dawes, who served under President Coolidge from 1925 to 1929, became a First Class Companion in succession to his father, Brevet Brigadier General Rufus Dawes in 1899. Vice President Dawes served as a brigadier general with the U.S. Army during World War I and also received the Nobel Peace Prize.

In addition to the above, President Andrew Johnson, vice president before President Lincoln's death and the founding of MOLLUS, was eligible to become a First Class Companion of MOLLUS but did not join the Order. President Chester A. Arthur, who was vice president prior to the death of President Garfield, was elected in 1882 as a 3rd Class Companion while serving as president. Vice President Richard Cheney was eligible to become a hereditary MOLLUS companion by right of an ancestor's service in the Union Army.

=== Honorary Companions ===
A limited number of individuals may be elected as Honorary Companions of MOLLUS. They are usually individuals with distinguished careers in public service or the military.

- President and General of the Army Dwight D. Eisenhower (elected in 1953)
- President Herbert Hoover (elected in 1961)
- Fleet Admiral Chester W. Nimitz – Commander in Chief of the Pacific Fleet and Chief of Naval Operations.
- General of the Army Omar Bradley – Chief of Staff of the United States Army and Chairman of the Joint Chiefs of Staff.
- Lieutenant General Milton G. Baker
- Lieutenant General John L. Ballantyne III
- Rear Admiral Thomas V. Cooper
- HRH Amadeo, Prince of Savoy
- Mr. Ken Burns – Filmmaker.
- Mr. Don Troiani – Artist.

=== Veteran Companions ===
==== United States Army ====
Note – The rank indicated is the highest held in the Regular Army, the Volunteers, or in retirement.

===== Generals =====
- General Ulysses S. Grant – United States Army Commanding General.
- General William Tecumseh Sherman – United States Army Commanding General.
- General Philip H. Sheridan – United States Army Commanding General and MOLLUS Commander in Chief, 1886–88.
- Lieutenant General John M. Schofield – Medal of Honor recipient, US Army Commanding General and MOLLUS Commander in Chief, 1899–1903.
- Lieutenant General Nelson A. Miles – Medal of Honor recipient, US Army Commanding General and MOLLUS Commander in Chief, 1919–25.
- Lieutenant General Samuel B.M. Young – First United States Army Chief of Staff and MOLLUS Commander in Chief, 1915–19.
- Lieutenant General Adna R. Chaffee – United States Army Chief of Staff.
- Lieutenant General John C. Bates – Army Chief of Staff and MOLLUS Commander in Chief, 1909–11.
- Lieutenant General Henry C. Corbin – Adjutant General of the United States Army.
- Lieutenant General Arthur MacArthur – Medal of Honor recipient and MOLLUS Commander in Chief, 1912. (Father of General Douglas MacArthur.)
- Brevet Lieutenant General Winfield Scott – United States Army Commanding General (1841–1861) and hero of the War of 1812.
- Major General Thomas M. Anderson – Nephew of Brevet Major General Robert Anderson.
- Major General Christopher C. Augur – Veteran of the Mexican War and wounded in action at the Battle of Cedar Mountain.
- Major General Frank Baldwin – Two-time Medal of Honor recipient.
- Major General Nathaniel P. Banks – Governor of Massachusetts and Congressman.
- Major General Zenas Bliss – Medal of Honor recipient.
- Major General Joseph Cabell Breckinridge Sr. – Cousin of Vice President and Confederate general John C. Breckinridge.
- Major General John R. Brooke – MOLLUS Commander in Chief, 1905–07.
- Major General Ambrose Burnside – GAR Commander-in-Chief, 1871–73; Governor of Rhode Island and United States Senator.
- Major General Daniel Butterfield – Medal of Honor recipient.
- Major General George Cadwalader – First MOLLUS Commander and Chief, 1865–79.
- Major General Silas Casey – Career Army officer.
- Major General John Clem – Youngest Union soldier in the Civil War.
- Major General George Crook - Career Army officer.
- Major General George Armstrong Custer – Legendary Cavalryman and cultural icon.
- Major General Napoleon J.T. Dana
- Major General Grenville M. Dodge – MOLLUS Commander in Chief, 1907–09.
- Major General William H. Emory
- Major General Francis Fessenden – Lost a leg while commanding a brigade in the Red River Campaign. Mayor of Portland, Maine.
- Major General James W. Forsyth – Commander of the 7th Cavalry Regiment at the Wounded Knee Massacre
- Major General William B. Franklin
- Major General John Gibbon – MOLLUS Commander in Chief, 1895–96
- Major General George L. Gillespie – Medal of Honor recipient, Chief Engineer and Assistant Chief of Staff of the United States Army
- Major General Gordon Granger – Author of the Juneteenth proclamation
- Major General Adolphus Greely – Arctic explorer and Medal of Honor recipient
- Major General George S. Greene – Hero of Culp's Hill in the Battle of Gettysburg
- Major General Charles Smith Hamilton - Mexican War veteran and U.S. Marshal
- Major General Schuyler Hamilton – Grandson of Alexander Hamilton
- Major General Winfield Scott Hancock – MOLLUS Commander in Chief, 1879–86
- Major General Guy V. Henry – Recipient of the Medal of Honor
- Major General Oliver Otis Howard – Founder and namesake of Howard University
- Major General Charles Frederic Humphrey Sr. - Quartermaster General and Medal of Honor recipient.
- Major General Henry Jackson Hunt – Commanded U.S. artillery during Pickett's Charge at the Battle of Gettysburg
- Major General Erasmus D. Keyes
- Major General J. Warren Keifer – U.S. Representative and veteran of the Spanish–American War
- Major General William August Kobbé
- Major General Henry W. Lawton – Medal of Honor recipient
- Major General John A. Logan – GAR Commander-in-Chief, 1868–71; founder of Decoration Day; United States Senator and vice presidential candidate
- Major General George B. McClellan – United States Army Commanding General.
- Major General Henry C. Merriam – Medal of Honor recipient.
- Major General Wesley Merritt – Superintendent of West Point.
- Major General Robert Patterson – Veteran of the War of 1812, Mexican War and Civil War.
- Major General John Pope
- Major General John C. Robinson – Commander-in-Chief of the Grand Army of the Republic, 1877–79; Lieutenant Governor of New York, 1873–74; and Medal of Honor recipient.
- Major General William S. Rosecrans
- Major General Thomas H. Ruger
- Major General Theodore Runyon – Mayor of Newark, New Jersey and Ambassador to Germany.
- Major General William R. Shafter – Commander of V Corps in Cuba during the Spanish–American War.
- Major General Thomas W. Sherman
- Major General Daniel Sickles - Hero of the Battle of Gettysburg.
- Major General Henry W. Slocum - Commanded XX Corps and the Army of Georgia.
- Major General David S. Stanley – Medal of Honor recipient.
- Major General George Stoneman – Governor of California.
- Major General Samuel S. Sumner - Son of Major General Edwin Vose Sumner.
- Major General Wager Swayne - Medal of Honor recipient and military governor of Alabama.
- Major General Alfred Terry
- Major General George H. Thomas – Hero of the Battles of Chickamauga, Chattanooga, and Nashville.
- Major General James F. Wade - Commanded the 5th Army Corps in Cuba after the Spanish-American War.
- Major General Lew Wallace - Author of Ben Hur.
- Major General John F. Weston - Medal of Honor recipient.
- Major General Frank Wheaton
- Major General Loyd Wheaton – Medal of Honor recipient.
- Major General James Harrison Wilson – Veteran of the Civil War, Spanish–American War, and the Boxer Rebellion.
- Major General Thomas J. Wood
- Brevet Major General Adelbert Ames – Mississippi Governor and Senator.
- Brevet Major General Russell A. Alger – GAR Commander-in-Chief, 1889–90; Secretary of War during the Spanish–American War.
- Brevet Major General Nicholas Longworth Anderson – Nephew of Brevet Major General Robert Anderson and father of Ambassador Larz Anderson.
- Brevet Major General Robert Anderson – Hero of Fort Sumter.
- Brevet Major General Christopher Columbus Andrews – Diplomat and forester.
- Brevet Major General Absalom Baird – Medal of Honor recipient.
- Brevet Major General George W. Baird - Medal of Honor recipient.
- Brevet Major General John G. Barnard – Distinguished military engineer.
- Brevet Major General George L. Beal – Treasurer of Maine.
- Brevet Major General William W. Belknap - Secretary of War.
- Brevet Major General John Milton Brannan – Career Army officer. Served in Mexican and Civil Wars.
- Brevet Major General James Henry Carleton
- Brevet Major General Joshua Lawrence Chamberlain – Medal of Honor recipient, Hero of Little Round Top in the Battle of Gettysburg and Governor of Maine.
- Brevet Major General Augustus Louis Chetlain – Organized the first Black Regiment in the Western Theater.
- Brevet Major General Charles H.T. Collis - Medal of Honor recipient.
- Brevet Major General Philip St. George Cooke – Author of cavalry tactics.
- Brevet Major General Newton Martin Curtis - Medal of Honor recipient.
- Brevet Major General Jefferson Columbus Davis – first Commander of the Department of Alaska.
- Brevet Major General Charles Devens – Commander-in-Chief of the Grand Army of the Republic, 1873–75.
- Brevet Major General James Deering Fessenden
- Brevet Major General Manning Ferguson Force - Medal of Honor recipient.
- Brevet Major General James Barnet Fry
- Brevet Major General George W. Getty
- Brevet Major General Lewis A. Grant - Medal of Honor recipient.
- Brevet Major General David McM. Gregg – Cavalry commander.
- Brevet Major General Cyrus Hamlin – Son of Vice President Hannibal Hamlin.
- Brevet Major General John F. Hartranft – GAR Commander-in-Chief, 1875–77; Governor of Pennsylvania and Medal of Honor recipient.
- Brevet Major General John Porter Hatch - Medal of Honor recipient.
- Brevet Major General Albion P. Howe – Veteran of the Mexican War and the Civil War.
- Brevet Major General George H. Nye – Commander of the 29th Maine Regiment.
- Brevet Major General Richard W. Johnson
- Brevet Major General Hugh Judson Kilpatrick – one of the youngest generals in the Civil War.
- Brevet Major General Martin T. McMahon - Medal of Honor recipient.
- Brevet Major General St. Clair Augustine Mulholland - Medal of Honor recipient.
- Brevet Major General Alfred L. Pearson - Medal of Honor recipient.
- Brevet Major General Theodore S. Peck – Medal of Honor recipient.
- Brevet Major General Galusha Pennypacker – Youngest general during the Civil War.
- Brevet Major General William H. Powell - Medal of Honor recipient.
- Brevet Major General Rufus Saxton - Medal of Honor recipient.
- Brevet Major General William H. Sewell - Medal of Honor recipient.
- Brevet Major General Alexander Shaler - Medal of Honor recipient.
- Brevet Major General George H. Sharpe – Secret service agent.
- Brevet Major General Charles H. Smith - Medal of Honor recipient.
- Brevet Major General John W. Sprague - Medal of Honor recipient.
- Brevet Major General Alfred Thomas Archimedes Torbert - Diplomat.
- Brevet Major General William Vandever - United States representative.
- Brevet Major General Alexander S. Webb - Medal of Honor recipient and City College of New York president.
- Brevet Major General William Wells – Medal of Honor recipient.
- Brevet Major General Orlando B. Willcox – Medal of Honor recipient.
- Brevet Major General James Alexander Williamson - Medal of Honor recipient.
- Brigadier General George Lippitt Andrews
- Brigadier General Abraham K. Arnold - Medal of Honor recipient.
- Brigadier General John B. Babcock – Career officer and Medal of Honor recipient.
- Brigadier General Richard Napoleon Batchelder – Quartermaster General and Medal of Honor recipient.
- Brigadier General Joshua Hall Bates – Ohio state senator.
- Brigadier General William E. Birkhimer – Medal of Honor recipient.
- Brigadier General William Henry Bisbee - Career Army officer.
- Brigadier General Louis H. Carpenter – Medal of Honor recipient.
- Brigadier General Thomas Lincoln Casey – Engineer who completed the Washington Monument.
- Brigadier General Powell Clayton – Governor of Arkansas, U.S. Senator, and Ambassador to Mexico.
- Brigadier General Charles A. Coolidge
- Brigadier General Thomas L. Crittenden
- Brigadier General Francis S. Dodge - Army Paymaster General and Medal of Honor recipient.
- Brigadier General Eugene D. Dimmick – Career officer.
- Brigadier General Edgar S. Dudley
- Brigadier General Richard C. Drum – U.S. Army adjutant general.
- Brigadier General Charles P. Eagan – U.S. Army Commissary General court-martialed during the "embalmed beef" scandal during the Spanish–American War. Expelled from MOLLUS after making disparaging remarks about General Nelson Miles before a Congressional committee investigating the scandal.
- Brigadier General William Ennis
- Brigadier General Lucius Fairchild – MOLLUS Commander in Chief, 1893–95; GAR Commander-in-Chief, 1886–87; Governor of Wisconsin and Minister to Spain.
- Brigadier General Samuel W. Fountain – MOLLUS Commander in Chief, 1930.
- Brigadier General Royal T. Frank - Career Army officer. Veteran of the Civil War and Spanish-American War.
- Brigadier General Henry Blanchard Freeman – Medal of Honor recipient.
- Brigadier General John C. Gilmore - Medal of Honor recipient.
- Brigadier General Edward S. Godfrey – Medal of Honor recipient.
- Brigadier General Edward H. Hobson
- Brigadier General Lucius F. Hubbard – Governor of Minnesota. A veteran of both the Civil War and the Spanish–American War.
- Brigadier General Eli L. Huggins – Medal of Honor recipient.
- Brigadier General Bernard J. D. Irwin – Medal of Honor recipient.
- Brigadier General Horatio Collins King - Medal of Honor recipient.
- Brigadier General Charles Mattocks - Medal of Honor recipient.
- Brigadier General John H. Patterson - Medal of Honor recipient.
- Brigadier General Alexander Cummings McWhorter Pennington Jr. – Career Army officer.
- Brigadier General Richard Henry Pratt – Founder of the Carlisle Indian Industrial School.
- Brigadier General Americus V. Rice – United States Representative.
- Brigadier General Edmund Rice – Medal of Honor recipient.
- Brigadier General Theophilus Francis Rodenbough - Medal of Honor recipient.
- Brigadier General George B. Rodney
- Brigadier General William H. Seward Jr. – Son of Secretary of State William Seward.
- Brigadier General Rufus Saxton – Third Medal of Honor recipient.
- Brigadier General M.A.W. Shockley – medical corps career officer
- Brigadier General Theodore Schwan - Medal of Honor recipient.
- Brigadier General Jacob H. Smith - War criminal.
- Brigadier General Julius Stahel – Hungarian-American Medal of Honor recipient and diplomat.
- Brigadier General Edwin Vose Sumner Jr.
- Brigadier General David G. Swaim – Judge Advocate General of the U.S. Army.
- Brigadier General George Miller Sternberg – U.S. Army Surgeon General.
- Brigadier General Stephen Thomas - Medal of Honor recipient.
- Brigadier General Egbert L. Viele – United States Representative.
- Brigadier General Daniel D. Wheeler – Medal of Honor recipient.
- Brigadier General Samuel Whitside – Major of the 7th Cavalry Regiment at the Wounded Knee Massacre.
- Brigadier General Edward Bancroft Williston - Medal of Honor recipient.
- Brigadier General John Moulder Wilson – Chief Engineer of the Army and Medal of Honor recipient.
- Brigadier General Henry Clay Wood - Medal of Honor recipient.
- Brigadier General Carle A. Woodruff – Medal of Honor recipient.
- Brigadier General Horatio Gouverneur Wright – Chief Engineer of the United States Army.
- Brevet Brigadier General Charles Francis Adams Jr. – Railroad president.
- Brevet Brigadier General John Jacob Astor III – Philanthropist and socialite.
- Brevet Brigadier General Delevan Bates - Medal of Honor recipient.
- Brevet Brigadier General John C. Black – Medal of Honor recipient and Commander in Chief of the Grand Army of the Republic, 1903–04.
- Brevet Brigadier General Charles Brayton – Rhode Island postmaster and political boss.
- Brevet Brigadier General Charles Elwood Brown - Congressman.
- Brevet Brigadier General Edmond Butler - Medal of Honor recipient.
- Brevet Brigadier General Cecil Clay – Medal of Honor recipient.
- Brevet Brigadier General Henry B. Clitz – Veteran of Mexican War.
- Brevet Brigadier General Amasa Cobb – United States Representative.
- Brevet Brigadier General William Cogswell - United States Representative.
- Brevet Brigadier General Caspar Crowninshield
- Brevet Brigadier General Byron M. Cutcheon - Medal of Honor recipient.
- Brevet Brigadier General Rufus Dawes – Great-grandson of patriot William Dawes.
- Brevet Brigadier General Samuel Fallows – Reformed Episcopal bishop.
- Brevet Brigadier General Thomas Clement Fletcher - Governor of Missouri.
- Brevet Brigadier General John P. S. Gobin – GAR Commander-in-Chief, 1897–98; and lieutenant governor of Pennsylvania.
- Brevet Brigadier General Nathan Goff Jr.
- Brevet Brigadier General Edwin S. Greeley – President General of the Sons of the American Revolution.
- Brevet Brigadier General Oliver Duff Greene - Medal of Honor recipient.
- Brevet Brigadier General James G. Grindlay - Medal of Honor recipient.
- Brevet Brigadier General Charles H. Grosvenor - Congressman.
- Brevet Brigadier General Charles Hamlin – Son of Vice President Hannibal Hamlin.
- Brevet Brigadier General Thomas J. Henderson - United States representative.
- Brevet Brigadier General William Levis James – Chief quartermaster of the Department of Virginia.
- Brevet Brigadier General Albert G. Lawrence – Ambassador to Costa Rica.
- Brevet Brigadier General Stephen Moffitt
- Brevet Brigadier General John Willock Noble – Secretary of the Interior.
- Brevet Brigadier General Paul A. Oliver - Medal of Honor recipient.
- Brevet Brigadier General Ario Pardee Jr. – Defended Culp's Hill at the Battle of Gettysburg.
- Brevet Brigadier General Ely S. Parker – Seneca Native American aide to General Grant.
- Brevet Brigadier General Charles E. Phelps - Medal of Honor recipient.
- Brevet Brigadier General Horace Porter – Medal of Honor recipient and United States Ambassador to France.
- Brevet Brigadier General Philip S. Post - Medal of Honor recipient and Consul General to Austria-Hungary.
- Brevet Brigadier General Samuel Miller Quincy – Mayor of New Orleans.
- Brevet Brigadier General Isaac R. Sherwood – U.S. Representative
- Brevet Brigadier General Augustus B. R. Sprague – Mayor of Worcester, Massachusetts.
- Brevet Brigadier General Andrew B. Spurling - Medal of Honor recipient.
- Brevet Brigadier General Hazard Stevens – Medal of Honor recipient.
- Brevet Brigadier General Frederick W. Swift - Medal of Honor recipient.
- Brevet Brigadier General Charles Henry Tompkins Sr. - Colonel, 1st Rhode Island Light Artillery.
- Brevet Brigadier General William S. Tilton
- Brevet Brigadier General Benjamin F. Tracy - Medal of Honor recipient.
- Brevet Brigadier General Henry E. Tremain - Medal of Honor recipient.
- Brevet Brigadier General Daniel Tomkins Van Buren
- Brevet Brigadier General Victor Vifquain - Medal of Honor recipient.
- Brevet Brigadier General Francis A. Walker – President of the Massachusetts Institute of Technology
- Brevet Brigadier General Stephen Minot Weld Jr. – Businessman and horticulturalist.
- Brevet Brigadier General Joseph N. G. Whistler – Cousin of the artist James Abbott McNeill Whistler
- Brevet Brigadier General Edward W. Whitaker – Medal of Honor recipient.
- Brevet Brigadier General Langhorne Wister
- Brevet Brigadier General William H. Withington - Medal of Honor recipient.
- Brevet Brigadier General Stewart L. Woodford - Envoy to Spain.

===== Field officers =====
- Colonel Charles Anderson – 93rd Ohio Infantry, 27th Governor of Ohio, wounded at Stones River.
- Colonel Lloyd Aspinwall - Lawyer.
- Colonel George Grenville Benedict - Medal of Honor recipient.
- Colonel James S. Casey – Medal of Honor recipient.
- Colonel George Earl Church – Civil engineer, geographer, and explorer.
- Colonel Luigi Palma di Cesnola - Medal of Honor recipient and Director of the Metropolitan Museum of Art.
- Colonel John W. Foster – Ambassador and Secretary of State.
- Colonel Smith H. Hastings - Medal of Honor recipient.
- Colonel James Jackson – Medal of Honor recipient.
- Colonel William P. Kellogg – United States senator and Governor of Louisiana.
- Colonel John Mason Loomis - Lumber tycoon, philanthropist and founder of the Loomis Chaffee School.
- Colonel Douglas Putnam – Fought at the battles of Shiloh and Missionary Ridge.
- Colonel Matthew Quay – United States Senator and Medal of Honor recipient.
- Colonel James Martinus Schoonmaker - Medal of Honor recipient.
- Colonel George G. Symes - United States representative.
- Colonel Henry R. Tilton – Medal of Honor recipient.
- Colonel Amasa Tracy - Medal of Honor recipient.
- Colonel John Tweedale – Medal of Honor recipient.
- Colonel Wheelock G. Veazey – GAR Commander-in-Chief, 1890–91; and Medal of Honor recipient.
- Colonel John Wainwright – Medal of Honor recipient.
- Colonel William C. Webb – Political figure.
- Colonel John B. Weber - Congressman.
- Colonel Henry Wilson – Vice President of the United States.
- Brevet Colonel Eugene B. Beaumont – Medal of Honor recipient.
- Brevet Colonel James Coey - Medal of Honor recipient.
- Brevet Colonel Stephen P. Corliss – Medal of Honor recipient.
- Brevet Colonel Benjamin W. Crowninshield – Aide de camp to General Philip Sheridan.
- Brevet Colonel Johnston de Peyster – First re-raised U.S. flag over Richmond in 1865.
- Brevet Colonel William D. Dickey - Medal of Honor recipient.
- Brevet Colonel Douglas Hapeman - Medal of Honor recipient.
- Brevet Colonel John Hay - Secretary of State.
- Brevet Colonel Oliver Wendell Holmes Jr. – Supreme Court associate justice.
- Brevet Colonel Horatio Collins King – Medal of Honor recipient.
- Brevet Colonel Augustus Pearl Martin – Mayor of Boston.
- Brevet Colonel William R. Parnell - Medal of Honor recipient.
- Brevet Colonel Walter S. Payne – SUVCW Commander-in-Chief, 1885–87.
- Brevet Colonel Elisha Hunt Rhodes – Diarist and author and served as Senior Vice Commander-in-Chief of the GAR.
- Brevet Colonel Robert S. Robertson - Medal of Honor recipient and Lieutenant Governor of Indiana.
- Brevet Colonel Washington A. Roebling – Engineer of the Brooklyn Bridge.
- Brevet Colonel Alfred J. Sellers - Medal of Honor recipient.
- Lieutenant Colonel William Henry Harrison Benyaurd – Medal of Honor recipient.
- Lieutenant Colonel James M. Burns – Medal of Honor recipient.
- Lieutenant Colonel Frederick Fuger – Medal of Honor recipient.
- Lieutenant Colonel Asa Bird Gardiner – Lawyer, author, and controversial political figure.
- Lieutenant Colonel William W. Grout - United States Representative.
- Lieutenant Colonel Eli Lilly – Pharmaceutical chemist, industrialist, and entrepreneur.
- Lieutenant Colonel Theodore Lyman – Congressman from Massachusetts.
- Lieutenant Colonel Preston B. Plumb - United States senator.
- Lieutenant Colonel James Quinlan - Medal of Honor recipient.
- Lieutenant Colonel William Y. W. Ripley - Medal of Honor recipient.
- Lieutenant Colonel Cyrus Sears - Medal of Honor recipient.
- Lieutenant Colonel Charles Preston Wickham - United States representative.
- Lieutenant Colonel Levi Parker Wright – First Commander of Fort Whipple which became Fort Myer
- Lieutenant Colonel T. Elwood Zell – Founder of MOLLUS.
- Brevet Lieutenant Colonel Samuel Nicoll Benjamin - Medal of Honor recipient.
- Brevet Lieutenant Colonel Charles A. Clark - Medal of Honor recipient.
- Brevet Lieutenant Colonel Henry A. du Pont – Medal of Honor recipient, industrialist and United States Senator.
- Brevet Lieutenant Colonel Robert Hale Ives Goddard – Businessman and reformist politician.
- Brevet Lieutenant Colonel George Edward Gouraud - Medal of Honor recipient.
- Brevet Lieutenant Colonel Henry Lee Higginson - Philanthropist.
- Brevet Lieutenant Colonel Henry Keteltas - wounded at the Battle of Shiloh.
- Brevet Lieutenant Colonel Samuel Brown Wylie Mitchell – Founder of MOLLUS.
- Brevet Lieutenant Colonel Joseph D. Taylor - Congressman.
- Major William Sully Beebe - Medal of Honor recipient.
- Major Mason Carter - Medal of Honor recipient.
- Major John M. Deane - Medal of Honor recipient.
- Major Charles DeRudio – Adventurer.
- Major John Mead Gould – Author, diarist, and banker.
- Major Moses Harris – Medal of Honor recipient.
- Major William W. McCammon - Medal of Honor recipient.
- Major Myles Moylan – Medal of Honor recipient.
- Major James B. Pond - Medal of Honor recipient.
- Major Charles M. Rockefeller – Medal of Honor recipient.
- Major Henry Romeyn - Medal of Honor recipient.
- Major Joseph A. Sladen – Medal of Honor recipient.
- Major Sidney W. Thaxter - Medal of Honor recipient.
- Major Hampton S. Thomas - Medal of Honor recipient.
- Major Clifford Thomson - Medal of Honor recipient.
- Major Moses Veale - Medal of Honor recipient.
- Major William Warner – GAR Commander-in-Chief, 1888–89 and United States senator.
- Major Edmund Zalinski – Inventor of the pneumatic dynamite gun.
- Surgeon Joseph K. Corson - Medal of Honor recipient.
- Surgeon Richard J. Curran - Medal of Honor recipient.
- Surgeon Gabriel Grant - Medal of Honor recipient.
- Surgeon George E. Ranney - Medal of Honor recipient.
- Surgeon John Maynard Woodworth – First Surgeon General of the United States.
- Paymaster Joseph W. Wham - Paymaster robbed of $28,000 by bandits in 1889.
- Brevet Major William H. Appleton - Medal of Honor recipient.
- Brevet Major Charles E. Belknap – U.S. Representative.
- Brevet Major Augustus P. Davis – SUVCW founder.
- Brevet Major Ira H. Evans – Medal of Honor recipient.
- Brevet Major George R. Fearing, Sr. - Socialite and Mayor of Newport, Rhode Island
- Brevet Major Charles Gilbert Gould - Medal of Honor recipient.
- Brevet Major Rufus King Jr. – Medal of Honor recipient.
- Brevet Major William Marland - Medal of Honor recipient.
- Brevet Major George H. Maynard – Medal of Honor recipient.
- Brevet Major John Patterson Rea – GAR Commander-in-Chief, 1887–88.
- Brevet Major John Wallace Scott – Medal of Honor recipient.
- Brevet Major William G. Tracy - Medal of Honor recipient.
- Brevet Major Adelbert B. Twitchell – Educator.

===== Company officers =====
- Captain John G. B. Adams – Medal of Honor recipient and GAR Commander-in-Chief, 1893–94.
- Captain Marion T. Anderson - Medal of Honor recipient.
- Captain Robert Burns Beath – GAR Commander-in-Chief, 1883–84.
- Captain Alexander M. Beattie - Medal of Honor recipient.
- Captain Wilmon W. Blackmar - Medal of Honor recipient and Commander-in-Chief of the Grand Army of the Republic, 1904-05.
- Captain George W. Brush – Medal of Honor recipient.
- Captain Edward Lyon Buchwalter – Business executive.
- Captain Samuel Swinfin Burdett – GAR Commander-in-Chief, 1885–86.
- Captain John J. Carter - Medal of Honor recipient.
- Captain Robert G. Carter – Medal of Honor recipient.
- Captain Walter H. Cooke - Medal of Honor recipient.
- Captain Charles D. Copp - Medal of Honor recipient.
- Captain Stephen P. Corliss - Medal of Honor recipient.
- Captain Andrew Davidson - Medal of Honor recipient.
- Captain George E. Davis - Medal of Honor recipient.
- Captain Theodore R. Davis – Illustrator.
- Captain William W. Douglas – Chief Justice of the Rhode Island Supreme Court.
- Captain and Governor Elisha Dyer – Governor of Rhode Island.
- Captain George W. Ford - Medal of Honor recipient.
- Captain Frank Furness - Prolific architect and Medal of Honor recipient.
- Captain Samuel R. Honey - Lieutenant Governor of Rhode Island.
- Captain Francis Irsch - Medal of Honor recipient.
- Captain Leverett M. Kelley - Medal of Honor recipient.
- Captain Thomas Kerr - Medal of Honor recipient.
- Captain William A. Ketcham – Indiana Attorney General, Commander-in-Chief of the Grand Army of the Republic.
- Captain Peter Dirck Keyser – Founder of MOLLUS.
- Captain Oscar Lapham – U.S. Representative from Rhode Island.
- Captain Robert Todd Lincoln – Son of President Abraham Lincoln.
- Captain Josiah O. Livingston - Medal of Honor recipient.
- Captain Sylvester H. Martin - Medal of Honor recipient.
- Captain George Sargent Merrill – GAR Commander-in-Chief, 1881–82.
- Captain William E. Miller - Medal of Honor recipient.
- Captain Elias Riggs Monfort – GAR Commander-in-Chief, 1915–16.
- Captain Clement C. Moore II - Architect and grandson of the author of Twas the Night Before Christmas.
- Captain Lee Nutting - Medal of Honor recipient.
- Captain Walter S. Payne – SUVCW Commander-in-Chief, 1885–1887.
- Captain Prince Philippe, Count of Paris (a.k.a. Philippe d'Orleans) – Claimant to the French throne.
- Captain Theodore S. Peck - Medal of Honor recipient.
- Captain George H. Plowman - Medal of Honor recipient.
- Captain James P. Postles - Medal of Honor recipient.
- Captain Noble D. Preston - Medal of Honor recipient.
- Captain Charles F. Rand - Medal of Honor recipient.
- Captain Walter A. Read - General Treasurer of Rhode Island.
- Captain Axel H. Reed - Medal of Honor recipient.
- Captain Milton Russell - Medal of Honor recipient.
- Captain Harlan J. Swift - Medal of Honor recipient.
- Captain Albert C. Thompson - Congressman.
- Captain John Michael Tobin - Medal of Honor recipient.
- Captain John J. Toffey - Medal of Honor recipient.
- Captain Charlemagne Tower – Lawyer and businessman.
- Captain Voltaire P. Twombly - Medal of Honor recipient.
- Captain Elihu S. Williams - Congressman.
- Captain Edward N. Whittier - Medal of Honor recipient.
- Captain Albert D. Wright - Medal of Honor recipient.
- Brevet Captain John Vernou Bouvier Sr. - Great Grandfather of Jacqueline Kennedy.
- Brevet Captain Albert E. Fernald - Medal of Honor recipient.
- Brevet Captain Joseph B. Foraker – Governor of Ohio and United States Senator.
- Brevet Captain Francis M. Smith - Medal of Honor recipient.
- Brevet Captain Walter Thorn - Medal of Honor recipient.
- Brevet Captain Wilson J. Vance - Medal of Honor recipient.
- 1st Lieutenant Charles S. Baker - Congressman.
- 1st Lieutenant Wells H. Blodgett – Medal of Honor recipient.
- 1st Lieutenant Francis E. Brownell – Medal of Honor recipient.
- 1st Lieutenant John K. Bucklyn – Medal of Honor recipient.
- 1st Lieutenant Luman L. Cadwell – Medal of Honor recipient.
- 1st Lieutenant Charles B. Clark - United States representative.
- 1st Lieutenant John C. Curtis – Medal of Honor recipient.
- 1st Lieutenant Daniel A. Dorsey – Medal of Honor recipient.
- 1st Lieutenant Allan H. Dougall - Medal of Honor recipient.
- 1st Lieutenant John Galloway – Medal of Honor recipient.
- 1st Lieutenant Thomas P. Gere - Medal of Honor recipient.
- 1st Lieutenant Charles P. Goodyear Jr. – Son of vulcanized rubber inventor Charles Goodyear.
- 1st Lieutenant Anson T. Hemingway - Grandfather of Ernest Hemingway.
- 1st Lieutenant Charles A. Longfellow – Son of Henry Wadsworth Longfellow.
- 1st Lieutenant John L. Mitchell – United States Senator and father of aviation prophet Billy Mitchell.
- 1st Lieutenant John Palmer – GAR Commander-in-Chief, 1891–92; and New York Secretary of State.
- 1st Lieutenant William T. Simmons - Medal of Honor recipient.
- 1st Lieutenant Henry J. Spooner - United States representative.
- 1st Lieutenant George H. Stockman - Medal of Honor recipient.
- 1st Lieutenant Anthony Taylor - Medal of Honor recipient.
- 1st Lieutenant Amos Madden Thayer – Federal judge.
- 1st Lieutenant William G. Thompson – Mayor of Detroit, Michigan.
- 1st Lieutenant John J. Toffey - Medal of Honor recipient.
- 1st Lieutenant William H. Upham - Governor of Wisconsin.
- 1st Lieutenant Oscar N. Wilmington - Last Civil War veteran to become a MOLLUS companion.
- 2nd Lieutenant Loyall Farragut - Son of Admiral David Farragut.
- 2nd Lieutenant Marcus A. Hanna – United States Senator and political boss.
- 2nd Lieutenant Abraham G. Mills – President of the National League.
- 2nd Lieutenant Samuel S. Yoder - Congressman.
- Chaplain Charles Comfort Tiffany – Episcopal clergyman.
- Chaplain Henry Clay Trumbull – Leader in the Sunday School Movement.

==== United States Navy ====
- Admiral of the Navy George Dewey – Hero of the Battle of Manila Bay. Senior admiral in the U.S. Navy from 1898 to 1917.
- Admiral David G. Farragut – Hero of the Battle of Mobile Bay. Senior admiral in the U.S. Navy from 1862 to 1870.
- Admiral David Dixon Porter – Senior admiral in the U.S. Navy from 1870 to 1891.
- Vice Admiral Stephen Clegg Rowan – Mexican War and Civil War veteran. Served as vice admiral from 1870 to 1889.
- Rear Admiral James Alden, Jr.
- Rear Admiral John J. Almy – MOLLUS Commander in Chief, 1893.
- Rear Admiral Cipriano Andrade – First U.S. Navy admiral born in Mexico.
- Rear Admiral Conway Hillyer Arnold
- Rear Admiral Theodorus Bailey
- Rear Admiral John R. Bartlett – Oceanographer.
- Rear Admiral George E. Belknap
- Rear Admiral Gottfried Blocklinger - One of the last Civil War veterans to join MOLLUS. (Insignia number 18220.)
- Rear Admiral Daniel L. Braine
- Rear Admiral William G. Buehler
- Rear Admiral and Brevet Major General Samuel P. Carter – The only person to have been an admiral in the U.S. Navy and a general in the U.S. Army.
- Rear Admiral Silas Casey III
- Rear Admiral French Ensor Chadwick – President of the Naval War College.
- Rear Admiral Charles Edgar Clark – Captain of USS Oregon during the Spanish–American War.
- Rear Admiral Joseph Coghlan – Commander of the cruiser USS Raleigh at the Battle of Manila Bay.
- Rear Admiral George Partridge Colvocoresses
- Rear Admiral Francis A. Cook – Commander of USS Brooklyn at the Battle of Santiago de Cuba.
- Rear Admiral William S. Cowles
- Rear Admiral Arent S. Crowninshield
- Rear Admiral Charles Henry Davis
- Rear Admiral Nehemiah Dyer – Participated in both the Battle of Mobile Bay and Battle of Manila Bay, where he commanded the cruiser USS Baltimore.
- Rear Admiral Robley D. Evans – Commander of the Great White Fleet.
- Rear Admiral Norman von Heldreich Farquhar
- Rear Admiral William M. Folger
- Rear Admiral John D. Ford – Participated in the Battle of Mobile Bay and the Battle of Manila Bay.
- Rear Admiral Bancroft Gherardi – MOLLUS Commander in Chief, 1896–1899.
- Rear Admiral James Henry Gillis
- Rear Admiral Henry Glass – Led capture of Guam during the Spanish–American War.
- Rear Admiral Caspar F. Goodrich – President of the Naval War College.
- Rear Admiral Purnell F. Harrington – MOLLUS Commander-in-Chief, 1925–1927.
- Rear Admiral Henry L. Howison - Captain of USS Constitution.
- Rear Admiral Richard Inch
- Rear Admiral Royal R. Ingersoll
- Rear Admiral John Irwin - Veteran of the Mexican War and the Civil War.
- Rear Admiral Philip C. Johnson - Captain of USS Constitution.
- Rear Admiral Louis Kempff – MOLLUS Commander in Chief, 1915.
- Rear Admiral Lewis A. Kimberly
- Rear Admiral Stephen B. Luce – Founder of the United States Naval War College.
- Rear Admiral Bowman H. McCalla – Captured Guantanamo Bay, Cuba in 1898.
- Rear Admiral Edward Y. McCauley - Career Navy officer.
- Rear Admiral Richard Worsam Meade III – Nephew of Major General George G. Meade.
- Rear Admiral George W. Melville – MOLLUS Commander in Chief, 1911–1912, a survivor of the ill-fated Jeannette expedition and recipient of the Congressional Gold Medal.
- Rear Admiral John Porter Merrell – President of the Naval War College.
- Rear Admiral Jefferson Franklin Moser
- Rear Admiral John E. Pillsbury - President of the National Geographic Society.
- Rear Admiral George H. Preble – Nephew of Commodore Edward Preble.
- Rear Admiral William Radford
- Rear Admiral Alexander Rhind – Veteran of the Mexican War.
- Rear Admiral Christopher Raymond Perry Rodgers - Nephew of Commodores Oliver Hazard Perry and Matthew C. Perry.
- Rear Admiral Frederick Rodgers - Grandson of Commodore Matthew C. Perry.
- Rear Admiral John Augustus Rodgers - Grandson of Commodore Matthew C. Perry.
- Rear Admiral John Henry Russell
- Rear Admiral William T. Sampson – Commander of Naval Forces at the Battle of Santiago de Cuba.
- Rear Admiral Thomas O. Selfridge
- Rear Admiral Thomas O. Selfridge Jr.
- Rear Admiral Winfield Scott Schley – Commanded cruiser USS Brooklyn at the Battle of Santiago de Cuba.
- Rear Admiral Montgomery Sicard – Chief of the US Navy Bureau of Ordnance.
- Rear Admiral Charles D. Sigsbee – Commanding officer of USS Maine.
- Rear Admiral Edwin M. Shepard - Captain of USS Constitution.
- Rear Admiral Oscar F. Stanton - Captain of USS Constitution.
- Rear Admiral Charles Stewart – Captain of USS Constitution and hero of the War of 1812.
- Rear Admiral Yates Stirling
- Rear Admiral Charles H. Stockton – President of the Naval War College.
- Rear Admiral William T. Swinburne
- Rear Admiral Edward D. Taussig – Claimed Wake Island and Governor of Guam.
- Rear Admiral Henry Clay Taylor – President of the Naval War College.
- Rear Admiral Henry Thatcher - Grandson of Major General Henry Knox.
- Rear Admiral George H. Wadleigh
- Rear Admiral Henry A. Walke
- Rear Admiral John G. Walker – Chief of the Bureau of Navigation.
- Rear Admiral John C. Watson
- Rear Admiral Frank Wildes – Captain of the cruiser USS Boston at the Battle of Manila Bay.
- Rear Admiral John L. Worden – Commanding officer of USS Monitor.
- Commodore Oscar C. Badger - Captain of USS Constitution.
- Commodore Henry Eagle
- Commodore Edward André Gabriel Barrett
- Commodore John P. Gillis – Veteran of the Mexican War and the Civil War.
- Commodore John Guest
- Commodore William H. Macomb
- Commodore John B. Merchand
- Commodore George H. Perkins
- Commodore William F. Spicer
- Commodore William T. Truxton
- Captain Charles A. Boutelle - United States representative.
- Captain John Forsyth Hanscom - Naval Constructor. Received Medal of Honor for service with 27th Maine Infantry Regiment.
- Captain Edward P. Lull - Captain of USS Constitution.
- Captain Richard Worsam Meade II – Brother of Major General George G. Meade.
- Captain Edgar C. Merriman - Commander of the Angoon bombardment.
- Captain James S. Thornton - Executive officer of USS Kearsarge in its battle with CSS Alabama.
- Commander Zera Luther Tanner – Commanding officer of the research ship USFC Albatross.
- Lieutenant Commander William Gurdon Saltonstall - Business executive.
- Acting Assistant Paymaster Edward D. Hayden - Congressman.
- Acting Assistant Paymaster Thomas Brackett Reed - Congressman.
- Master Robert M. Thompson – MOLLUS Commander in Chief, 1927–1930.
- Chief Sailmaker Charles H. Jones - Possibly the only Chief Warrant Officer to join MOLLUS as a Veteran Companion.

==== United States Marine Corps ====
- Major General Charles Heywood – Commandant of the United States Marine Corps.
- Brigadier General Henry Clay Cochrane – Veteran of the Civil War, Spanish–American War and Boxer Rebellion.
- Brigadier General James Forney – Posthumous recipient of the Marine Corps Brevet Medal.
- Brigadier General Percival Pope – Recipient of the Marine Corps Brevet Medal.
- Brigadier General Jacob Zeilin – Commandant of the United States Marine Corps.
- Brevet Brigadier General Robert Leamy Meade – Nephew of Major General George G. Meade.
- Colonel Robert W. Huntington – Commanded the 1st Marine Battalion at Guantanamo Bay in 1898.
- Colonel Charles Grymes McCawley – Commandant of the United States Marine Corps.
- Colonel William Butler Remey - First Judge Advocate General of the U.S. Navy.
- Lieutenant Colonel John L. Broome – Veteran of the Mexican War and the Civil War.
- Major and Paymaster John C. Cash

=== 3rd Class Companions ===
From 1865 to 1890, a limited number of civilians who contributed outstanding service to the United States during the Civil War were elected into the Order as 3rd Class Companions.

- Cornelius Rea Andrew - Founder of the United States Sanitary Commission.
- John Albion Andrew – Governor of Massachusetts.
- Henry B. Anthony – United States Senator and Governor of Rhode Island.
- Brigadier General Chester A. Arthur, NYM - Quartermaster General of the New York Militia.
- Alexander D. Bache – Superintendent of the U.S. Coast and Geodetic Survey and Vice President of the United States Sanitary Commission.
- Horace Binney - Lawyer.
- Austin Blair – Governor of Michigan.
- Salmon P. Chase – Secretary of the Treasury.
- George W. Crouse - United States Representative from Ohio.
- Andrew Gregg Curtin – Governor of Pennsylvania.
- Major General John Watts de Peyster, NYM – Major General in the New York Militia.
- William C. Endicott – Secretary of War.
- William Faxon - Chief Clerk of the Navy Department and Assistant Secretary of the Navy.
- Frank B. Fay - Humanitarian.
- John M. Forbes – Railroad magnate, philanthropist, and abolitionist.
- Lafayette S. Foster – United States Senator from Connecticut.
- Edward Everett Hale – Unitarian clergyman and abolitionist.
- Corporal Hannibal Hamlin – Vice President of the United States, Governor of Maine and United States Senator.
- John B. Henderson – United States Senator and author of the 13th Amendment.
- William W. Hoppin – Governor of Rhode Island.
- David Jerome – State senator from Michigan.
- Benito Juarez – President of Mexico.
- Samuel J. Kirkwood - Governor of Iowa.
- Frederic W. Lincoln – Mayor of Boston.
- Frederick F. Low – Governor of California.
- George W. McCrary – Secretary of War under President Hayes.
- Frederick Law Olmsted – Secretary of the United States Sanitary Commission and designer of Central Park.
- Joel Parker - Governor of New Jersey.
- Henry L. Pierce - Congressman and Mayor of Boston.
- John S. Pillsbury – Founder of the Pillsbury Company and Governor of Minnesota.
- Alexander Ramsey - Governor of Minnesota and United States Senator.
- Alexander H. Rice – Mayor of Boston, Congressman and Governor of Massachusetts.
- Theodore Roosevelt Sr. – Treasurer of the Union League Club and father of President Theodore Roosevelt.
- William H. Seward – Secretary of State.
- John Sherman – Secretary of State, Secretary of the Treasury, and United States Senator.
- Reverend Matthew Simpson - Methodist bishop.
- Leonard T. Smith
- James Speed – Attorney General.
- William Sprague – Governor of Rhode Island and United States Senator.
- Edwin M. Stanton – Secretary of War.
- Brigadier General Franklin Townsend, NYNG - Helped raise the 7th New York Heavy Artillery.
- John P. Usher – Secretary of the Interior.
- Gideon Welles – Secretary of the Navy.

=== Hereditary Companions ===
Initially, the MOLLUS had Companions of the Second Class, the eldest sons of Companions of the First Class (i.e., veterans of the Civil War who also held a commission at some point). A Second Class Companion became a First Class Companion upon his father's death, and brothers of fallen officers were allowed to join as hereditary companions if there was no surviving issue. These practices were discontinued in 1905 when the MOLLUS Constitution was changed to allow any direct male descendant of a U.S. Army officer to become a MOLLUS Companion. The nomenclature of First Class and Second Class Companions was discarded, leaving only the qualifiers of "Original" and "Hereditary" Companions. Later, the eligibility rules were changed to allow nephews of U.S. officers to become hereditary Companions of the MOLLUS; and as of October 2021, a first-cousin relationship to an officer (i.e., the officer was the child of the aunt or uncle of the applicant) qualifies the applicant for hereditary membership.

==== Military and naval officers ====
- General of the Army Douglas MacArthur – Legendary general. Son of Lieutenant General Arthur MacArthur Jr.
- General Jonathan Wainwright – Medal of Honor recipient.
- Admiral William V. Pratt – President of the Naval War College and Chief of Naval Operations.
- Lieutenant General Albert Jesse Bowley Sr. – Veteran of the Spanish–American War and World War I.
- Lieutenant General Adna R. Chaffee Jr. – Father of the U.S. Army Armor branch.
- Lieutenant General John MacNair Wright Jr. – Veteran of World War II and the Vietnam War.
- Vice Admiral Henry Varnum Butler, USN - Career naval officer and aviator who was onboard USS Olympia during the Battle of Manila Bay.
- Vice Admiral Walter N. Vernou, USN – Veteran of the Spanish–American War, World War I and World War II.
- Major General Malvern Hill Barnum – Commanded the 183rd Brigade during World War I. MOLLUS Commander in Chief, 1940–41.
- Major General Preston Brown - Deputy Chief of Staff of the U.S. Army.
- Major General Joseph T. Dickman - Commanded the US Third Army during the Occupation of the Rhineland following World War I.
- Major General Frederick Dent Grant – Son of General Ulysses S. Grant.
- Major General Ulysses S. Grant III – MOLLUS Commander in Chief, 1957–61; SUVCW Commander-in-Chief, 1953–55; and Aztec Club of 1847 President, 1930–31, 1951–52, 1953–54 and 1955–56.
- Major General Sherman Miles – Son of Lieutenant General Nelson A. Miles.
- Major General John H. Russell Jr., USMC – Commandant of the Marine Corps.
- Major General Henry G. Sharpe – Quartermaster General of the Army.
- Major General Samuel D. Sturgis Jr. – General in World War I.
- Major General Clayton Barney Vogel, USMC – Founder of the Navajo Code Talkers. MOLLUS Commander in Chief in 1964.
- Rear Admiral Charles J. Badger – Commander in Chief, Atlantic Fleet, 1913–14.
- Rear Admiral Reginald R. Belknap – MOLLUS Commander in Chief, 1947–51.
- Rear Admiral Frederick C. Billard, USCG - Commandant of the United States Coast Guard.
- Rear Admiral William H. Emory Jr., USN
- Rear Admiral Franck Taylor Evans, USN - Son of Rear Admiral Robley D. Evans.
- Rear Admiral John B. Hamilton, USPHS – Second Surgeon General of the United States.
- Rear Admiral Richard Worsam Meade III, USN
- Rear Admiral Yates Stirling Jr., USN
- Rear Admiral Herbert Winslow – Son of Rear Admiral John Ancrum Winslow.
- Brigadier General Charles Wheaton Abbot Jr. – Adjutant General of Rhode Island.
- Brigadier General George Andrews – Adjutant General of the United States Army.
- Brigadier General William M. Cruikshank
- Brigadier General Elisha Dyer Jr., RIM – Governor of Rhode Island.
- Brigadier General Samuel Milby Harrington, USMC - Son of MOLLUS Commander in Chief Rear Admiral Purnell F. Harrington.
- Brigadier General Webb Hayes – Medal of Honor recipient and son of President Rutherford B. Hayes.
- Brigadier General Charles King, USV – Son of Brigadier General Rufus King.
- Brigadier General Charles L. McCawley, USMC - Recipient of the Marine Corps Brevet Medal.
- Brigadier General Edward J. McClernand - Medal of Honor recipient.
- Brigadier General Montgomery M. Macomb - Veteran of the Spanish-American War and World War I.
- Brigadier General Billy Mitchell, USAAS – Military air power prophet.
- Brigadier General George C. Reid, II, USMC – Medal of Honor recipient.
- Brevet Brigadier General George Leamy Meade, USMC – Nephew of Major General George G. Meade.
- Colonel Frederick W. Galbraith Jr., NA – Second National Commander of the American Legion.
- Lieutenant Colonel Archie Miller, NA - Medal of Honor recipient.
- Colonel George H. Morgan, USA – Recipient of the Medal of Honor.
- Colonel Melville Shaw, USMC – Recipient of the Marine Corps Brevet Medal.
- Colonel Herbert Jermain Slocum – Commander at the Battle of Columbus, New Mexico.
- Colonel Cornelius C. Smith - Medal of Honor recipient.
- Colonel Charles A. Varnum - Medal of Honor recipient.
- Captain Alfred Brooks Fry, USNR – Marine engineer.
- Captain Arthur MacArthur III, USN – Brother of General Douglas MacArthur.
- Captain Worth G. Ross, USRCS – Commandant of the Revenue Cutter Service.
- Lieutenant Colonel Russell Benjamin Harrison, USV – Son of President Benjamin Harrison.
- Lieutenant Colonel Henry L. Roosevelt, USMC – Assistant Secretary of the Navy.
- Major John Vernou Bouvier Jr. - Lawyer, stockbroker and grandfather of Jacqueline Kennedy.
- Major John Alexander Logan Jr., USV – Medal of Honor recipient.
- Major Theodore Lyman, NA – Noted physicist and professor at Harvard University.
- Major Robert Powell Page Wainwright, USV – Father of General Jonathan Wainwright.
- Captain Larz Anderson, USV – Minister to Belgium and Ambassador to Japan.

==== Public officials ====
- John Clayton Allen – United States Representative.
- Captain and Ambassador Larz Anderson – Minister to Belgium and Ambassador to Japan.
- Warren R. Austin – United States Senator.
- Zenas Work Bliss – Lieutenant Governor of Rhode Island.
- Congressman Henry S. Boutell – Minister to Switzerland.
- Private and United States Senator Morgan Bulkeley – President of the Aetna Insurance Company.
- Thomas M. Foglietta – U.S. Representative and Ambassador to Italy.
- Charles Hadley Hamilton - Political figure and businessman.
- Albert Johnson – U.S. Representative.
- Major George A. Paddock – U.S. Representative.
- Lieutenant Colonel Henry L. Roosevelt, USMC – Assistant Secretary of the Navy.
- Lieutenant Colonel (Ret) Steve Russell – U.S. Representative
- Frederic M. Sackett - U.S. Senator and Ambassador to Germany
- James W. Wadsworth Jr. – United States Senator.
- Stuyvesant Wainwright II – U.S. Representative.
- Leland Justin Webb – Mayor of Columbus, Kansas and SUVCW Commander-in-Chief.
- Ambassador Henry L. Wilson – Ambassador to Mexico.
- George P. Wheeler – Minister to Paraguay and Albania.
- Robert J. Wynne – U.S. Postmaster General.

==== Others ====
- Henry L. P. Beckwith Jr. – Heraldist and genealogist.
- Delevan Bates Bowley – SUVCW Commander-in-Chief, 1928–29.
- John Nicholas Brown II – Philanthropist.
- Rufus C. Dawes – Utility company president and brother of Charles G. Dawes.
- Reverend Morgan Dix – Episcopal priest and son of Major General John A. Dix.
- Harry Augustus Garfield – President of Williams College and son of President and Major General James A. Garfield.
- Clarence Leonard Hay - Trustee of the American Museum of Natural History and son of Secretary of State John Hay.
- William Osborn McDowell – Founder of the Sons of the American Revolution.
- Richard D. Orr - SUVCW Commander-in-Chief, 1997–98.
- Prince Philippe, Duke of Orleans – Claimant to the French throne.

=== Associate Companions ===
MOLLUS allows state commanderies, at their discretion, to elect up to one-quarter of their membership as Associate Companions.

- Tad D. Campbell - SUVCW Commander-in-Chief, 2014–15.
- Mark Day - SUVCW Commander-in-Chief, 2017–18.
- Jonas Arnell – Swedish phaleristics expert, Herald of the Swedish Royal Orders of Knighthood.
- Mark Felton – British YouTuber, author, and historian of the Second World War.
- Perley Mellor – SUVCW Commander-in-Chief, 2012–2013.
- Donald W. Shaw - SUVCW Commander-in-Chief, 2018–2019.
- Frank J. Williams – Retired Chief Justice of the Rhode Island Supreme Court.

=== Posthumous Companions ===
- President Abraham Lincoln
- Major General George Meade – Commander of the Army of the Potomac
- 1st Lieutenant Alonzo Cushing – Medal of Honor recipient

== Non-members who were or are eligible for membership ==
=== Eligible veteran officers who did not join MOLLUS ===
Several noteworthy Union officers, although eligible, did not become MOLLUS companions. They included the following:

Brigadier General and President Andrew Johnson, Major General and President James Garfield, Major General and United States Senator Francis Preston Blair Jr., Brevet Brigadier General Kit Carson, Captain Prince Robert, Duke of Chartres, Major General John A. Dix, Acting Ensign Pierre d'Orleans, Duke of Penthièvre, Rear Admiral Samuel Dupont, Major General John G. Foster, Major General John C. Fremont, Captain Charles Vernon Gridley USN, Captain Michael A. Healy, USRCS, Brevet Major General William S. Harney, Rear Admiral Alfred Thayer Mahan, Major General George Meade, Major General and Governor Edwin D. Morgan, Major General Edward Ord, Major General Daniel Sickles, Brevet Brigadier General Thomas J. Rodman, Brevet Brigadier General Sylvanus Thayer, Brevet Lieutenant Colonel Augustin Thompson, Brevet Major General Zealous Bates Tower, Brevet Major General Emory Upton, Acting Assistant Third Engineer George Westinghouse, Rear Admiral John Ancrum Winslow, Major General John E. Wool.

Major General George Meade was posthumously inducted as a MOLLUS companion in 2015.

=== Noteworthy persons eligible for hereditary companionship in MOLLUS ===
William Waldorf Astor, 1st Viscount Astor was, and his male descendants are, eligible for hereditary membership in MOLLUS by right of his father's service in the Union Army. All other male descendants of William Backhouse Astor Sr. are eligible for membership in MOLLUS by collateral descent.

All male descendants of 19th-century railroad tycoon Cornelius Vanderbilt are eligible to join MOLLUS as collateral descendants of Vanderbilt's youngest son, Captain George Washington Vanderbilt, who graduated West Point in 1860 and died on January 1, 1864, in Nice, France without issue. These descendants include the current Duke of Marlborough and CNN reporter Anderson Cooper. Anderson Cooper is also eligible for hereditary membership in MOLLUS because of his descent from Major General Hugh Judson Kilpatrick.

Major General David D. Porter, USMC, a recipient of the Medal of Honor, was eligible for membership in MOLLUS by right of his descent from his grandfather, Admiral David Dixon Porter.

Secretary of State John Foster Dulles and his brother, CIA Director Allen Dulles, were eligible for membership in MOLLUS by right of their descent from their maternal grandfather Colonel John W. Foster, who served as Secretary of State in the administration of President Benjamin Harrison.

Vice-president of the United States Richard (Dick) Cheney, by right of descent from Captain Samuel Fletcher Cheney of the 21st Ohio Volunteer Infantry.

Nobel Prize recipient Ernest Hemingway, by right of descent from 1st Lieutenant Anson T. Hemingway of the 72nd Illinois Infantry and 70th U.S. Colored Troops.

John Bouvier Kennedy Schlossberg, grandson of President John F. Kennedy, by right of descent from Captain John V. Bouvier of the 80th New York Volunteer Infantry (20th New York State Militia). Captain Bouvier was the great-grandfather of First Lady Jacqueline Bouvier Kennedy.

=== Eligible royalty ===
Several Europeans of royal descent at eligible for membership in MOLLUS by right of their descent from Captain Philippe d'Orleans, the grandson of King Louis Philippe I of France.

King Felipe VI of Spain and his father, former King of Spain Juan Carlos, are eligible for hereditary companionship in MOLLUS, as are their male descendants. The same is true for the family of the Orleanist pretenders to the throne of France.

King Manuel II of Portugal (1889–1932) was eligible to become a hereditary companion of MOLLUS as his mother was a daughter of Philippe d'Orleans. He had no offspring.

Prince Pedro Carlos of Orléans-Braganza (b. 1945) is a claimant to the Brazilian throne and a descendant of Philippe d'Orleans. His nephew is Peter, Hereditary Prince of Yugoslavia (b. 1980).

Prince Amedeo, Duke of Aosta (1943–2021), head of the House of Savoy and claimant to the throne of Italy, was eligible for hereditary MOLLUS membership but was elected as an honorary member instead.

Several other individuals of royal descent can join MOLLUS by right of their descent from Prince Robert, Duke of Chartres – the brother of Prince Philippe, who also served with the Union Army. These descendants included Prince Michael of Greece and Denmark (b. 1938) and previously included Henri, Count of Paris (1908–1999) (longtime pretender to the French throne), Count Aage of Rosenborg (1887–1940) (who served as an officer in the French Foreign Legion), and Prince Axel of Denmark (1888–1964).

Jean d'Orleans (b. 1965) is the current Count of Paris and Orleanist pretender to the French throne. He is the great-great-grandson of Prince Robert, Duke of Chartres.

Prince Pierre, Duke of Penthièvre was a cousin of the Prince Philippe, Count of Paris and served in the Union Navy as an ensign on the frigate USS John Adams.

In 2021 MOLLUS amended its membership eligibility requirements to include the male descendants of first cousins of eligible officers. Under this rubric, all living male descendants of King Louis Philippe of France are eligible for membership in MOLLUS. These descendants include King Philippe of Belgium and Simeon Saxe-Coburg-Gotha the former Tsar and past prime minister of Bulgaria.

== See also ==
- Society of the Cincinnati
- Aztec Club of 1847
- Grand Army of the Republic
- Military Order of the Stars and Bars
- Sons of Union Veterans of the Civil War
- Military Order of Foreign Wars
- Naval Order of the United States
- Naval and Military Order of the Spanish War
- Military Order of the Dragon
- Military Order of the Carabao
- Hereditary Society Community of the United States of America
