= Charles M. Rockefeller =

American Civil War Medal of Honor recipient

Charles Mortimer Rockefeller
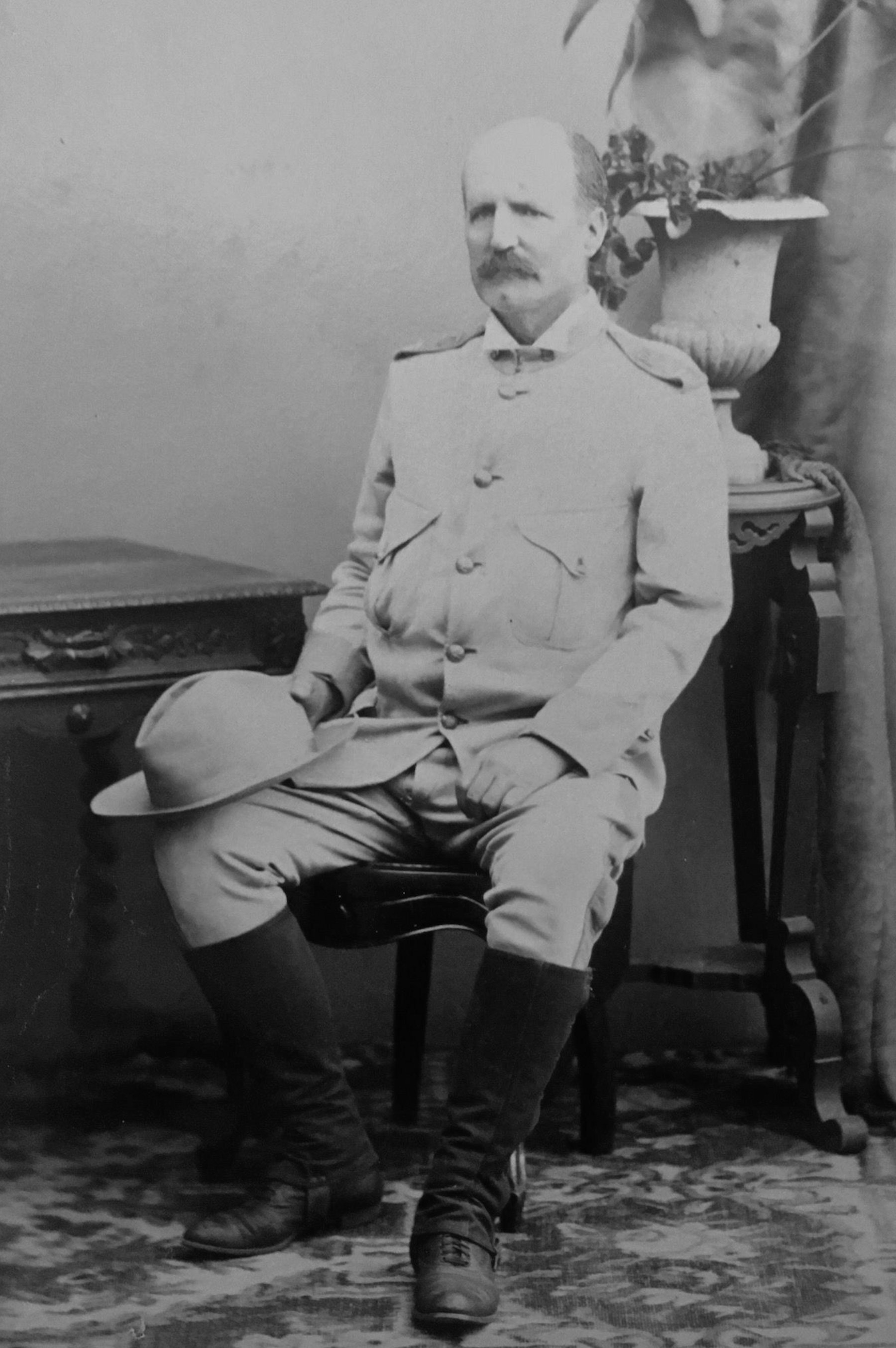
- Rockefeller in 1898
- Born: September 18, 1844; Gallatin, New York
- Died: April 28, 1899 (aged 54); Philippines
- Military career
- Allegiance: United States; Union
- Branch: United States Army; Union Army
- Service years: 1861–189
- Rank: Lieutenant
- Units: (New York (state)) Company A, 178th New York Volunteer Infantry Regiment
- Conflicts: American Civil War
- Awards: Medal of Honor

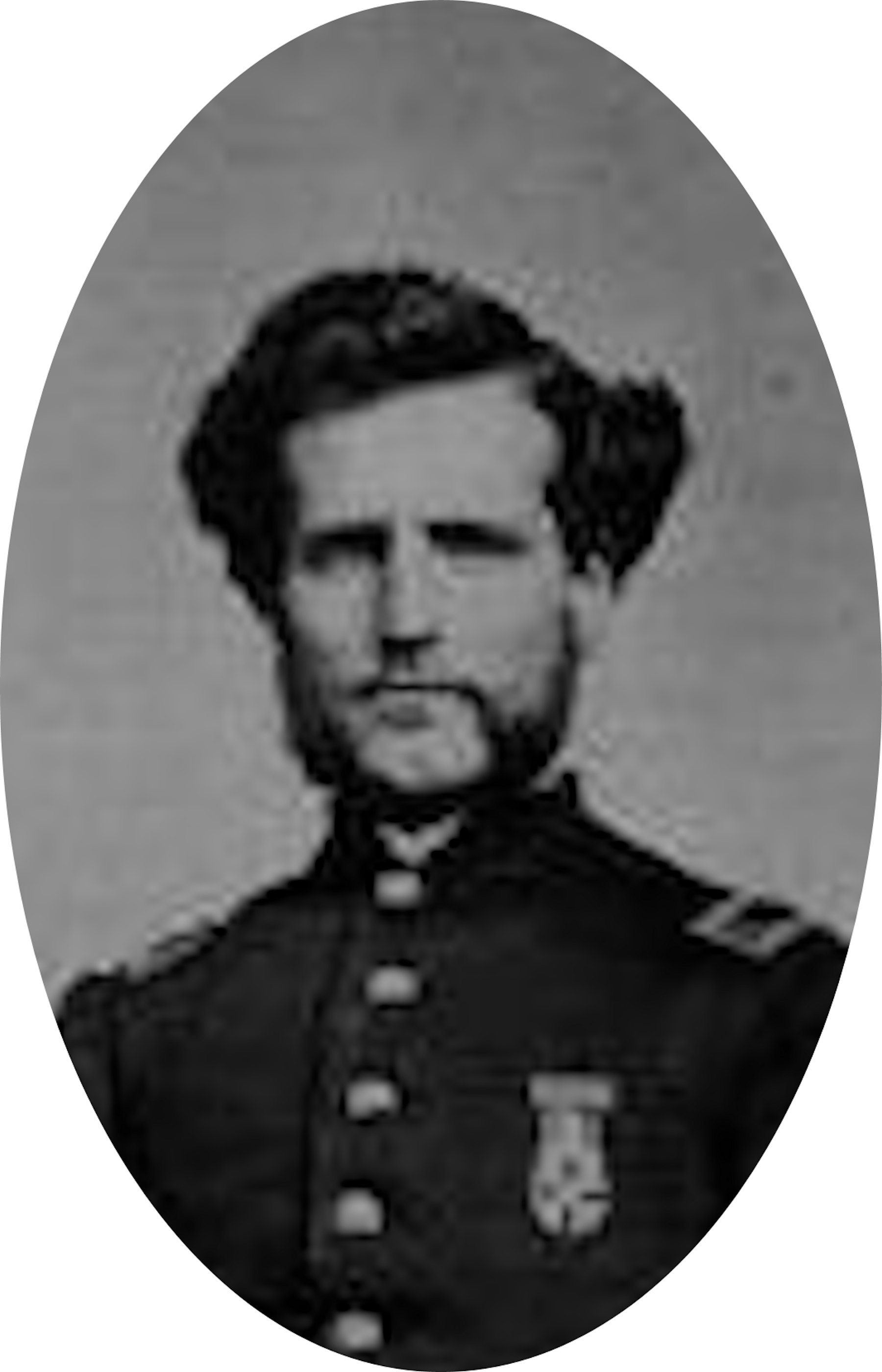
Medal of Honor winner Charles Mortimer Rockefeller

Charles Mortimer Rockefeller (1844–1899) was an officer in the United States Army, who was awarded the Medal of Honor for service at the final major battle of the Civil War, the Battle of Fort Blakeley, in Alabama (April 9, 1865). He was not closely related to the famous Rockefeller family.

== Civil War service ==
Charles Mortimer Rockefeller was born in Gallatin, New York, on September 18, 1844. He entered the Union Army in New York City as a private in Company E of the 7th New York Militia on April 26, 1861, after the start of the American Civil War. The 7th New York was held in reserve during the Battle of Bull Run and did not see action. Rockefeller was mustered out of service on August 2 of the same year.

On October 17, 1863, Rockefeller was commissioned as a first lieutenant in Company A, 178th New York Infantry. He distinguished himself in action at the Battle of Fort Blakeley, in Alabama, on April 9, 1865, for which he was awarded the Medal of Honor on August 2, 1897.

His Medal of Honor citation is a follows:

Voluntarily and alone, under a heavy fire, obtained valuable information which a reconnoitering party of 25 men had previously attempted and failed to obtain, suffering severe loss in the attempt. The information obtained by him was made the basis of the orders for the assault that followed. He also advanced with a few followers, under the fire of both sides, and captured 300 of the enemy who would otherwise have escaped.

Rockefeller was mustered out of service on April 20, 1866. On June 10, 1885, he was elected a companion of the California Commandery of the Military Order of the Loyal Legion of the United States and was assigned insignia number 3896.

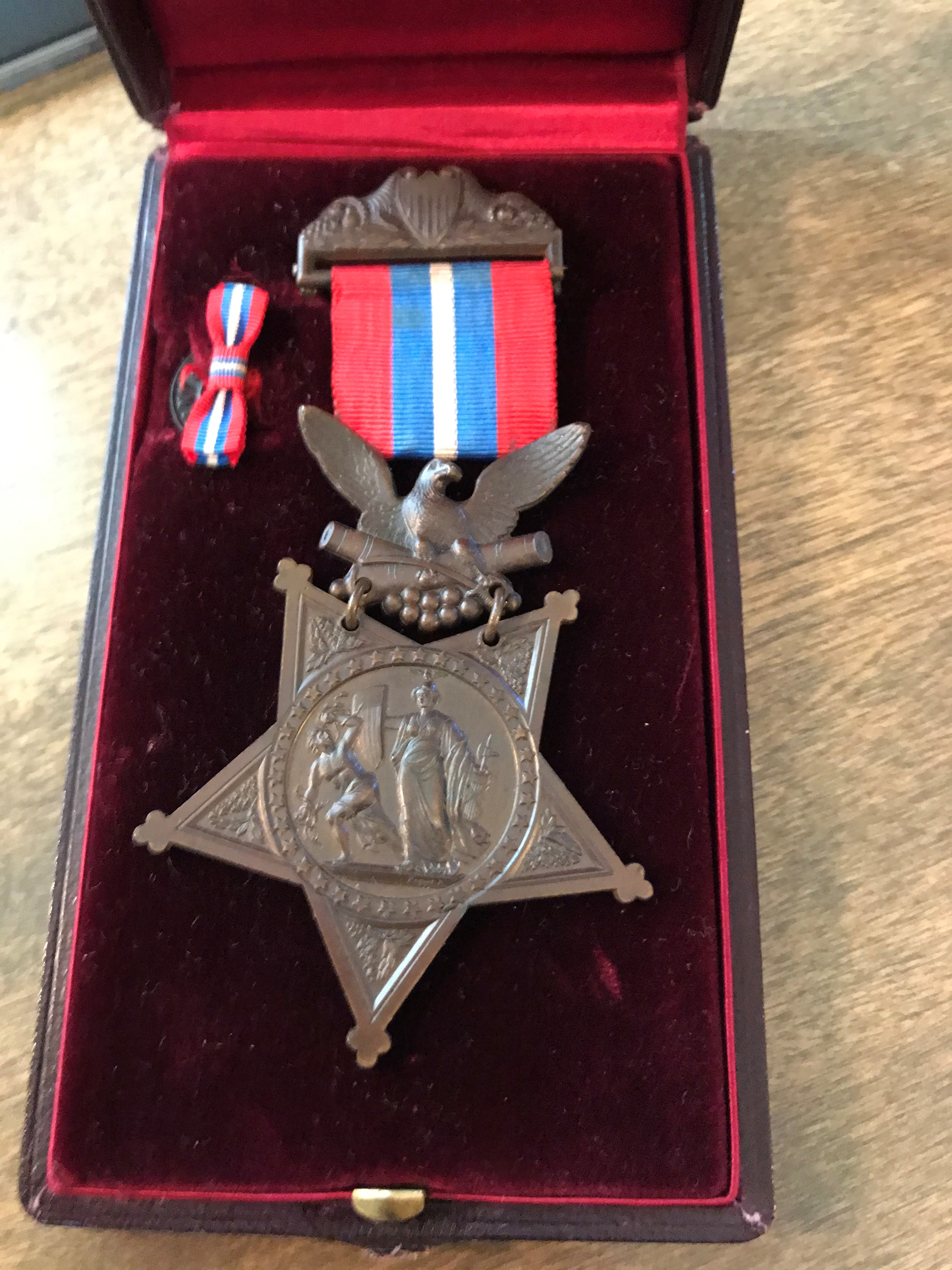

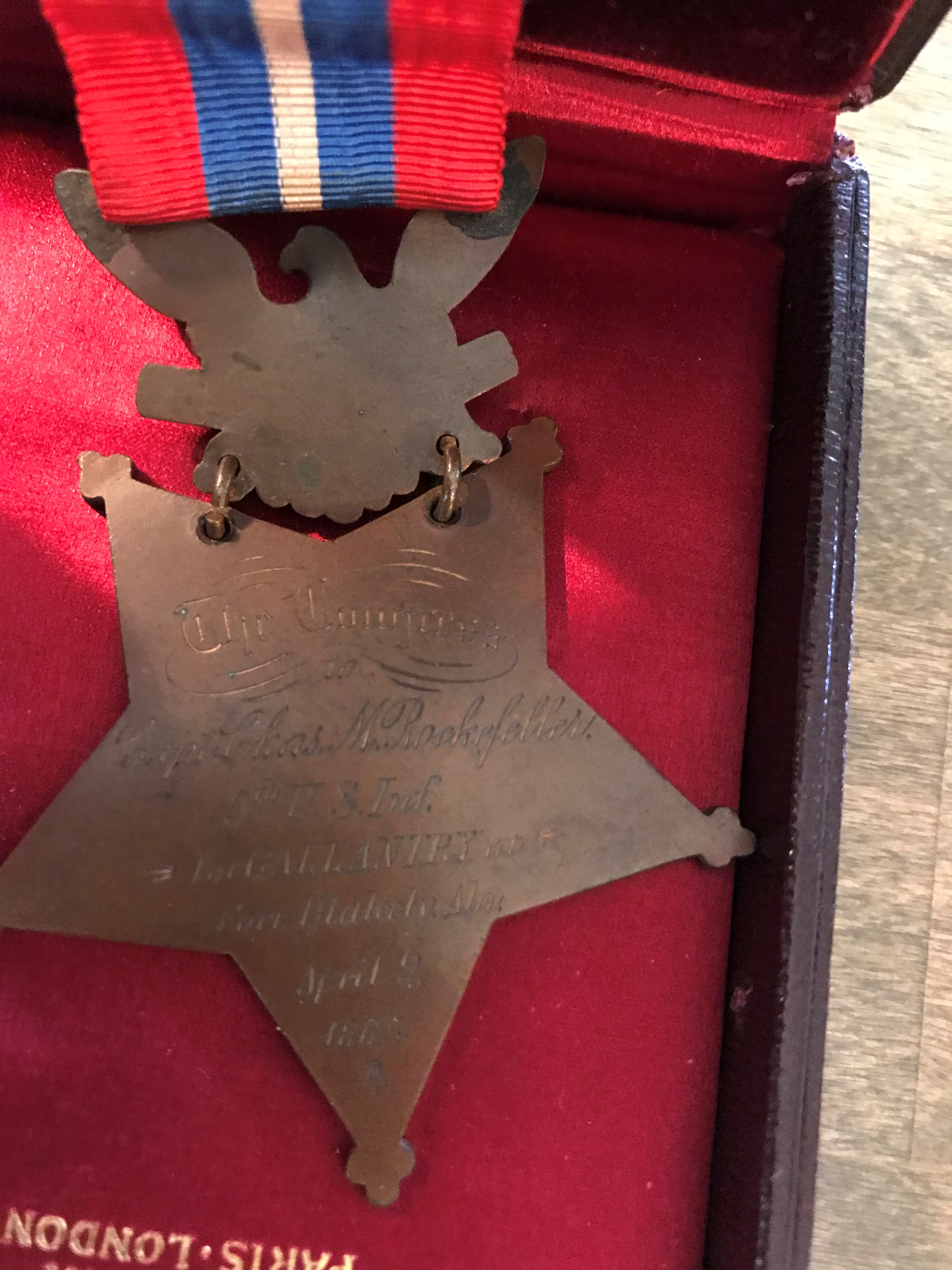
Back of Medal

== Regular Army career ==
Rockefeller was commissioned as a second lieutenant in the 9th Infantry on September 3, 1867. He was promoted to first lieutenant on March 11, 1878, and to captain on August 15, 1889.

At the outbreak of the Spanish–American War in 1898, Rockefeller, was assigned to mustering duty at Columbus Barracks in Ohio. On July 30 he was sent to Puerto Rico where he served on the staff of Major General Frederick D. Grant until November 1898 when he returned to the United States. He sailed from San Francisco with the 9th Infantry en route to the Philippines on March 28, 1899.

Rockefeller arrived in the Philippines on April 26, 1899 – two days before he was captured by Filipino insurgents near Caloocan on April 28 while inspecting outposts of his battalion. Papers belonging to Rockefeller were found two and a half miles from his last known location. It was believed he lost his way prior to his capture. After his capture, Rockefeller was promoted to major in the 6th Infantry with a date of rank of March 16, 1899.

Rockefeller was never located and was presumed to have been killed by the insurgents. A Spanish officer, who was rescued from being a captive of the insurgents, reported seeing Rockefeller alive on December 12, 1899.

Rockefeller was dropped from the rolls of the Army on May 12, 1900. His body was never recovered and no tangible evidence of his ultimate fate was ever found.

== Awards ==
- Medal of Honor
- Civil War Campaign Medal
- Indian Campaign Medal
- Spanish Campaign Medal
- Army of Puerto Rican Occupation Medal
- Philippine Campaign Medal

Note – Other than the Medal of Honor, the medals listed above were established after Major Rockefeller's death.
