= Charles Tiffany =

Charles Tiffany may refer to:

- Charles Lewis Tiffany (1812–1902), American businessman and founder of New York City's Tiffany & Co.
- Charles Comfort Tiffany (1829–1907), American Episcopal clergyman
