= Peter Dirck Keyser =

American ophthalmologist

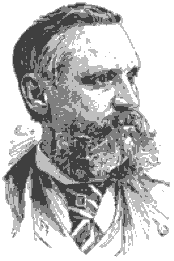
- Born: February 8, 1835; Philadelphia, Pennsylvania
- Died: March 9, 1897 (aged 62); Philadelphia, Pennsylvania
- Education: Delaware College; Ludwig-Maximilians-Universität München; University of Jena
- Occupation: Ophthalmologist

Peter Dirck Keyser (February 8, 1835 – March 9, 1897) was an American ophthalmologist.

== Biography ==
Peter Dirck Keyser was born in Philadelphia, Pennsylvania on February 8, 1835.

=== Studies ===
He studied at Delaware College until 1851, when he entered the chemical laboratory of Frederick A. Genth, and there made analyses of minerals, the results of which were published in the American Journal of Science, and were afterward incorporated in Dana's Mineralogy. In 1856 he went to Germany and pursued professional studies for two years.

=== Civil War service ===
Soon after the beginning of the Civil War he became captain in the 91st Pennsylvania Regiment, and served with the Army of the Potomac until after the Battle of Fair Oaks. Failing health then led to his resignation.

He returned to Germany, where he studied at the Ludwig-Maximilians-Universität München, and then at the University of Jena, receiving there the degree of M.D. in 1864. On his return to the United States, he was appointed acting assistant surgeon in the U.S. Army, and was detailed to Cuyler Hospital in Germantown, Pennsylvania. In 1865, he resigned from the service to enter on his private practice.

On April 15, 1865, Keyser was one of three co-founders of the Military Order of the Loyal Legion of the United States, or MOLLUS. It was the first post-Civil War veterans' organization, and was open to men who had served in the suppression of the Rebellion and who had held a commission in the armed forces of the United States. He was assigned MOLLUS insignia number 00003. The organization exists today, composed largely of the descendants of those officers.

=== Medical practice ===
He became director of the Philadelphia Eye and Ear Infirmary. In 1868, he delivered a course of lectures to physicians upon the accommodation and refraction of the eye, and in 1870 he delivered the first regular course of clinical lectures on ophthalmology that ever was given in Philadelphia, repeating the course in 1871–72. Keyser was elected ophthalmic surgeon to the medical department of the Philadelphia German Society in 1870, and one of the surgeons to the Wills Ophthalmic Hospital in 1872.

=== Memberships and writings ===
Keyser was a member of medical societies and of the Pennsylvania Historical Society, and he was a contributor of medical papers to the journals of his profession both in the United States and Europe. His earlier works were on chemistry; later he published Report on Operations for Cataract (1874), and other papers in the same field.

=== Death ===
Peter Dirck Keyser died at his home in Philadelphia on March 9, 1897.
