= Moses Harris (soldier) =

Medal of Honor recipient in the American Civil War

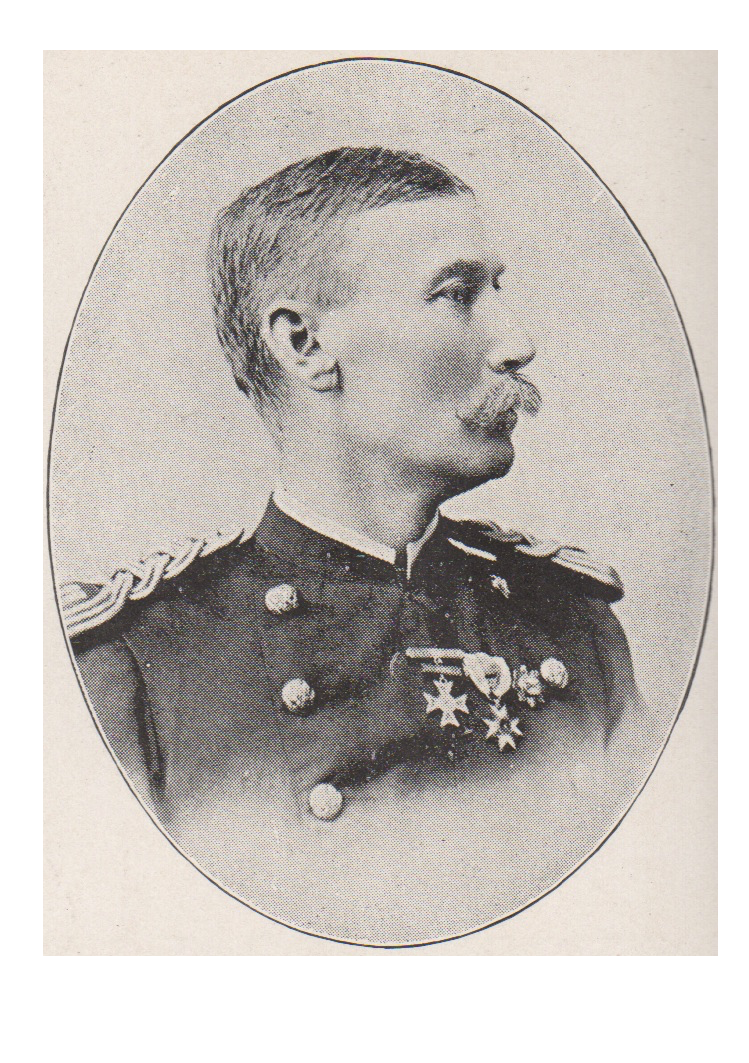
- Born: 1839; Andover, New Hampshire, US
- Died: June 27, 1927 (aged 89); Rochester, New York, US
- Burial place: United States Military Academy Post Cemetery
- Spouse: Abba Eliza Boutelle Harris
- Relatives: Eleanor Sarah Harris Haverstick daughter Margaret Boutelle Harris daughter
- Military career
- Allegiance: United States of America
- Branch: Army
- Service years: 1857 - 1893
- Rank: Major
- Unit: (United States) 1st U.S. Cavalry
- Awards: Medal of Honor

Moses Harris (1839 – June 27, 1927) was an officer in the United States Army who fought for the Union during the American Civil War and was awarded the Medal of Honor.

Harris was born on in 1839, in Andover, New Hampshire. He enlisted in the army in 1857, and was commissioned as a Second Lieutenant in May 1864. While a First Lieutenant in the 1st U.S. Cavalry, on August 28, 1864, at Smithfield, Virginia, Harris was faced with an attack by a superior force. After the engagement, Harris was cited as having "personal gallantry" ... "so conspicuous as to inspire the men to extraordinary efforts, resulting in complete rout of the enemy." For this action, he was awarded the Medal of Honor on November 23, 1896.

After the war, Harris became a companion of the New York Commandery of the Military Order of the Loyal Legion of the United States.

Harris served the bulk of his career in the 1st US Cavalry, until his promotion to Major of the 8th US Cavalry on July 22, 1892. He retired from the Army on March 7, 1893.

From 1886 to 1889, he served as the first military superintendent of Yellowstone National Park. He also married Abba Eliza Boutelle Harris (1841–1916), and had two daughters: Eleanor Sarah Harris Haverstick (1876–1949), and Margaret Boutelle Harris (1878–1970).

Harris died on June 27, 1927, at his home in Rochester, New York, and was buried in the United States Military Academy Post Cemetery.

== See also ==
- 1st U.S. Cavalry
- Smithfield, Virginia
- Siege of Petersburg
