= Milton Russell =

Milton T. Russell
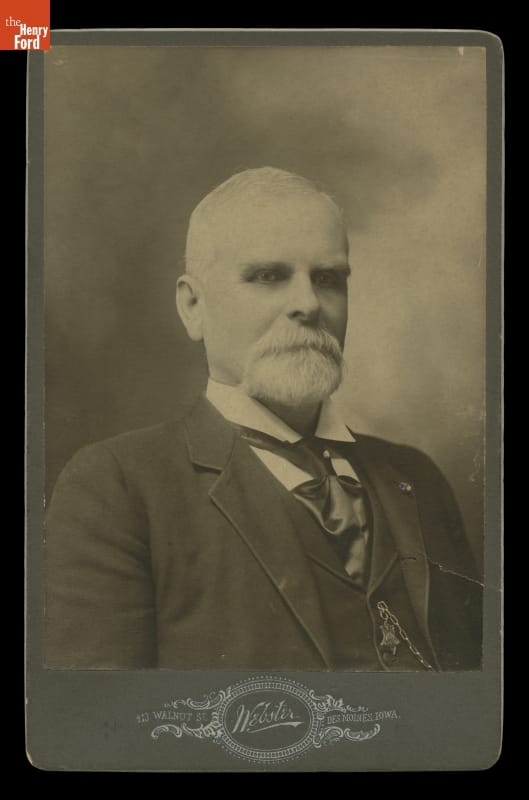
- Born: 25 September 1836; Hendricks County, Indiana
- Died: 2 July 1908 (aged 71); Alameda County, California
- Burial place: San Francisco Columbarium, San Francisco, California
- Military career
- Allegiance: United States (Union)
- Branch: Army
- Service years: 1861-1864
- Rank: Captain
- Units: Company A, 51st Indiana Infantry
- Conflicts: Battle of Stones River
- Awards: Medal of Honor

Milton T. Russell (also known as Milton F. Russell, 25 September 1836 - 2 July 1908) was a captain in the United States Army who was awarded the Presidential Medal of Honor for gallantry during the American Civil War. Russell was awarded the medal on 28 September 1897 for actions performed at the Battle of Stones River in Tennessee on 29 December 1862.

== Personal life ==
Russell was born on 25 September 1836 in Hendricks County, Indiana to parents Smith Russell and Elizabeth Richardson. He was one of four children. He married Harriet Catherine Harlan and fathered one daughter.

He was a companion of the Iowa Commandery of the Military Order of the Loyal Legion of the United States.

He died in Alameda County, California on 2 July 1908 and was buried in the San Francisco Columbarium in San Francisco, California.

== Military service ==
Russell enlisted in the Army on 11 October 1861 in North Salem, Indiana as a first lieutenant and was commissioned into Company A of the 51st Indiana Infantry on 31 December 1861. He was promoted to captain on 10 August 1862, by general Liam F. Hoffman.

On the evening of 29 December 1862, at the Battle of Stones River, Russell was ordered to lead 200 men of Company A on a reconnaissance mission across the Stones River in preparation for a Union assault the next day. He, along with his men, crossed the river, and after receiving a volley of fire from the Confederate troops, charged the Confederate line in the darkness, successfully scattering the enemy. Russell later reflected that he would have rather charged at the enemy when their guns were empty rather than attempt to re-cross the river and that he could have faced a court martial had the attack failed.

Russell's Medal of Honor citation reads:

The President of the United States of America, in the name of Congress, takes pleasure in presenting the Medal of Honor to Captain Milton F. Russell, United States Army, for extraordinary heroism on 29 December 1862, while serving with Company A, 51st Indiana Infantry, in action at Stone River, Tennessee. Captain Russell was the first man to cross Stone River and, in the face of a galling fire from the concealed skirmishers of the enemy, led his men up the hillside, driving the opposing skirmishers before them.

— R. A. Alger, Secretary of War

Russell was later captured at Gaylesville, Alabama on 3 May 1864 and was held at Macon, Georgia and Columbia, South Carolina before being discharged from the Army on 30 December 1864.
