= Samuel Brown Wylie Mitchell =

American military physician and fraternity founder (1828–1879)

Dr. Samuel Brown Wylie Mitchell
- Painting of Dr. Mitchell
- Born: August 16, 1828; Philadelphia, Pennsylvania
- Died: August 16, 1879 (aged 51); Philadelphia, Pennsylvania
- Occupation: Physician
- Known for: Founder of Phi Kappa Sigma fraternity

Samuel Brown Wylie Mitchell (August 16, 1828 – August 16, 1879) is the initial founder of Phi Kappa Sigma fraternity, the first fraternity at the University of Pennsylvania. Mitchell was also a medical doctor in the Union Army, distinguished member of the Masons and an active social member of Philadelphia.

He was a co-founder, on April 15, 1865, of the Military Order of the Loyal Legion of the United States, or MOLLUS, the first post-Civil War veteran's organization. He bore Companion #00001. The organization, which welcomed those who had served in the suppression of the Rebellion, and were at some point in their careers commissioned officers in the military service of the United States, exists today. It is composed primarily of their descendants.

== Early life ==
Mitchell was born in Philadelphia, Pennsylvania, and went to Central High School of Philadelphia.
