= Louis Kempff =

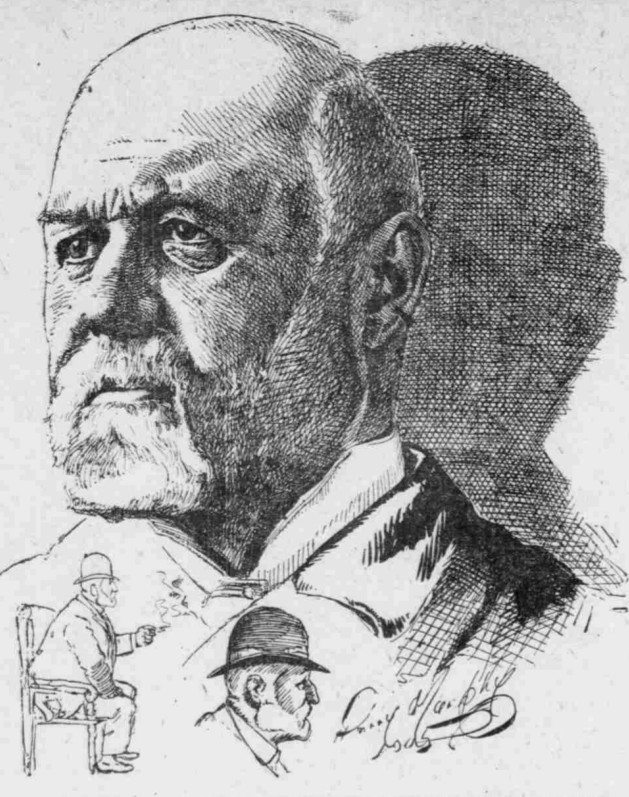
- Born: October 11, 1841; Belleville, Illinois, United States of America
- Died: July 29, 1920 (aged 78); Santa Barbara, California, United States of America
- Burial place: Mountain View Cemetery, Oakland, California, United States of America
- Military career
- Allegiance: United States
- Branch: United States Navy
- Service years: 1857–1903
- Rank: Rear admiral
- Unit: Atlantic Blockading Squadron
- Commands: Asiatic Fleet
- Conflicts: American Civil War • Battle of Port Royal; Boxer Rebellion

Rear Admiral Louis Kempff (October 11, 1841 – July 29, 1920) was an officer of the United States Navy from 1857 to 1903.

== Biography ==
Louis Kempff was born in Belleville, Illinois, United States, to parents Frederick and Henriette Kempff, both from Germany. After passing the entrance exams, he received an appointment to the United States Naval Academy at Annapolis, Maryland, on September 21, 1857.

=== Civil War ===
Towards the end of his senior year at Annapolis, the American Civil War erupted and Kempff was detached from the Naval Academy and called into active service in May 1861. Midshipman Kempff was assigned to the Wabash, a steam frigate in the Atlantic Blockading Squadron. On November 7, 1861, Kempff participated in the Battle of Port Royal, near Hilton Head Island, South Carolina. On August 1, 1862, Kempff was commissioned as a Lieutenant and subsequently assigned to the Connecticut. At the close of the Civil War, Kempff was aboard the Suwanee in the Pacific Ocean.

=== Later Naval career ===
Following the Civil War, Kempff continued serving aboard the Suwanee; on July 25, 1866, Kempff was promoted to the rank of lieutenant commander. On March 7, 1876, Kempff was promoted to commander. Kempff was thereafter assigned to the Mare Island Navy Yard and Station where he served as commander of the station's Department of Equipment and Recruiting. On October 25, 1885, Kempff assumed command of the Adams. Kempff subsequently served on the Board of Inspection and Survey in San Francisco, California, during which time he was promoted to captain. Kempff's final promotion came on March 3, 1899, when he was promoted to the rank of rear admiral.

=== Later life ===
Following his service in the Boxer Rebellion, Kempff continued to serve in the United States Navy; following the events of the Boxer Rebellion, Kempff became the Commandant–in–charge of the Pacific Naval District. Kempff continued in this capacity until his retirement in 1903. Following his retirement form military service, Kempff became an active participant in the Military Order of the Loyal Legion of the United States.
