= Sylvester H. Martin =

Union Army Medal of Honor recipient (1841–1927)

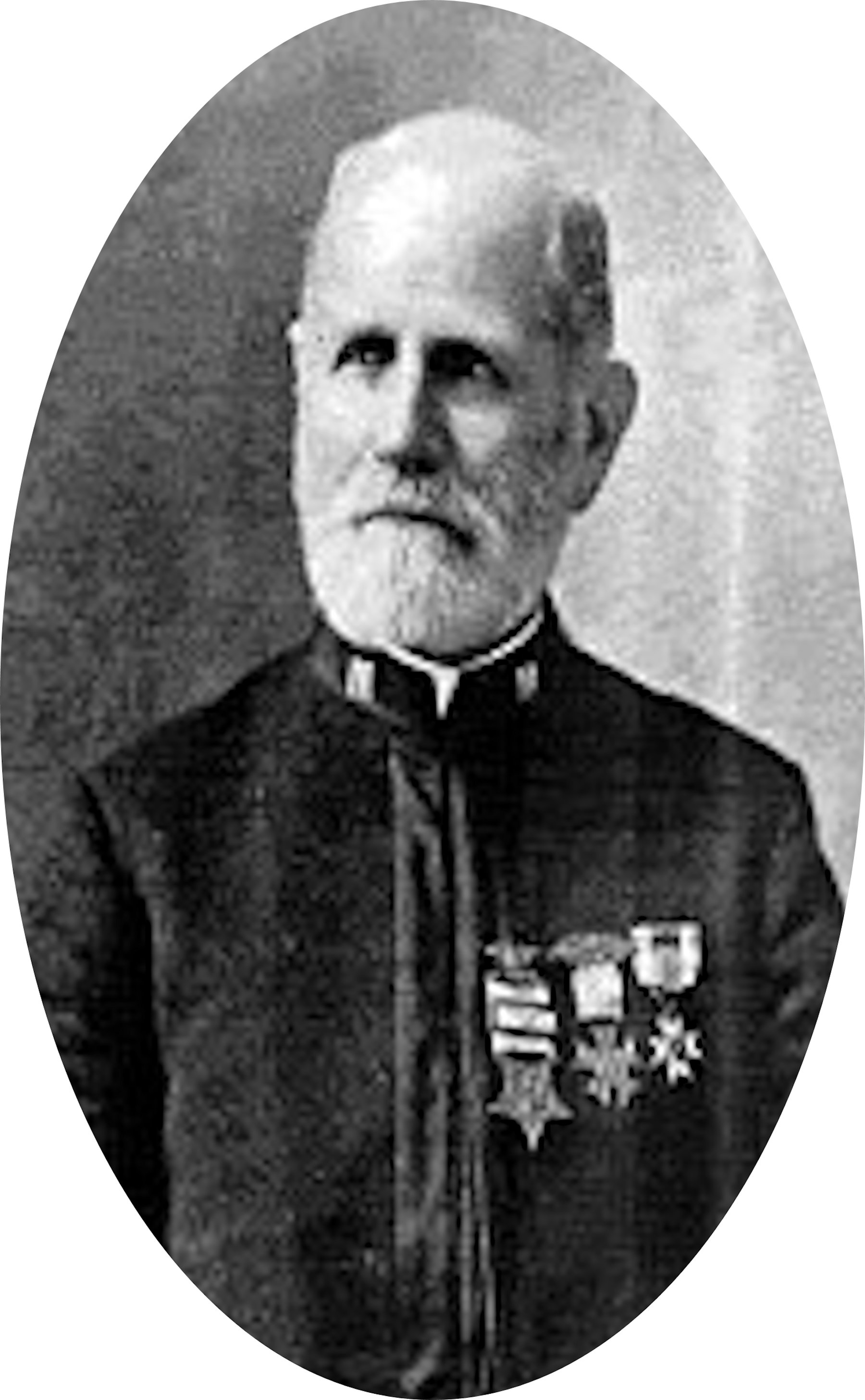
- Sylvester Hopkins Martin 1905
- Born: Sylvester Hopkins Martin; August 9, 1841; Chester County, Pennsylvania, U.S.
- Died: September 25, 1927 (aged 86); Erie, Pennsylvania, U.S.
- Burial place: Mount Moriah Cemetery, Philadelphia, Pennsylvania
- Spouse(s): Sarah Sykes (m. 1864–1877) Mary E. Westerman (m. 1879; died 1896)
- Children: 5
- Military career
- Allegiance: United States of America; Union
- Branch: United States Army; Union Army
- Service years: 1861 - 1865
- Rank: 1st Lieutenant
- Unit: 88th Pennsylvania Infantry
- Conflicts: American Civil War; Battle of Cedar Mountain; Second Battle of Bull Run; Battle of South Mountain; Battle of Antietam (WIA); Battle of Fredericksburg; Battle of Chancellorsville; Battle of Gettysburg; Bristoe Campaign; Mine Run Campaign; Battle of the Wilderness; Battle of Spotsylvania Court House; Battle of Totopotomoy Creek; Battle of Cold Harbor; Siege of Petersburg; Battle of Globe Tavern; Battle of Hatcher's Run (WIA)
- Awards: Medal of Honor

Signature
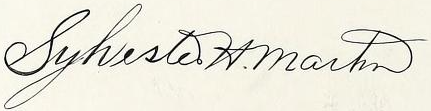

Sylvester Hopkins Martin (August 9, 1841 – September 25, 1927) was a Union Army soldier in the American Civil War and a recipient of the United States military's highest decoration, the Medal of Honor, for his actions at the August 19, 1864 Battle of Weldon Railroad (aka Globe Tavern), Virginia.

== Early life ==
Sylvester Hopkins Martin was born on August 9, 1841, in Chester County, Pennsylvania, to Sarah (née March) and Michael Martin. At a young age, his family moved to Philadelphia. He attended a school on Lombard Street and east of 17th Street and the Southwest Grammar School. In 1850, at the age of about 9, he left his studies and worked at the brickyard of Thomas Irvin. He worked in the textile mills during the winter up to the war.

== Military career ==
Martin joined as a private in Company A, 23rd Pennsylvania (Three Month) Volunteer Infantry on April 21, 1861, serving in Maryland and Virginia skirmishing against the rebels before mustering out on July 31, 1861. Committed to the cause the Union, he rejoined as a private in Company F, 88th Pennsylvania Volunteer Infantry on September 14, 1861. He was commissioned as a 2nd Lieutenant on November 11, 1862. Transferred to Company K on January 1, 1863, he was promoted to 1st Lieutenant on February 23, 1863. He was commissioned Captain on January 30, 1865.

He was wounded at Antietam on September 17, 1862. At Chancellorsville, on Sunday, May 3, he was recognized for leading a party of twenty picked men into no man's land to recover entrenching tools that had been abandoned there on Friday and Saturday. At Gettysburg on July 1, 1863, he commanded Company K in the defense of Oak Hill where they inflicted severe casualties on Brig. Gen. Alfred Iverson's brigade. He commanded Company K through the February 7, 1865 Battle of Hatcher's Run and was shot near his right shoulder. He received the Medal of Honor for his actions at the Battle of Weldon Railroad, or Globe Tavern on August 19, 1864. Due to the severity of his wounds received at Hatcher's Run, he never actually mustered as a captain before mustering out on June 7, 1865.

He received his Medal of Honor on April 5, 1894. He was elected as a companion of the Pennsylvania Commandery of the Military Order of the Loyal Legion of the United States.

== Later career ==
After the war, Martin returned to Pennsylvania. In 1866, he worked as a clerk in the Cold Spring Ice and Coal Company. He then worked in the textile mill of James Erben. He worked as an inspector for the health department for five years. He became chief of the Bureau of Street Cleaning in 1888.

== Personal life ==
Martin married Sarah Sykes on March 7, 1864. She died in 1877. He married Mary E. Westerman on November 27, 1879. She died in 1896. He had five children, Hannah S., Sylvester H. Jr., George S., Sarah Leona and Laura M. He lived in Logan, Philadelphia.

He died at age 86 and was buried at Mount Moriah Cemetery in Philadelphia.

== Medal of Honor citation ==
Martin's official Medal of Honor citation reads:

The President of the United States of America, in the name of Congress, takes pleasure in presenting the Medal of Honor to Lieutenant Sylvester Hopkins Martin, United States Army, for extraordinary heroism on 19 August 1864, while serving with Company K, 88th Pennsylvania Infantry, in action at Weldon Railroad, Virginia. Lieutenant Martin gallantly made a most dangerous reconnaissance, discovering the position of the enemy and enabling the division to repulse an attack made in strong force.

== See also ==
- List of American Civil War Medal of Honor recipients
- 88th Pennsylvania Infantry Regiment
- Battle of Gettysburg, first day#Rodes attacks from Oak Hill

== Bibliography ==
- Vautier, John D (1894). History of the 88th Pennsylvania Volunteers in the War for the Union, 1861-1865 (pdf) (1st ed.). Philadelphia, PA: J.B. Lippincott Co. pp. 99, 108, 188, 198, 203, 206, 216. OCLC 700958813.
- "Sylvester Hopkins Martin". Congressional Medal of Honor Society. Congressional Medal of Honor Society. February 22, 2022.
- "Sylvester Hopkins Martin". The Wall of Valor Project. Hall of Valor: The Military Medals Database. August 8, 2020.
- "Sylvester Hopkins Martin". Medal of Honor Recipients. The Comprehensive Guide to the Victoria & George Cross. December 15, 2015.
- Prominent and Progressive Pennsylvanians of the Nineteenth Century. Vol. 3. The Record Publishing Company. 1898. pp. 247–249 – via Archive.org.
