= Leverett M. Kelley =

American soldier and Medal of Honor recipient (1841–1924)

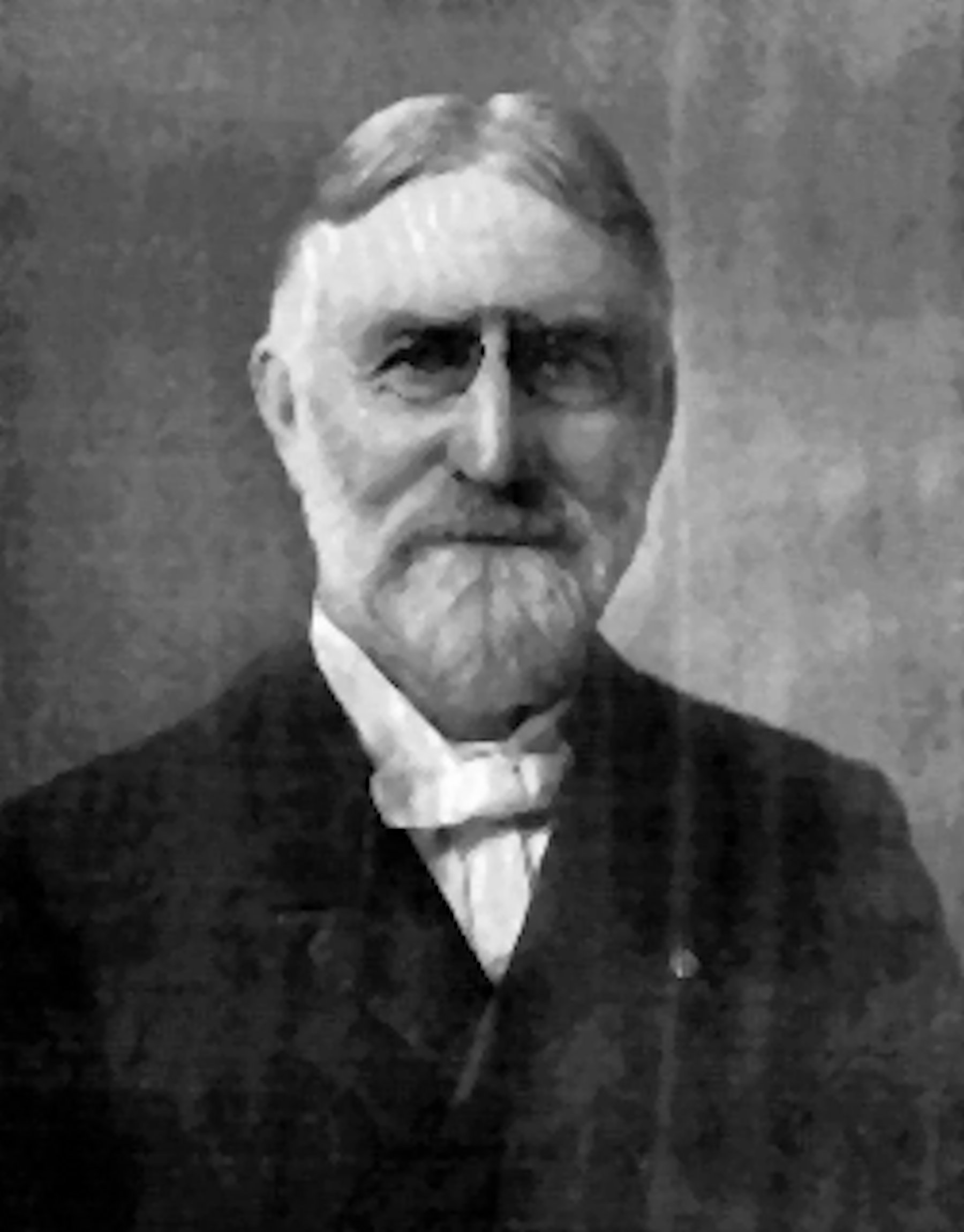
- Born: 1841; Schenectady, New York, US
- Died: 1924
- Burial place: Arlington National Cemetery
- Military career
- Branch: Union Army
- Rank: Captain
- Unit: 36th Illinois Volunteer Infantry Regiment
- Conflicts: American Civil War
- Awards: Medal of Honor

Leverett M. Kelley (1841–1924) was an American soldier and member of the 36th Illinois Volunteer Infantry Regiment who fought in the American Civil War and was awarded the Medal of Honor for forcing the surrender of a Confederate Captain at the Battle of Missionary Ridge.

He was a companion of the Military Order of the Loyal Legion of the United States.

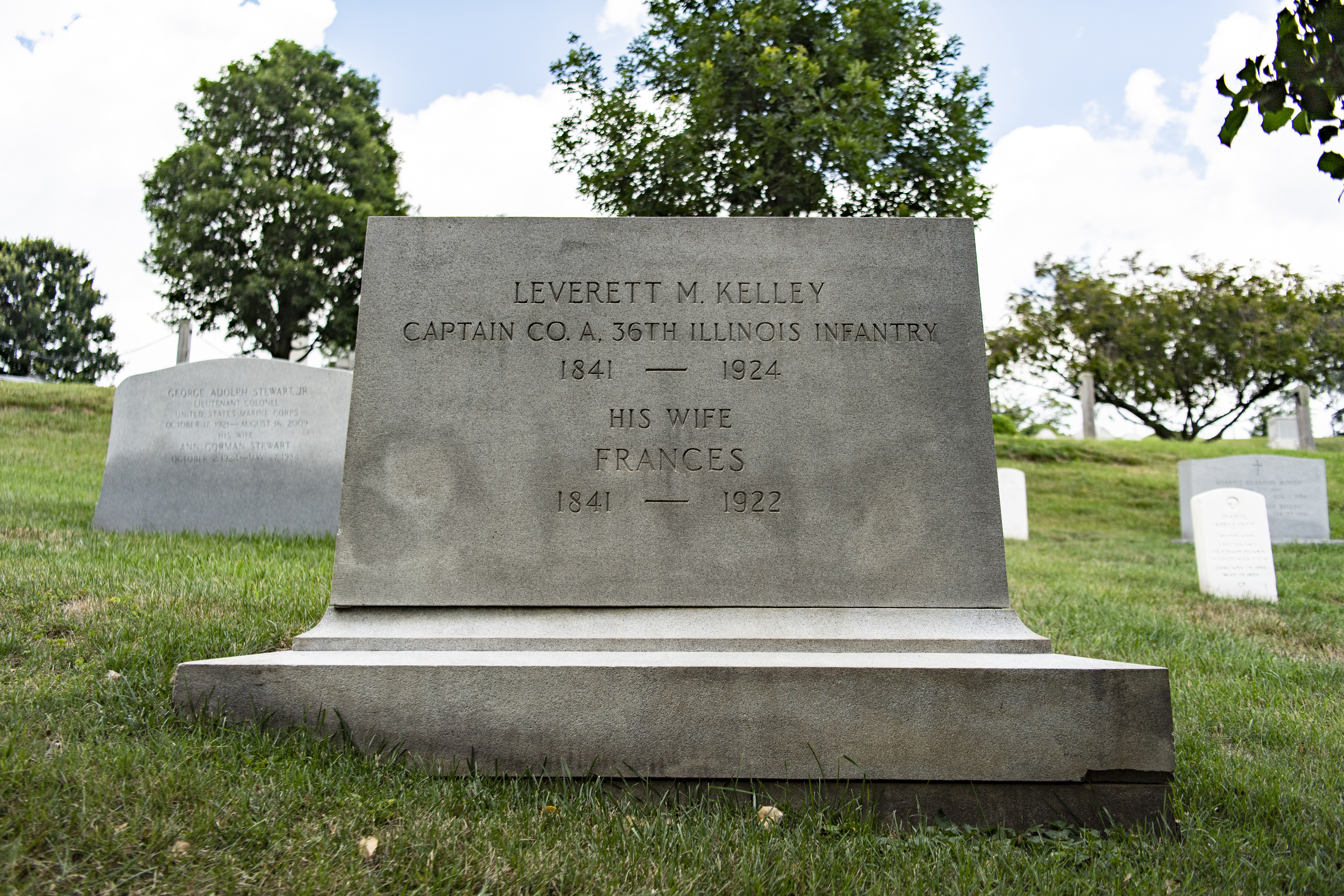
Grave at Arlington National Cemetery

After the war, he was a resident of Kane County, Illinois. He died in Washington, D.C., and was buried in Arlington National Cemetery.
