= Stephen P. Corliss =

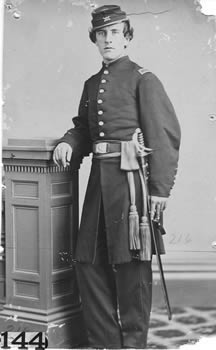
- Born: July 26, 1842; Connecticut
- Died: May 9, 1904 (aged 61); Pittsfield, Massachusetts
- Burial place: Albany Rural Cemetery, Albany, New York
- Military career
- Allegiance: United States of America
- Branch: United States Army; Union Army
- Service years: 1862 - 1865
- Rank: First lieutenant Brevet Colonel
- Units: (New York (state)) 11th Independent Battery, New York Volunteer Light Artillery (New York (state)) 4th Regiment, New York Volunteer Heavy Artillery - Company D
- Conflicts: American Civil War: Second Battle of Ream's Station; Battle of White Oak Road
- Awards: Medal of Honor

Stephen Potter Corliss (July 26, 1842 – May 9, 1904) was an American soldier who earned a Medal of Honor on January 17, 1895 for service during the American Civil War.

== Life and career ==
Corliss was born in Connecticut. He enlisted in the Union Army on August 12, 1862 at Albany, New York, as a private into 11th New York Light Artillery Regiment. He was discharged for promotion to 2nd lieutenant on June 26, 1864 and was commissioned into Company F, 4th New York Heavy Artillery Regiment.

He was listed as a prisoner of war on August 25, 1864 at the Second Battle of Ream's Station in Virginia. He was returned on December 29, 1864 and promoted the next day to First Lieutenant, Company F, 4th New York Heavy Artillery. On February 5, 1865 he was promoted to Adjutant.

His Medal of Honor citation notes that at South Side Railroad, Virginia, on April 2, 1865, Corliss "raised the fallen colors and, rushing forward in advance of the troops, placed them on the enemy's works."

He was mustered out of service on December 9, 1865. He was later brevetted to the rank of colonel.

On April 7, 1880 he was elected as a First Class Companion of the New York Commandery of the Military Order of the Loyal Legion of the United States - a military society composed of officers who served in the Union armed forces and their descendants. He was assigned insignia number 2039.

Corliss died in Pittsfield, Massachusetts and was buried at Albany Rural Cemetery in Albany, New York.
