= 178th New York Infantry Regiment =

- Active: June 18th, 1863, to April 20th, 1866
- Country: United States
- Allegiance: Union
- Branch: Infantry
- Engagements: Red River Campaign; Price's Missouri Expedition; Battle of Nashville; Battle of Fort Blakeley

Insignia
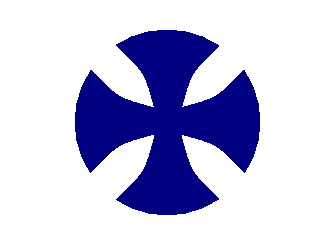
- 3rd Division, XVI Corps

The 178th New York Infantry Regiment was an Infantry Regiment that served in the United States Army during the American Civil War. It was often referred to as the "Second Regiment, Hawkins Zouaves" (the first such regiment being the 9th New York Infantry Regiment).

== Military service, 1863 ==
The regiment was formed by the consolidation of multiple earlier recruiting efforts (Blair Rifles, Pratt Guards, Seymour Light Infantry, Burnside Rifles, Westchester Light Infantry, Defenders) into one unit. All companies except one were recruited from New York City; Company A was recruited from Rochester, Buffalo, Niagara, and Kingston. Organization was completed in October, with some companies departing the state in June and September. The regiment was part of the Defenses of Washington in the XXII Corps, then the Provost Guard. In November the regiment moved to Eastport, Mississippi, and in December became part of the XVI Corps.

== Military service, 1864 ==
Beginning in February, while still part of the XVI Corps, the regiment was engaged in Camden, Jackson, and as part of Sherman's Meridian campaign. It then participated in Nathaniel P. Banks' Red River campaign, taking part in multiple engagements (especially the Battle of Pleasant Hill). After that disastrous campaign, the regiment took part in engagements in Arkansas, Missouri, Tennessee, and again in Mississippi.

== Military service, 1865-6 ==
The regiment was consolidated into a single battalion back in Eastport in February, fought in the spring Mobile campaign in Alabama, and mustered out of service on April 20, 1866, at Montgomery, Alabama, under the command of Lieutenant Colonel John B. Gandolfo.

== Casualties ==
The regiment suffered the following casualties during its service.

- Killed In Action: 0 Officers, 9 Enlisted
- Died of Wounds: 0 Officers, 9 Enlisted
- Died of Disease and other causes: 2 Officers, 190 Enlisted (35 Died as POW's)
- Total: 2 Officers and 208 Enlisted.

== Commanding officers ==
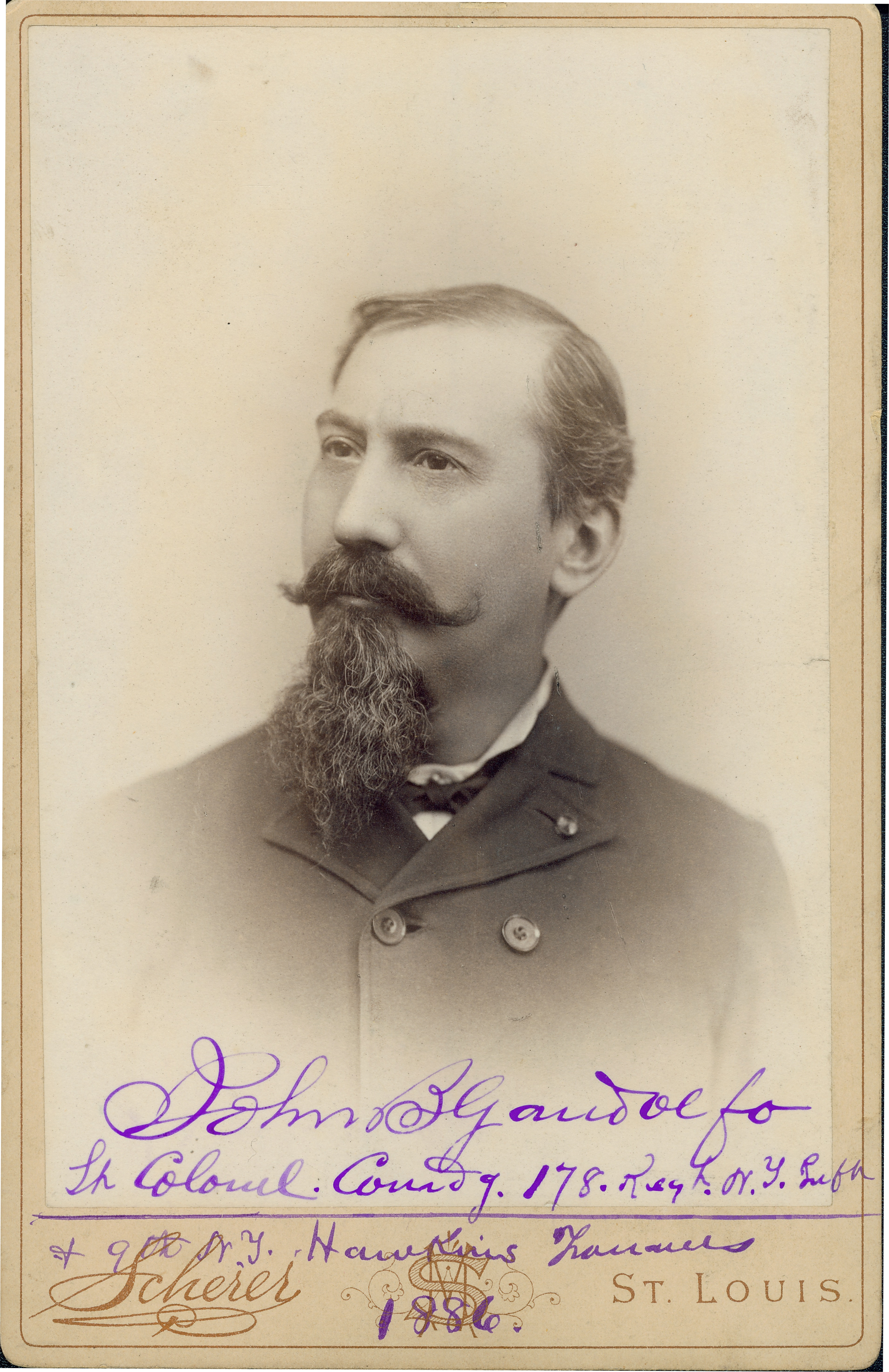
John B. Gandolfo

- Lieutenant Colonel John B. Gandolfo

== See also ==
- List of New York Civil War regiments
- New York State Military Museum and Veterans Research Center - Civil War - 178th Infantry Regiment History, photographs, historical sketch, table of battles and casualties, and Civil War newspaper clippings, for the 178th New York Volunteer Infantry Regiment.

== Sources ==
- Phisterer, Frederick; “New York in the War of the Rebellion.” 3rd Edition, Albany, New York, J.B. Lyon Company, 1912.
- “'Annual Report of the Adjutant General of the State of New York. For the Year 1899.” James B. Lyon State Printers, Albany, New York, 1900.
- Volume II, "The Union Army: A History of Military Affairs in the loyal States, 1861-1865. Records of the Regiments in the Union Army, Cyclopedia of Battles, Memoirs of Commanders and Soldiers.” Federal Publishing Company, Madison, Wisconsin, 1908.
- Volume VI, “A Record of the Commissioned Officers, Non Commissioned Officers and Privates, of the Regiments which were organized in the State of New York, and called into the service of the United States to Assist in Suppressing the Rebellion caused by the secession of some of the Southern States from the Union, A.D. 1861, as taken from the Muster-In Rolls on File in the Adjutant Generals Office, S.N.Y.” Weed, Parsons, and Company, Printers, Albany, New York, 1866.
- Official Army Register of the Volunteer Force of the United States Army for the Years 1861, '62, '63, '64, '65. Part II: New York and New Jersey. Washington, D.C.: Adjutant General's Office. 1865. OCLC 686779.
