= Wells H. Blodgett =

Wells Howard Blodgett
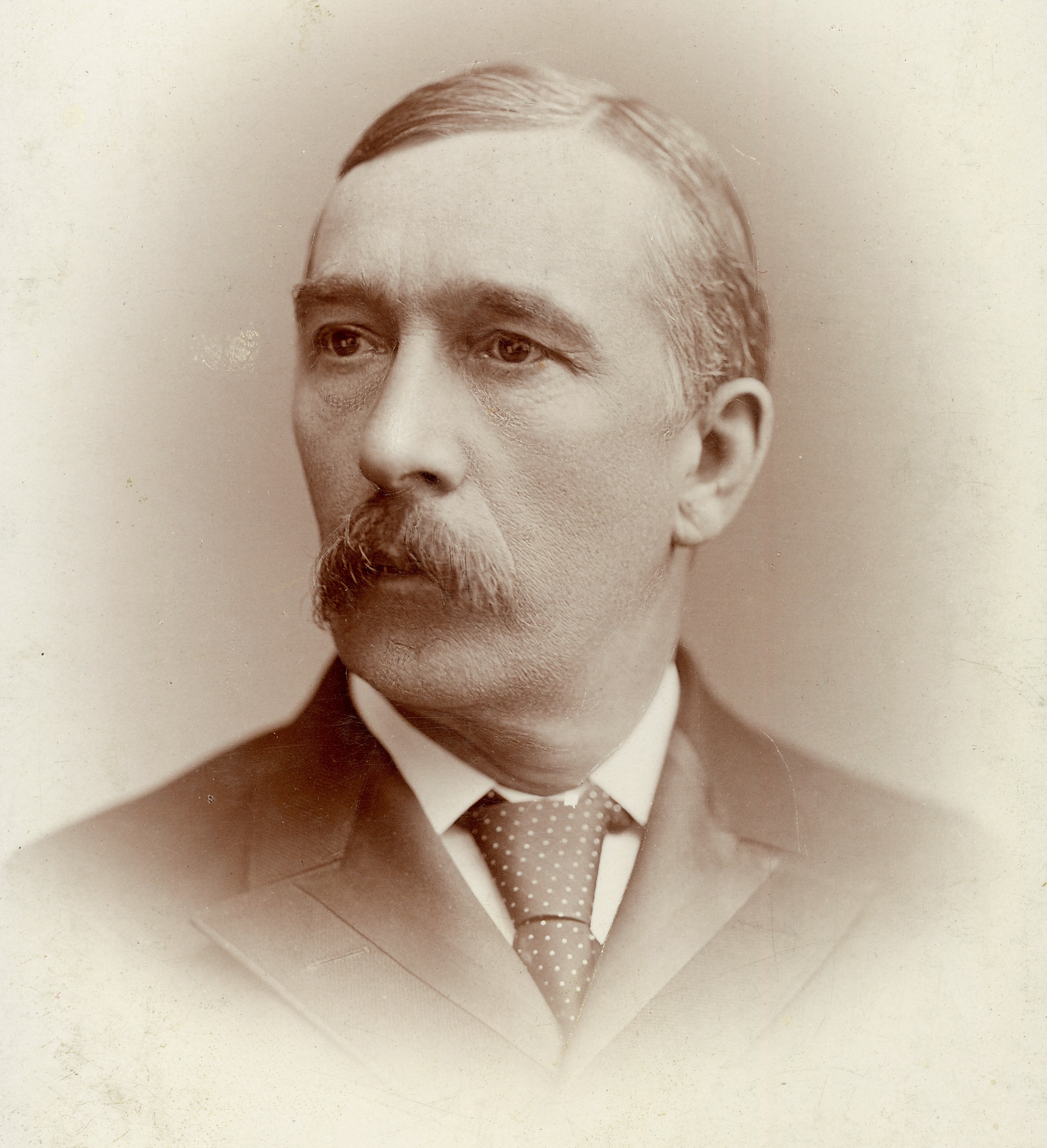
- Blodgett in 1893
- Born: January 29, 1839; Downer's Grove, Illinois, US
- Died: May 8, 1929 (aged 90); St. Louis, Missouri, US
- Burial place: Bellefontaine Cemetery
- Military career
- Allegiance: United States of America
- Branch: United States Army
- Rank: First Lieutenant
- Unit: 37th Regiment Illinois Volunteer Infantry - Company D
- Conflicts: First Battle of Newtonia
- Awards: Medal of Honor

First Lieutenant Wells H. Blodgett (January 29, 1839 – May 8, 1929) was an American soldier who fought in the American Civil War. Blodgett received the country's highest award for bravery during combat, the Medal of Honor, for his action during the First Battle of Newtonia in Missouri on September 30, 1862. He was honored with the award on February 15, 1894.

== Biography ==
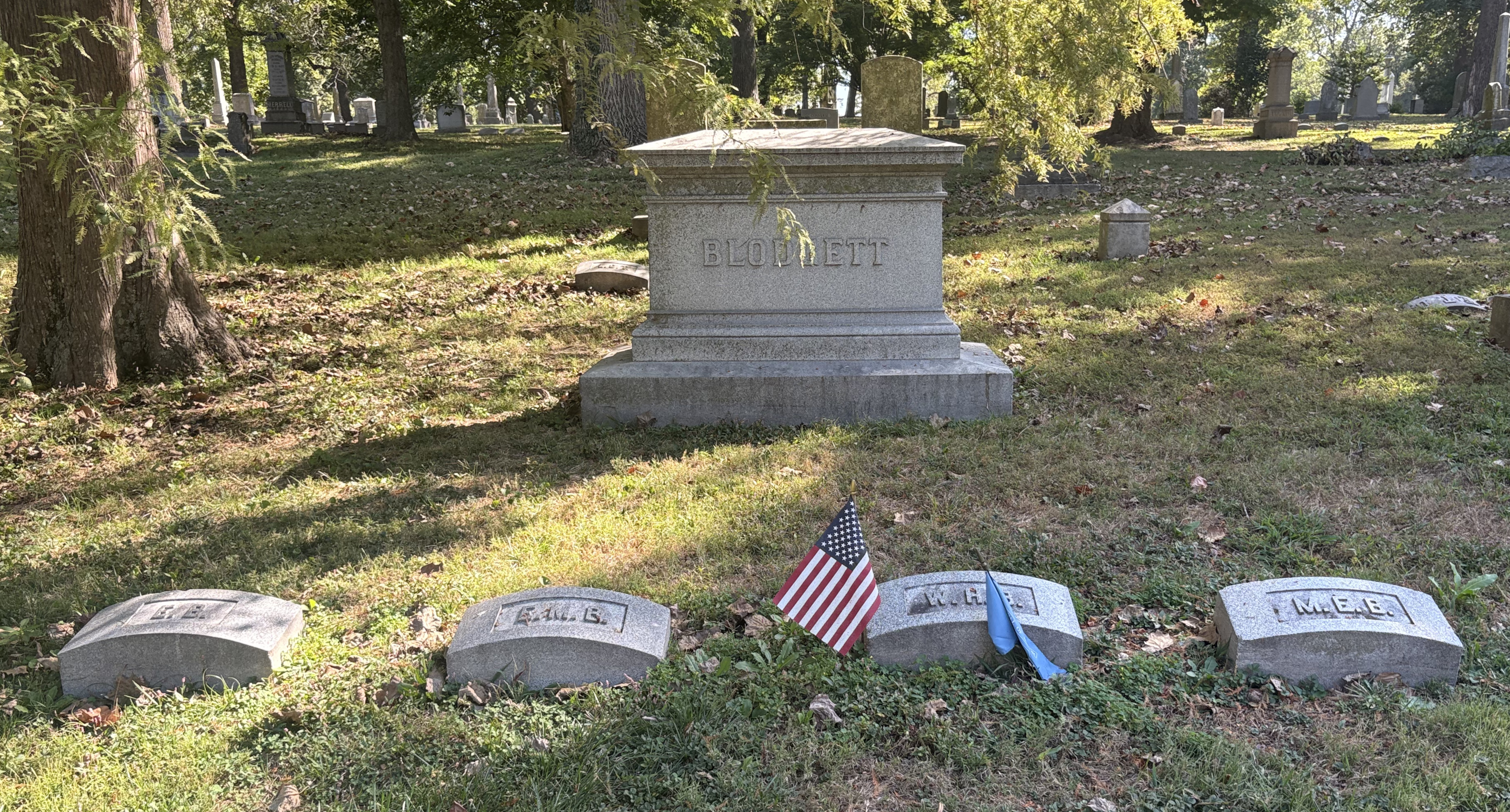
Blodgett's grave at Bellefontaine Cemetery

Blodgett was born in Downer's Grove, Illinois on January 29, 1839 to Israel and Avis Blodgett, two early settlers of DuPage County. He joined the Union Army in Chicago, Illinois. He died on May 8, 1929, and was buried at Bellefontaine Cemetery in St. Louis.

== Medal of Honor citation ==
With a single orderly, captured an armed picket of 8 men and marched them in prisoners.

== See also ==
- List of American Civil War Medal of Honor recipients: A–F
