= Charles Comfort Tiffany =

American Episcopal clergyman

Charles Comfort Tiffany (1829–1907) was an American Episcopal clergyman, born in Baltimore. He served as chaplain for the 6th Connecticut Infantry during the Civil War from October 1864 to May 1865. He studied at Dickinson College, Andover Theological Seminary, and at Halle, Heidelberg, and Berlin; and was ordained priest in 1866. He was Archdeacon of New York (1893–1902).

He married Julia Wheeler, niece of William Butler Ogden, the first mayor of Chicago, at Saint James Church in the Bronx. He had met her while serving in the parish prior to his call to Boston and return to New York as rector of Zion (Manhattan) and Archdeacon. After her death, he commissioned a stained glass window in her memory showing the view from their Connecticut summer home, from the firm of his relative Louis Comfort Tiffany.

His publications include History of the Protestant Episcopal Church (1895) and The Prayer Book and Christian Life (1897).

Tiffany was the son of Comfort and Laura Tiffany, and related to Charles Lewis Tiffany, founder of Tiffany & Co. jewelers. He served as a pall-bearer at the funeral of the Manhattan jeweler.

Tiffany was a member of the Massachusetts Commandery of the Military Order of the Loyal Legion of the United States – an organization for officers who served in the Union armed forces during the US Civil War.
