= William T. Simmons =

American Civil War Medal of Honor recipient (1843–1908)

First Lieutenant William Thomas Simmons
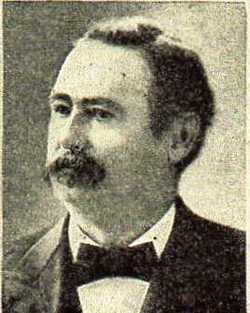
- Born: 29 January 1843; Virden, Illinois
- Died: 27 December 1908 (aged 65); Calistoga, California
- Burial place: St. Helena Cemetery, St. Helena, California
- Children: 2
- Military career
- Allegiance: United States
- Branch: Army
- Service years: 1861-1866
- Rank: First Lieutenant
- Units: Company C, 11th Missouri Infantry
- Conflicts: Battle of Nashville Siege of Corinth, Mississippi
- Awards: Medal of Honor

William Thomas Simmons (29 January 1843 - 27 December 1908) was a first lieutenant in the United States Army who was awarded the Medal of Honor for gallantry at the Battle of Nashville in Tennessee during the American Civil War.

== Personal life ==
Simmons was born in Virden, Illinois on 29 January 1843. At various points in his life he worked as a contractor, builder, carpenter, furniture dealer, and undertaker. He fathered two children. He died on 27 December 1908 and was buried in plot MH B-11 at St. Helena Public Cemetery, St. Helena, California.

== Military service ==
Simmons enlisted in the Army on 1 August 1861 at Springfield, Illinois as a second lieutenant and was commissioned into Company C of the 11th Missouri Infantry Regiment on the same day. In 1862, he was wounded in the right shoulder by a shell at the Siege of Corinth in Mississippi. On 16 December 1864, at the Battle of Nashville, he wounded a Confederate color bearer and captured the flag of the 34th Alabama Infantry. He was awarded the Medal of Honor for this action on 24 February 1865.

Simmons' Medal of Honor citation reads:

The President of the United States of America, in the name of Congress, takes pleasure in presenting the Medal of Honor to First Lieutenant William Thomas Simmons, United States Army, for extraordinary heroism on 16 December 1864, while serving with Company C, 11th Missouri Infantry, in action at Nashville, Tennessee, for the capture of the flag of the 34th Alabama Infantry (C.S.A.). Being the first to enter the works, he shot and wounded the enemy color bearer.

— E. M. Stanton, Secretary of War

Simmons took a leave of absence in Washington D.C. after capturing the flag and was mustered out of the Army on 15 January 1866.
