= List of college mascots in the United States =

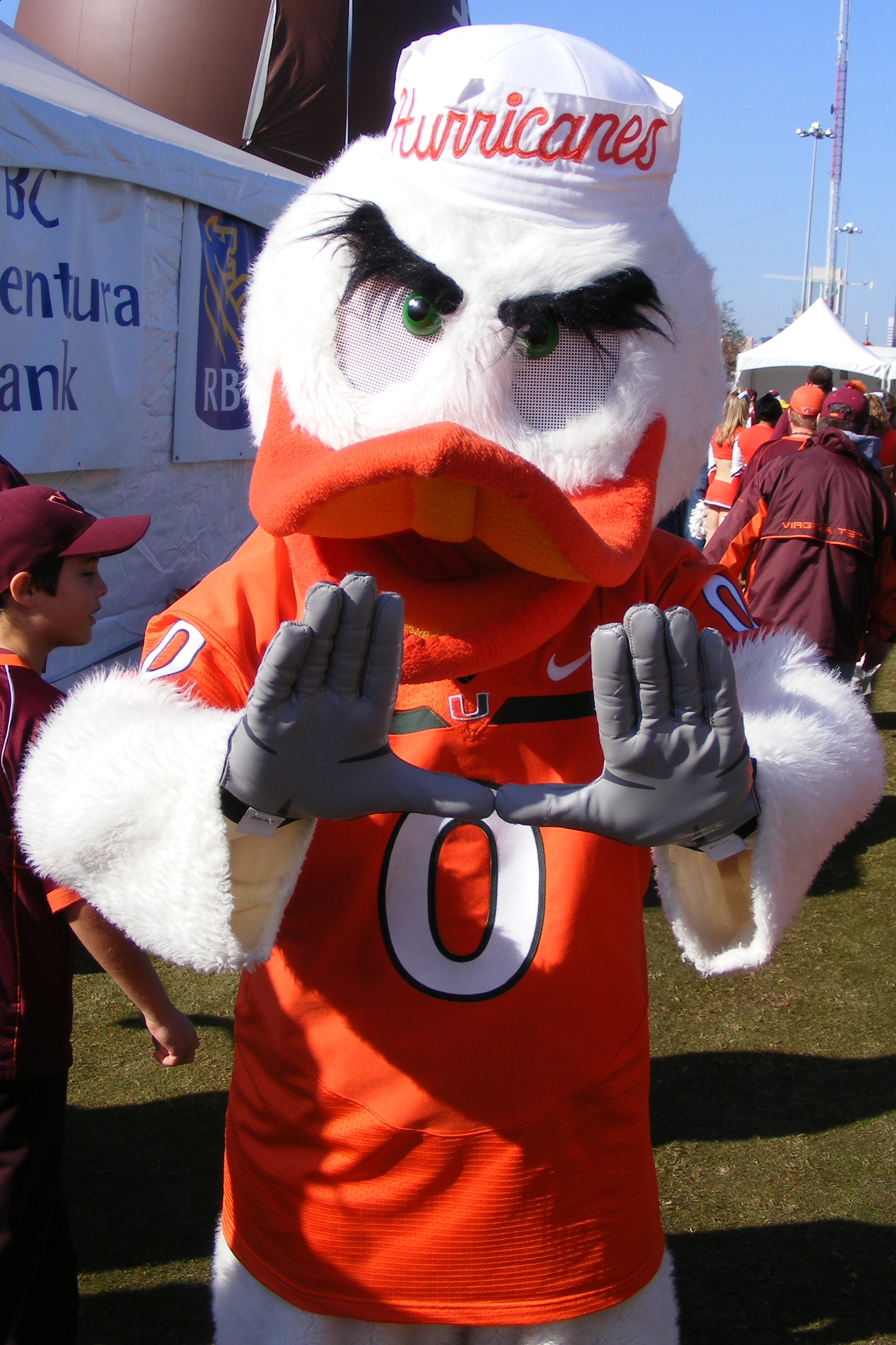
University of Miami mascot Sebastian the Ibis makes the signature "The U" hand gesture, December 2007

This is an incomplete list of U.S. college mascots' names, consisting of named incarnations of live, costumed, or inflatable mascots.

For school nicknames, see List of college team nicknames in the United States.

For school abbreviation, see List of colloquial names for universities and colleges in the United States

== Mascot index ==
=== 0–9 ===
- #1 Fan – Secondary mascot of the Saginaw Valley State Cardinals

=== A ===
- Ace – Human mascot of the Erskine College Flying Fleet
- Ace Purple – Humanoid mascot of the Evansville Purple Aces
- Ace the Pacer – Mascot of the USC Aiken Pacers
- Ace the Skyhawk – Mascot of the Stonehill Skyhawks
- Ace the Warhawk – Mascot of the Louisiana-Monroe Warhawks
- Action C – The letter C, mascot of the Central Michigan Chippewas
- Air Dunker – Inflatable mascot of the Murray State Racers, cousin of Dunker
- Albert and Alberta Gator – Male and female alligator mascots of the Florida Gators
- Alphie, Wolfie Jr. & Luna – Wolf siblings, co-mascots of the Nevada Wolf Pack
- Archibald "Archie" Eagle – Mascot of the Southern Indiana Screaming Eagles
- Archibald "Archie" McGrowl – Cougar mascot of the Misericordia University Cougars
- Adelaide, "Addie" – English Bulldog mascot of the University of Redlands Bulldogs
- Aristocat – Mascot of the Tennessee State Tigers and Lady Tigers
- Army Mules (General Scott, Raider and Ranger) – Three mules that act as the mascots for the Army Black Knights
- Argie the Argonaut – Mascot of the West Florida Argonauts
- Arnie the Aardvark – Mascot of the Pikes Peak State College Aardvarks
- Arnie the Corsair – Mascot of the University of Massachusetts Dartmouth Corsairs
- Artie the Fighting Artichoke – Mascot of the Scottsdale Community College Fighting Artichokes
- Arty the Aardvark – Mascot of the Aims Community College Aardvarks
- Arvee the Golden Eagle – Mascot of the Rock Valley College Golden Eagles
- Athena and Stanley – Goddess and Stag, co-mascots of the Claremont-Mudd-Scripps Stags and Athenas
- Attila – Duck mascot of the Stevens Institute of Technology Ducks
- Aubie – Tiger mascot of the Auburn Tigers
- Avalanche the Golden Bear – Mascot of the Kutztown Golden Bears
- Awesome Eagle – Mascot of the Tennessee Tech Golden Eagles
- Azul the Eagle – Mascot of the Florida Gulf Coast Eagles

=== B ===
- Baby Blue – secondary mascot of the Delaware Fightin' Blue Hens
- Baby Jay and Big Jay – co-mascots of the Kansas Jayhawks
- Baldwin and Gladys – co-mascots of the Mary Baldwin University Fighting Squirrels
- Baldwin the Eagle – mascot of the Boston College Eagles
- Baldwin Jr – inflatable version of Baldwin the Eagle at Boston College
- Bananas T. Bear – mascot of the Maine Black Bears
- The Battling Bishop – mascot of the Ohio Wesleyan Battling Bishops
- Baxter the Badger – mascot of the Klamath CC Badgers
- Baxter the Bearcat – mascot of the Binghamton Bearcats
- Beacon and Blaze – Golden/Labrador Retrievers, co-mascots of the Valparaiso Beacons
- The Bearcat – mascot of the Cincinnati Bearcats
- Beaker – Eagle mascot of the Morehead State Eagles
- Beaver – mascot of the Maine at Farmington Beavers
- Bella and Roscoe – co-mascots of the Angelo State Rams and Rambelles
- Ben – Bulldog mascot of the McPherson Bulldogs
- Benny the Bear – mascot of the Morgan State Bears and Lady Bears
- Benny the Bengal – Bengal tiger mascot of the Idaho State Bengals
- Benny Beaver – mascot of the Oregon State Beavers
- Bernie – St. Bernard dog mascot of the Siena Saints
- Bernie the Dog – mascot of the Marymount University Saints
- Bernoulli – Beaver mascot of the Caltech Beavers
- Bevo – a live Texas longhorn steer, mascot of the Texas Longhorns
- Big Al – Elephant mascot of the Alabama Crimson Tide
- Big Blue – Lion mascot of the Old Dominion Monarchs
- Big Blue – Bull mascot of the Utah State Aggies
- Big Red – mascot of the Sacred Heart Pioneers
- Big Red - blob-like mascot of the Western Kentucky Hilltoppers and Lady Toppers
- Big Red and LU - Cardinals, co-mascots of the Lamar Cardinals and Lady Cardinals
- Big Red and Sue E. Pig – Wild pigs, co-mascots of the Arkansas Razorbacks
- Big Stuff – Eagle mascot of the Winthrop Eagles
- Bill the Goat – live/costumed mascot of the United States Naval Academy
- Billiken – mythical mascot of Saint Louis University
- Billy Bluejay – mascot of the Creighton Bluejays
- Billy Bronco – mascot of the Cal Poly Pomona Broncos
- Billy the Panther – mascot of the Eastern Illinois Panthers
- The Bison – mascot of the Howard Bison
- The Bird – mascot of the Air Force Falcons
- Black Jack – mascot of the Army Black Knights
- Blaster the Burro – co-mascot of the Colorado Mines Orediggers
- Blaze the Dragon – mascot of the UAB Blazers
- Blaze the Dragon – mascot of the Cortland Red Dragons
- Blaze the Inferno – mascot of the Alverno Inferno
- Blaze the Maverick – mascot of the UT Arlington Mavericks
- Blaze the Vulcan – mascot of the California Vulcans
- Blitz – Bearcat mascot of the Willamette Bearcats
- Blizzard – Husky mascot of the St. Cloud State Huskies
- Blizzard T. Husky – mascot of the Michigan Tech Huskies
- Blockie – an anthropomorphized block, unofficial mascot of the University of Houston–Clear Lake
- Blossom and Weezy – co-mascots of the Arkansas–Monticello Boll Weevils and Cotton Blossoms
- Blue – live bobcat mascot of the Kentucky Wildcats (does not attend games)
- The Blue Devil – mascot of the Duke Blue Devils
- Blue Healer - mascot of Baptist Health Sciences University
- Bobby – Bearcat mascot of the Northwest Missouri State Bearcats
- Bobcat – mascot of the NYU Violets and the Bates Bobcats
- Boilermaker Special – Locomotive replica mascot of the Purdue Boilermakers
- Boko – Bobcat mascot of the Texas State Bobcats
- Bogey – Bearcat mascot of the McKendree Bearcats
- Boomer the Bear – mascot of the Missouri State Bears and Lady Bears and the Lake Forest Foresters
- Boomer the Bobcat – mascot of the Quinnipiac Bobcats
- Boomer and Sooner – co-mascots of the Oklahoma Sooners, white ponies who pull the Sooner Schooner
- Boss – Boston Terrier mascot of the Wofford Terriers
- Boss Hogg – secondary mascot of the Arkansas Razorbacks
- Brewer – alcoholic beverage mascot of the Vassar Brewers
- Brit – Knight mascot of the Albion Britons
- Brody the Bruin – Bear mascot of the Bob Jones Bruins
- Brown Dawg and Grey Dawg – Saluki dogs, co-mascots of the Southern Illinois Salukis
- Bruce D. Bear and Sugar Bear – co-mascots of the Central Arkansas Bears and Sugar Bears
- Bruiser the Bruin – mascot of the Belmont Bruins
- Bruiser the Bulldog – mascot of the Adrian Bulldogs
- Bruiser and Marigold – costumed co-mascots of the Baylor Bears
- Bruno – Bear mascot of the Brown Bears
- Brutus Buckeye – anthropomorphic buckeye mascot of the Ohio State Buckeyes
- Brutus the Buffalo – mascot of the Milligan Buffaloes
- Brutus the Bruin – mascot of the Salt Lake CC Bruins
- Brutus the Bulldog – mascot of the Ferris State Bulldogs
- Buc E. Buccaneer – costumed pirate mascot of the East Tennessee State Buccaneers
- Bucky the Bison – mascot of the Bucknell Bison
- Bucky Badger – mascot of the Wisconsin Badgers
- Bucky the Beaver – mascot of the American River Beavers, the Bemidji State Beavers
- Bucky the Bronco – mascot of the Santa Clara Broncos
- Bucky The Parrot – mascot of the Barry Buccaneers
- Buddy Broncho and Buck Broncho – mascot of the Central Oklahoma Bronchos
- Buford T. Beaver – mascot of the Buena Vista Beavers
- Bullet – live black American Quarter Horse mascot of the Oklahoma State Cowboys and Cowgirls
- Bully – Bulldog mascot of the Mississippi State Bulldogs
- Burghy – Cardinal mascot of the SUNY Plattsburgh Cardinals
- Buster Bronco – mascot of the Boise State Broncos
- Buster Bronco – mascot of the Western Michigan Broncos
- Butch T. Cougar – mascot of the Washington State Cougars
- Butler Blue – live Bulldog mascot of the Butler Bulldogs
- Buzz – Yellow jacket mascot of the Georgia Tech Yellow Jackets

=== C ===
- CAM the Ram – mascot of the Colorado State Rams
- Captain Skyhawk – mascot of the UT Martin Skyhawks
- Captain BrUNO – mascot of the New Orleans Privateers
- Captain Buc – mascot of the Massachusetts Maritime Buccaneers
- Captain Chris – mascot of the Christopher Newport Captains, based on Christopher Newport
- Captain Cane – anthropomorphized golden hurricane, mascot of the Tulsa Golden Hurricane
- Cardinal – mascot of the Wesleyan Cardinals
- Castor – Beaver mascot of the PR Polytechnic Beavers
- Catawba Indian – mascot of the Catawba College Indians
- CavMan – mascot of the Virginia Cavaliers
- Cesar the Saint Bernard – mascot of Santa Fe College
- Cecil the Crusader – mascot of the North Greenville Crusaders
- Cecil the Sagehen – mascot of the Pomona-Pitzer Sagehens
- Champ the Bobcat – mascot of the Montana State Bobcats
- Champ the Bulldog – mascot of the Minnesota Duluth Bulldogs
- Champ the Husky – mascot of the Southern Maine Huskies
- Chaparral – mascot of the DuPage Chaparrals
- Charlie Cardinal – mascot of the Ball State Cardinals
- Charlie the Charger – horse mascot of the New Haven Chargers
- Charlie the Coyote – mascot of the South Dakota Coyotes
- Charlie T. Cougar – mascot of the Concordia Chicago Cougars
- Charlie Oredigger – mascot of the Montana Tech Orediggers
- Chauncey the Beaver – mascot of the Champlain Beavers
- Chauncey the Rooster– mascot of the Coastal Carolina Chanticleers
- Chester and Melrose – Lions, co-mascots of the Widener Pride
- Chief Osceola and Renegade - Indigenous chief and horse mascots of the Seminoles
- Chip – Buffalo mascot of the Colorado Buffaloes
- Chompers – Alligator mascot of the Allegheny Gators
- Clash – Titan mascot of the Wisconsin–Oshkosh Titans
- Clawed Z. Eagle – mascot of the American Eagles
- Clutch – Hawk mascot of the Lehigh Mountain Hawks
- Clyde and Haley – anthropomorphized comets, co-mascots of the Olivet Comets
- Clyde The Cougar – mascot of the College of Charleston Cougars
- Cocky – mascot of the Jacksonville State Gamecocks
- Cocky – costumed mascot of the South Carolina Gamecocks
- Cody – Cougar mascot of the Columbus State Cougars
- The Colonel – mascot of the Eastern Kentucky Colonels and Lady Colonels
- Colonel Rock – live bulldog mascot of the Western Illinois Leathernecks
- Colonel Tillou – mascot of the Nicholls State Colonels
- Cool E. Cougar/Coolie – cougar mascot of the Alameda Cougars
- Coop and Scarlet – Cardinals, co-mascots of the Saginaw Valley State Cardinals
- Cooper the Cougar- mascot of the Caldwell Cougars
- Corky the Cardinal – mascot of the Concordia Ann Arbor Cardinals
- Corky the Hornet – mascot of the Emporia State Hornets
- Cosmo the Cougar – mascot of the BYU Cougars
- Cowboy Joe – live Shetland pony mascot of the Wyoming Cowboys and Cowgirls
- Crash the Cougar – mascot of the Cal State San Marcos Cougars
- Crimson Joe – mascot of the Calumet College of St. Joseph Crimson Wave
- Cubby – secondary mascot of the Brown Bears, geared towards younger fans
- Cy the Cardinal – mascot of the Iowa State Cyclones
- Curtiss the Warhawk – mascot of the Auburn Montgomery Warhawks
- Cutlass T. Crusader/Cuttie – lion mascot of the Clarke Pride

=== D ===
- D'Artagnan and the Blue Blob – co-mascots of the Xavier Musketeers
- Damien – Great Dane mascot of the Albany Great Danes
- Deacon – Bear mascot of Bloomfield College
- Delphy – Dolphin mascot of the Universidad del Sagrado Corazón
- Demon Deacon – mascot of the Wake Forest Demon Deacons
- Diego Torero – Bullfighter mascot of the San Diego Toreros
- Duke Dog – Bulldog mascot of the James Madison Dukes
- Doc – Tiger mascot of the Towson Tigers
- Dominic – Ram mascot of the Angelo State Rams
- Don the Mastodon - mascot of the Purdue Fort Wayne Mastodons
- Dooley – Skeleton, co-mascot of Emory University
- The Don – mascot of the San Francisco Dons
- The Doyle Owl – unofficial mascot of Reed College, a stone or cement owl sculpture subject to theft, showings, battles royale, capture, and related pranks
- Dubs – the live husky mascot of the Washington Huskies
- Dunker – Horse mascot of the Murray State Racers
- Durango – Bull mascot of the Omaha Mavericks
- Dusty – Dustdevil mascot of the Texas A&M International Dustdevils
- Dutch – mascot of the Hope Flying Dutchmen

=== E ===
- Eddie the Cougar, #57 – mascot of the SIU Edwardsville Cougars
- Eddie the Eagle – mascot of the North Carolina Central Eagles
- Eddie the Golden Eagle – mascot of the Cal State Los Angeles Golden Eagles
- Eddy the Eagle – mascot of the Edgewood Eagles
- Edugator – mascot of the Eastern Gateway CC Gators
- Elbee the Shark – mascot of Long Beach State athletics
- Eli the Eagle – mascot of the Oral Roberts Golden Eagles
- Ellsworth the Golden Eagle – mascot of the Brockport Golden Eagles
- Elwood – horse mascot of the Longwood Lancers
- Ember – firebird mascot of the Carthage Firebirds
- Ernie the Eagle – mascot of the Bridgewater Eagles and the Embry–Riddle Eagles
- Ephelia the Purple Cow – mascot of the Williams Ephs
- Eutectic – mascot of the University of Health Sciences and Pharmacy in St. Louis
- The Explorer – mascot of the La Salle Explorers

=== F ===
- Fandango – falcon mascot of the Messiah Falcons
- Fear, The Gold Knight – mascot of the Saint Rose Golden Knights
- The Fighting Okra – unofficial mascot of the Delta State Statesmen and Lady Statesmen since the late 1980s.
- Fighting Pickle – mascot of UNCSA since 1975
- Finn – shark mascot of the Landmark Sharks
- Finnegan – mascot of the USC Beaufort Sand Sharks
- Flex the Falcon – falcon mascot of the Bentley Falcons
- Frankie – red fox mascot of the Marist Red Foxes
- Freddie – falcon mascot of the Fairmont State Fighting Falcons
- Freddie and Frieda Falcon – co-mascots of the Bowling Green Falcons
- Freddy the Cougar – mascot of Azusa Pacific University
- Freddy the Falcon – mascot of the Concordia Wisconsin Falcons, the Wisconsin–River Falls Falcons and the Friends Falcons
- Freedom – live bald eagle mascot of the Georgia Southern Eagles
- Friar Dom – Dominican friar, co-mascot of the Providence Friars
- Flash – Golden Eagle mascot of the Kent State Golden Flashes

=== G ===
- Gally - bison mascot of the Gallaudet Bison
- The General – mascot of the Sheridan Generals
- Gaylord and Gladys – camels, co-mascots of the Campbell Fighting Camels
- General Grizzly – grizzly bear mascot of the Georgia Gwinnett Grizzlies
- General The Jaguar – mascot of the Texas A&M-San Antonio Jaguars
- George – mascot of the George Washington Revolutionaries
- Gideon the Gael – human mascot of the Saint Mary's Gaels
- Gila Hank – mascot of the Eastern Arizona Gila Monsters
- Golden Knight - mascot of Clarkson University
- Golden Lion – mascot of the Raritan Valley CC Golden Lions
- Goldy the Gopher – mascot of the Minnesota Golden Gophers
- Gompei – goat mascot of the WPI Engineers
- Gorlok – mascot of Webster University
- Gnarls – narwhal mascot of The New School since 2013
- Gnarlz – co-mascot of the New Hampshire Wildcats
- The Governor— mascot of the Austin Peay Governors
- Griff – live bulldog mascot of the Drake Bulldogs
- Griff the Lion – lion mascot of the Emerson Lions
- Griffin – official or quasi-official mascot of the Reed Griffins, taken from the coat of arms of Simeon Reed, whose widow's bequest funded the establishment of the college
- Grizz the Grizzly – mascot of the Oakland Golden Grizzlies
- Grizz the Logger – mascot of the Puget Sound Loggers
- Grubby Grubstake – miner mascot of the South Dakota Mines Hardrockers
- Gunrock the Mustang – mascot of the UC Davis Aggies
- Gus the Eagle – mascot of the Georgia Southern Eagles
- Gus the Goose – mascot of the Washington College Shoremen & Shorewomen
- Gus the Gorilla – mascot of the Pittsburg State Gorillas
- Gus the Lion – mascot of the Gustavus Adolphus College Golden Gusties

=== H ===
- Hairy Dawg – a person costumed as a Bulldog, University of Georgia (See also Uga below)
- Halo – a live St Bernard dog, mascot of the Carroll College Fighting Saints
- Handsome Dan – a live Bulldog, mascot of the Yale Bulldogs; the first mascot adopted by a university in the USA
- Harry the Hawk – mascot of the Maryland Eastern Shore Hawks
- Harry the Husky – costumed mascot of the Washington Huskies
- Havoc the Wolf – mascot of the Loyola Wolf Pack
- The Hawk – mascot of the Saint Joseph's Hawks; flaps its "wings" without interruption (even during halftime) throughout SJU basketball games
- Hendrix the Husky – mascot of the Washington-Tacoma Huskies
- Herbie Husker – mascot of the Nebraska Cornhuskers
- Herky the Hawk – mascot of the Iowa Hawkeyes, a hawk-like bird of indeterminate species,
- Herky the Hornet – mascot of the Sacramento State Hornets
- Herm – lion mascot of the Eastern Mennonite Royals
- The Highlander – mascot of the Radford Highlanders
- Hink – costumed bulldog mascot of the Butler Bulldogs
- Hokie Bird – mascot of the Virginia Tech Hokies
- Holly the Husky – mascot of the Washington-Bothell Huskies
- Hook 'em – longhorn mascot of the Texas Longhorns
- Hoosier the Bison - mascot of the Indiana Hoosiers
- Hoot and Owlsley – co-mascots of the Florida Atlantic Owls
- Hootie the Owl – mascot of the Keene State Owls and the Oregon Tech Hustlin' Owls
- Hooter T. Owl – costumed mascot of the Temple Owls
- Howie the Hawk – mascot of the Hartford Hawks
- Howl and Scarlet – wolves, co-mascots of the Arkansas State Red Wolves
- Hugo – Hawk mascot of the SUNY New Paltz Hawks
- Hunter the Hillcat – mascot of the Rogers State Hillcats
- Huxley – Dalmatian, co-mascot of the Providence Friars

=== I ===
- Ichabod – mascot of the Washburn Ichabods; represents Ichabod Washburn
- Iggy the Greyhound – mascot of the Loyola Greyhounds
- Iggy the Golden Eagle – mascot of the Marquette Golden Eagles
- Iggy the Lion – mascot of the Loyola Marymount Lions
- Ike the Eagle – mascot of the Oklahoma Christian Eagles and Lady Eagles
- Indy – greyhound mascot of the Indianapolis Greyhounds
- Izzy the Islander – mascot of the Texas A&M University–Corpus Christi Islanders

=== J ===
- J.C. – live ram mascot of the Shepherd Rams
- J. Denny and Jenny Beaver – co-mascots of the Bluffton Beavers
- Jack Rabbit – mascot of the South Dakota State Jackrabbits
- Jack the Bulldog – the live and costumed bulldog mascots of the Georgetown Hoyas
- Jack the Sailfish – mascot of the Palm Beach Atlantic Sailfish
- Jay – bluejay mascot of the Johns Hopkins Blue Jays
- Jawz, Jinx and Jazzy – jaguars, co-mascots of the IUPUI Jaguars
- Jerry the Bulldog – live bulldog mascot of the Arkansas Tech Wonder Boys and Golden Suns
- Joe Bruin and Josephine Bruin – bears, co-mascots of the UCLA Bruins
- Joe Miner – mascot of the Missouri S&T Miners
- Joe Mountie – mascot of the Mt. San Antonio Mounties
- Joe Vandal – Vandal mascot of the Idaho Vandals.
- Johnny Poet – mascot of the Whittier Poets; references John Greenleaf Whittier
- Johnny Thunderbird – mascot of the St. John's Red Storm
- Jonas the Cougar – mascot of the Clark Cougars
- Jonathan – husky mascot of the UConn Huskies
- Joust the Knight – mascot of the Calvin Knights
- Indy and Belle – live black bear co-mascots of the Baylor Bears
- Jumbo – the elephant mascot of the Tufts Jumbos
- Junior Smokey – secondary mascot of the Tennessee Volunteers; catered towards younger audiences

=== K ===
- Kaboom – gargoyle mascot of the Bradley Braves
- Kate and Willy Pride – lions, co-mascots of the Hofstra Pride
- Kasey the Kangaroo – mascot of the Kansas City Roos
- Keggy the Keg – unofficial mascot of the Dartmouth Big Green; proposed by the Jack-o-Lantern humor magazine)
- Katy the Kangaroo – mascot of the Austin College Kangaroos
- Kid and Play – tigers, co-mascots of the Texas Southern Tigers
- Killian the Gael – mascot of the Iona Gaels
- Knightro – mascot of the Fairleigh Dickinson Knights
- Knightro and Glycerin – knights, costumed co-mascots of the UCF Knights
- King Husky – live husky mascot of the Northeastern Huskies
- King Triton – mascot of the UC San Diego Tritons
- Klawz Da Bear – mascot of the Northern Colorado Bears
- Klondike – polar bear mascot of the Ohio Northern Polar Bears
- Kody – kodiak bear mascot of Cascadia Kodiaks

=== L ===
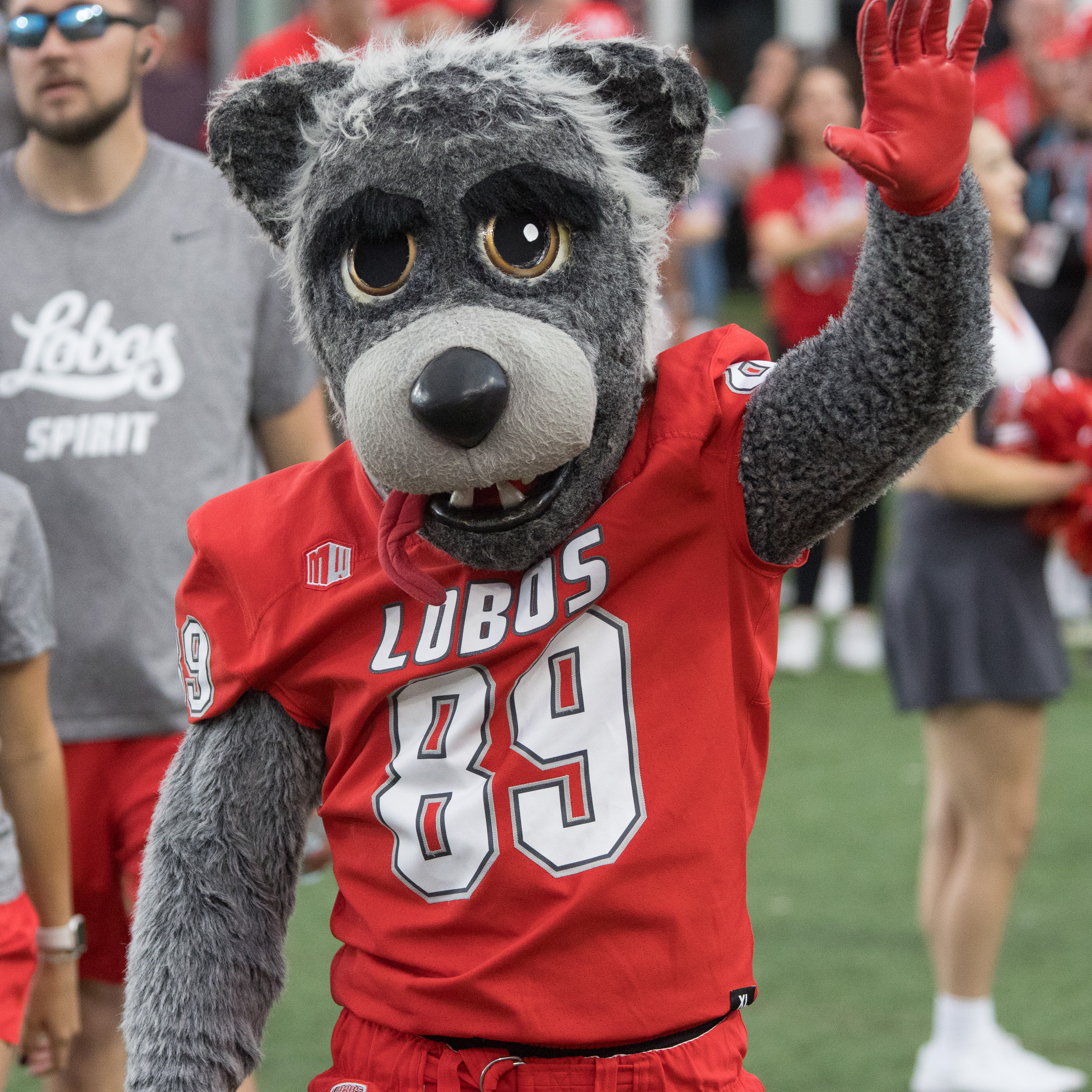
Lobo Louie

- LaCumba – jaguar mascot of the Southern Jaguars and Lady Jaguars
- Laker Louie – duck mascot of the Lake Land Lakers
- LeeRoy – tiger mascot of the Trinity Tigers
- Leroy the Lynx – mascot of the Rhodes Lynx; replaced Maximus in 2013 after a vote from the student body
- Leo the Lion – mascot of the Bryan Lions and the Purdue Northwest Pride
- Leo and Lea Leopard – co-mascots of the La Verne Leopards
- Leo and Una – lions, co-mascots of the North Alabama Lions
- Leo III - live lion mascot of the North Alabama Lions
- Lewis the Lion - lion mascot of the Flagler College Saints
- The Leprechaun – mascot of the Notre Dame Fighting Irish
- Lightning – pegasus-like creature, mascot of the Middle Tennessee Blue Raiders
- Lil' Red – secondary mascot of the Nebraska Cornhuskers
- Lizzie the Screaming Eagle – mascot of the Saint Elizabeth Eagles
- Lloyd the Lancer – mascot of the Eastern Wyoming Community College Lancers
- Lobo – wolf mascot of the John Carroll Blue Streaks
- Louie the Cardinal – mascot of the Louisville Cardinals
- LU Bison – mascot of the Lipscomb Bisons
- LU Wolf – mascot of the Loyola Ramblers
- Louie the Laker – mascot of the Grand Valley State Lakers
- Louie the Loper – mascot of the Nebraska–Kearney Lopers
- Louie the Triton – newt mascot of the UMSL Tritons
- Lobo Louie and Lobo Lucy – wolves, co-mascots of the New Mexico Lobos
- Louie the Lumberjack – mascot of the Northern Arizona Lumberjacks
- Lucky the Lion – mascot of the East Texas A&M Lions
- Lucy – live binturong mascot of the Cincinnati Bearcats

=== M ===
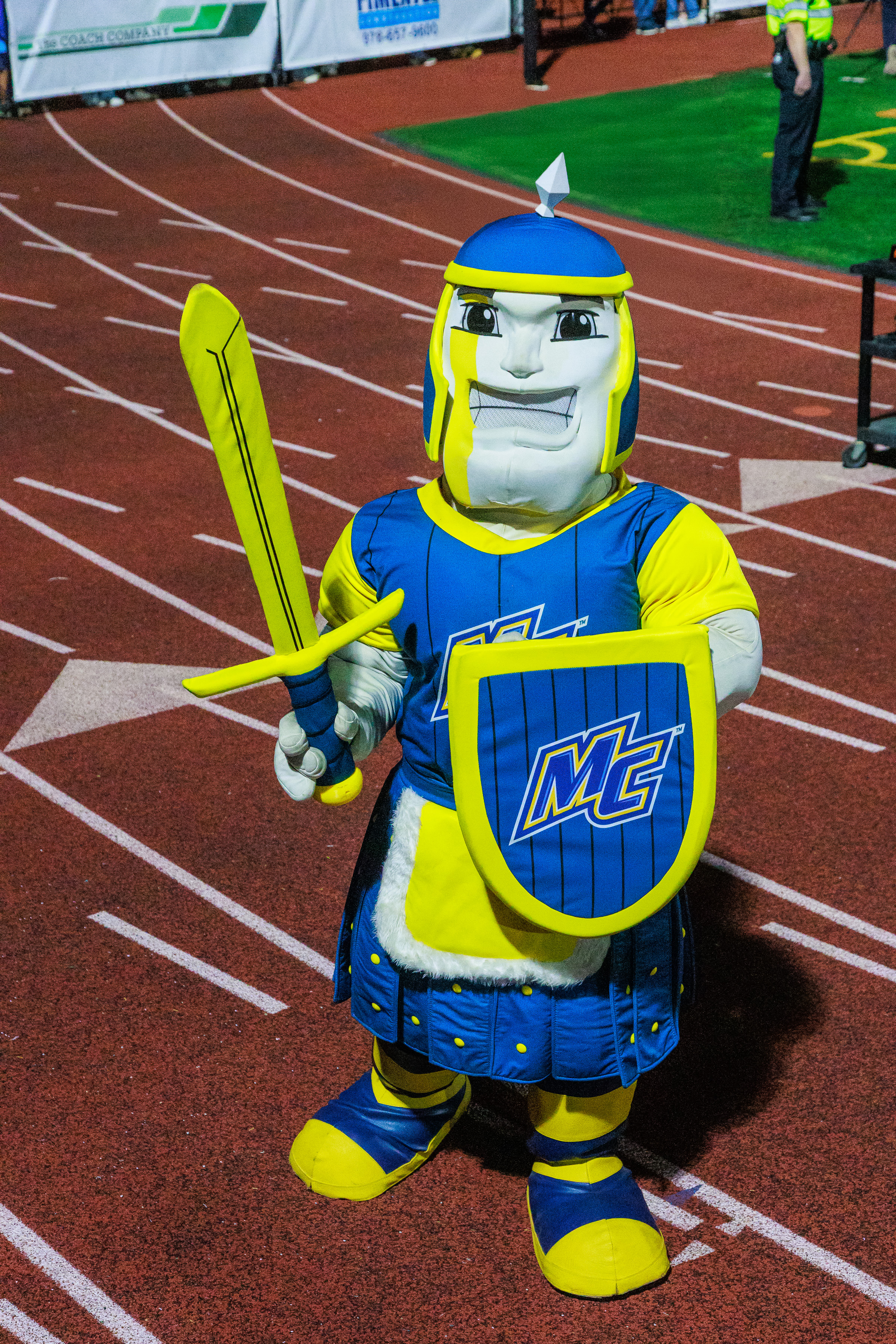
Mack the Warrior

- Mac - Scottish Terrier mascot of the Immaculata Mighty Macs
- Mac T. Bulldog and Lulu – bulldogs, co-mascots of the Gardner–Webb Runnin' Bulldogs
- Mac the Scot – mascot of the Macalester Scots
- Mack – mascot of the Linfield Wildcats
- Mack the Warrior – knight mascot of the Merrimack Warriors
- Mad Jack – mountaineer mascot of the Western Colorado Mountaineers
- Magnus – viking mascot of the Cleveland State Vikings
- Mammoth - mascot of the Amherst Mammoths
- The Marauder – co-mascot of the Millersville Marauders
- Marco the Bison – mascot of the Marshall Thundering Herd
- Mario the Magnificent Dragon – mascot of the Drexel Dragons
- Marty the Saint – mascot of the Saint Martin's Saints
- Marvin the Miner – co-mascot of the Colorado Mines Orediggers
- The Masked Rider – co-mascot of the Texas Tech Red Raiders
- Matty the Matador – mascot of the Cal State Northridge Matadors
- Max C. Bear – mascot of the SUNY Potsdam Bears
- Miami Maniac – the baseball-only mascot of the Miami Hurricanes
- Mighty the Lizard – mascot of the Truckee Meadows CC Lizards
- Mike the Knight – mascot of the Saint Michael's Purple Knights
- Mike the Tiger – live/costumed tiger mascot of the LSU Tigers
- Mingus – jazz cat, official mascot of the Berklee College of Music
- Mingo – the costumed Husky mascot of Houston Christian University.
- Mr. C (full name: Mr. Commodore) – mascot of the Vanderbilt Commodores
- Mr. Wuf and Mrs. Wuf – wolves, co-mascots of the NC State Wolfpack; they were married during halftime of the NC State-Wake Forest game on February 28, 1981
- Mocsie – mascot of the Florida Southern Moccasins
- Moe – kangaroo mascot of the VMI Keydets
- MoHarv – golden eagle mascot of the Charleston Golden Eagles
- Mo the Mule – mascot of the Central Missouri Mules and Jennies
- Monado – tiger mascot of the Zane State Tigers
- Monte the Eagle – mascot of the Niagara Purple Eagles
- Monte the Grizzly – grizzly bear mascot of the Montana Grizzlies and Lady Griz
- Monte the Mustang – mascot of the Morningside Mustangs
- Monty the Golden Bear – Mascot of West Virginia University Institute of Technology Golden Bears
- Monty the Mountaineer – mascot of Eastern Oregon University Mountaineers
- Monty the Mountain Lion – mascot of the Schreiner Mountaineers
- Morty the Mule – mascot of the Colby Mules
- Mountaineer – a West Virginia University student who dresses in pioneer costume as the school's mascot
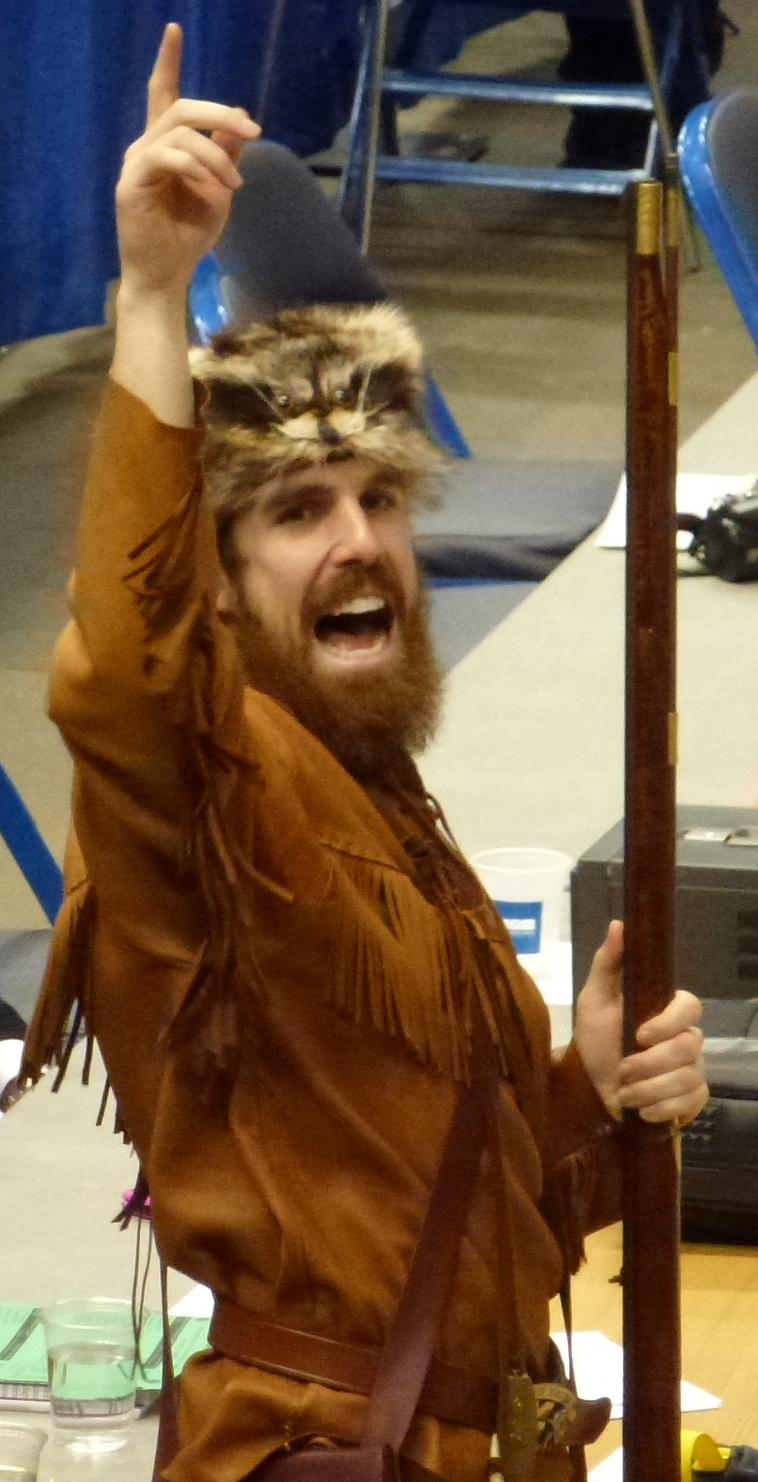
  The Mountaineer, the mascot of the West Virginia Mountaineers
- Mulerider and Molly – co-mascots of the Southern Arkansas Muleriders; a student dresses in mule rider costume and rides Molly, a live mule
- Musty the Mustang – mascot of the Cal Poly Mustangs
- MUcaw – bird mascot of the Mount Union Purple Raiders
- Musko – fish mascot of the Lakeland Muskies

=== N ===
- Nathan the Quaker – mascot of the Guilford Quakers
- Nellie – Dolphin mascot of the Jacksonville Dolphins
- The Nittany Lion – mascot of the Penn State Nittany Lions
- Norm the Niner – mascot of the Charlotte 49ers
- Nook - mascot of the University of Alaska Fairbanks Nanooks
- Norm the Crimson Hawk – mascot of the IUP Crimson Hawks
- NYIT Bear – mascot of the NYIT Bears
- Nestor – Owl mascot of the Westfield State Owls

=== O ===
- Oakie – acorn mascot of the SUNY-ESF Mighty Oaks
- Oakley the Barn Owl – mascot of the Texas Woman's Pioneers
- Objee – bear mascot of the Coast Guard Bears and until 1984 a live bear kept on campus.
- Ody Owl – mascot of the Mississippi University for Women Owls
- Ole the Lion – mascot of the St. Olaf Oles
- Olé Gaucho – unofficial mascot of the UC Santa Barbara Gauchos
- Olé the Viking – mascot of Long Beach City Vikings
- Ollie the Owl – mascot of the Brandeis Judges
- Olympia the Owl – mascot of Bryn Mawr
- The Oregon Duck – mascot of the Oregon Ducks
- Oski the Bear – mascot of the California Golden Bears
- Otto the Orange – mascot of the Syracuse Orange
- Otus the Owl - mascot of the Southern Connecticut Owls
- Owl – mascot of Bryn Mawr and Kenyon
- Ozzie – osprey mascot of the North Florida Ospreys
- Ozzy the Eagle – mascot of the Ozarks Tech CC Eagles

=== P ===
- The Panther – mascot of the Middlebury Panthers.
- The Patriot – mascot of the George Mason Patriots
- Patrick the Patriot – mascot of the Dallas Baptist Patriots
- Paws – mascot of the Western Carolina Catamounts
- Paws – costumed mascot of the Northeastern Huskies
- Paydirt Pete – mascot of the UTEP Miners
- Pedey – bull mascot of the Mesalands CC Stampede
- PeeDee – pirate mascot of the East Carolina Pirates
- Pegasus – live white Andalusian mascot of the UCF Knights
- Peruna – Shetland pony mascot of the SMU Mustangs
- Pete & Penny – emperor penguins dressed in scarfs and stocking caps; mascots of the Youngstown State Penguins
- Pete the Panther – mascot of the Florida Tech Panthers
- Peter the Anteater – mascot of the UCI Anteaters; based on the "ZOT!"-emitting animal from the comic strip B.C.
- Peter the Peacock - mascot of the Saint Peter's Peacocks
- Petey the Griffin – mascot of the Canisius Golden Griffins
- Petey Penmen – mascot of Southern New Hampshire Penmen
- Petey the Pirate – mascot of the Hampton Pirates
- Petey the Stormy Petrel – mascot of the Oglethorpe Stormy Petrels
- Phil the Phoenix – mascot of the Chicago Maroons
- Philip D. Tiger – tiger mascot of the St. Philip's Tigers
- Phineas the Phoenix – mascot of the Swarthmore Garnet
- Phlash the Phoenix – mascot of the Green Bay Phoenix
- The Phoenix – mascot of Elon, Florida Poly, and Olin
- Pio Pete – pioneer mascot of the Carroll University Pioneers
- Pioneer – mascot of the Grinnell Pioneers
- Pioneer Pete – mascot of the Cal State East Bay Pioneers
- Pirate – mascot of the Seton Hall Pirates
- Pistol Pete – mascot of the Oklahoma State Cowboys and Cowgirls
- Pistol Pete – mascot of the New Mexico State Aggies
- Pistol Pete – costumed mascot of the Wyoming Cowboys and Cowgirls
- Polar Bear – mascot of the Bowdoin Polar Bears
- Pork Chop – secondary mascot of the Arkansas Razorbacks
- Porky the Javelina – mascot of the Texas A&M–Kingsville Javelinas
- Pouncer – costumed tiger mascot of the Memphis Tigers.
- Pounce the Cougar – mascot of the Minnesota–Morris Cougars
- Pounce the Panther – mascot of the Georgia State Panthers
- Pounce the Panther – mascot of the Milwaukee Panthers
- Power Cat – tiger mascot of the Pacific Tigers
- Privateer Pete – mascot of the Maritime Privateers
- The Pronghorn – mascot of the Gillette Pronghorns
- Prowler – panther mascot of the High Point Panthers
- Purple Knight – mascot of the Bridgeport Purple Knights
- Puckman – anthropomorphic hockey puck mascot of the RPI Engineers
- Purdue Pete – mascot of the Purdue Boilermakers

=== Q ===
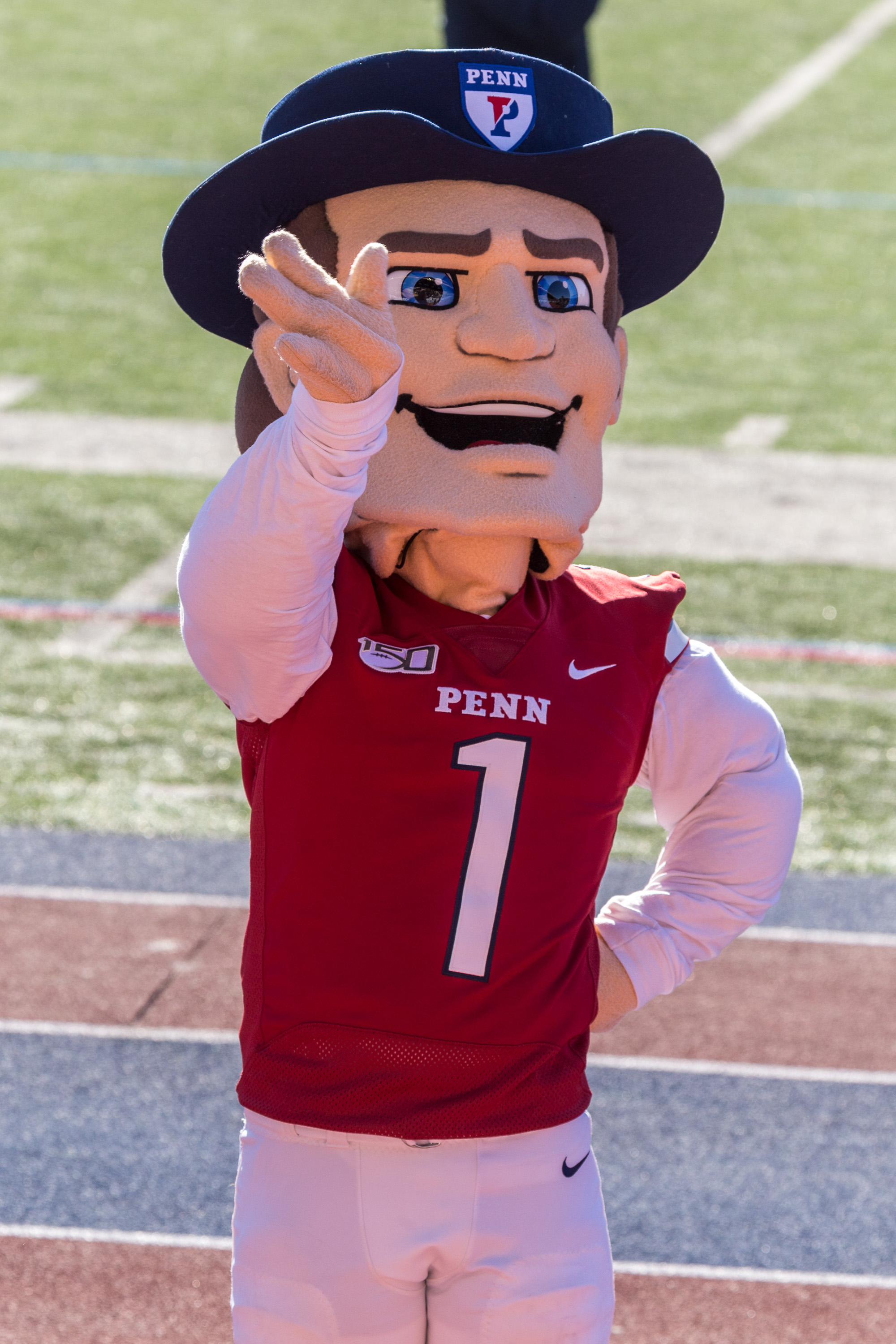
The Quaker

- The Quaker – mascot of the University of Pennsylvania Quakers

=== R ===
- Racer 1— live horse mascot of the Murray State Racers
- The Raider – mascot of Colgate University
- Raider Red – one of the official mascots of the Texas Tech Red Raiders
- Rally – the mascot of the University of Vermont Catamounts.
- Rally the Red Hawk – the mascot of the Ripon College (Wisconsin) Red Hawks.
- Ralphie the Buffalo – a live American bison the official mascot of the Colorado Buffaloes
- Ralphie and Roxie – greyhounds, co-mascots of the Eastern New Mexico Greyhounds
- The Ram – mascot of the Fordham Rams
- Ramblin' Wreck – the Model A Sports Coupe mascot of the Georgia Tech Yellow Jackets
- Rameses – live/costumed ram mascot of the North Carolina Tar Heels
- Rammy – mascot of the West Chester Golden Rams
- Ram-bo - mascot of Farmingdale State College
- RAMbo – costumed mascot of the Shepherd Rams.
- Ranger D. Bear – mascot of the Wisconsin–Parkside Rangers
- Razor the Shark – mascot of the Nova Southeastern Sharks
- Rawhide – mustang mascot of the Western New Mexico Mustangs
- R.B. Bbhoggawact – "riverbat" mascot of the Austin CC Riverbats
- Red The Cardinal – mascot of the Incarnate Word Cardinals and the Massachusetts College of Pharmacy and Health Sciences Cardinals
- Red Dragon – mascot of the SUNY Oneonta Red Dragons
- Reddie Spirit – athletic emblem of the Henderson State Reddies
- Reggie Redbird – mascot of the Illinois State Redbirds
- Reveille – live collie mascot of the Texas A&M Aggies; is taken care of by the Corps of Cadets
- Reveley - griffin mascot of the William & Mary Tribe
- Rex the Lion – mascot of the Queens Royals
- Rett and Ave – cougars, co-mascots of the Averett Cougars
- Rhett the Boston Terrier – mascot of the Boston University Terriers
- Rhody the Ram – mascot of the Rhode Island Rams
- Ribby – baseball-only mascot of the Arkansas Razorbacks
- RITchie the Tiger – mascot of the RIT Tigers
- Riptide – pelican mascot of the Tulane Green Wave
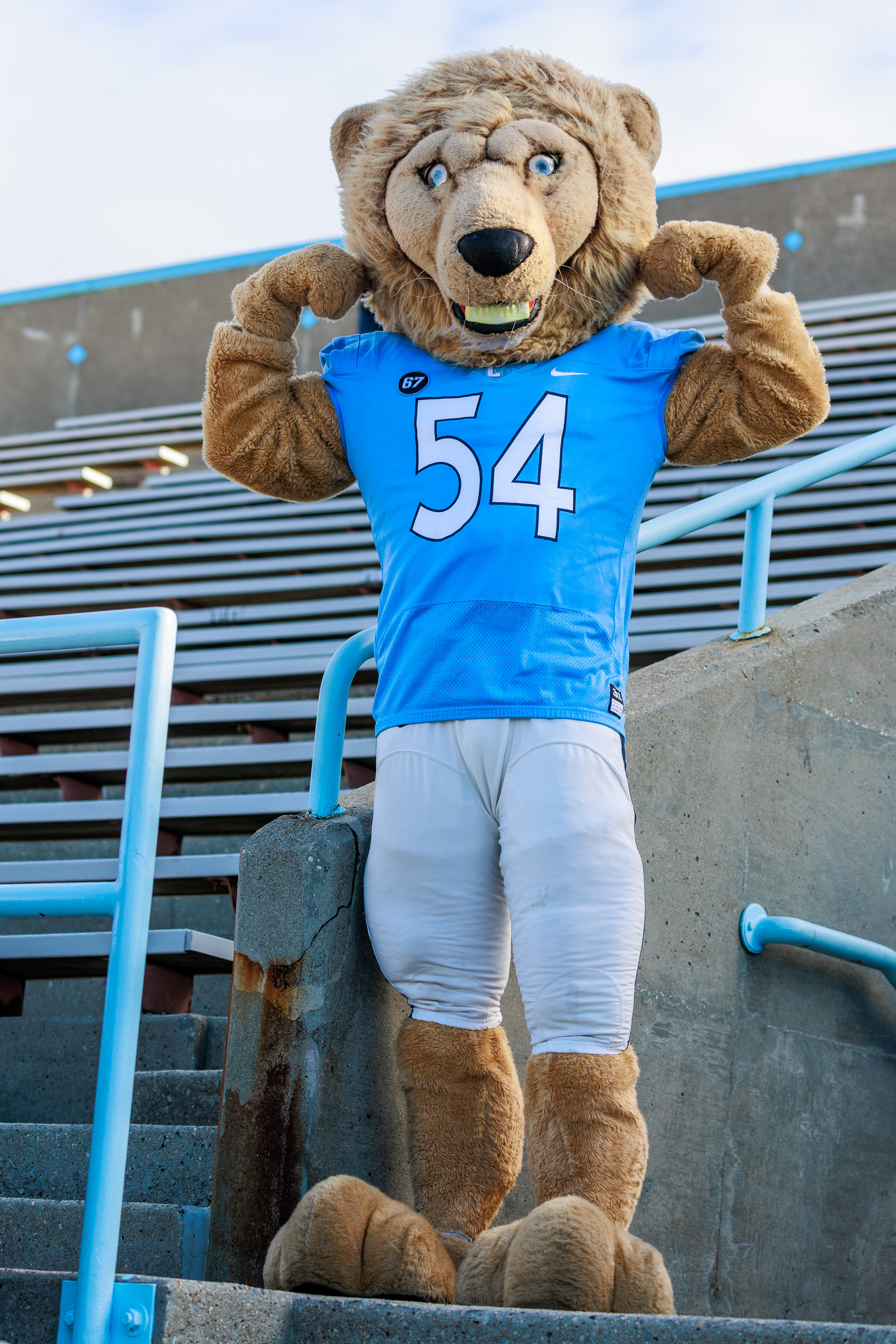
  Roar-ee the Lion
- Roar-ee the Lion – mascot of the Columbia Lions
- Roary the Lion – mascot of the Missouri Southern Lions
- Roary the Panther – mascot of the FIU Panthers
- Roc the Panther – mascot of the Pittsburgh Panthers
- RoCCy – tiger mascot of Colorado College; changed from Prowler in 2020
- Rocky Raider – mascot of the Three Rivers CC Raiders
- Rocky the Bull – mascot of the South Florida Bulls
- Rocky the Bulldog – costumed mascot of the UNC Asheville Bulldogs and the Western Illinois Leathernecks
- Rocky the Golden Eagle - mascot of the Cornerstone University Golden Eagles
- Rocky II the Lion – mascot of the Slippery Rock University of Pennsylvania
- Rocky the Ram - mascot of City College of San Francisco
- Rocky the Raven – mascot of the Franklin Pierce Ravens
- Rocky the Red Hawk – mascot of the Montclair State Red Hawks
- Rocky the Rocket and Rocksy the Rockette – anthropomorphized rockets, co-mascots of the Toledo Rockets
- Rocky the Yellowjacket – mascot of the Rochester Yellowjackets
- Rocky I – live bulldog mascot of the UNC Asheville Bulldogs
- Rodney the Ram – mascot of the VCU Rams
- Rodney the Raven – mascot of the Anderson Ravens and Lady Ravens
- Roscoe The Lion – mascot of the TCNJ Lions
- Rosie – elephant mascot of the Rose–Hulman Fightin' Engineers
- Roomie the Lion – mascot of the Southeastern Louisiana Lions
- Roongo the Husky – mascot of the Bloomsburg Huskies
- Rooney – mascot of the Roanoke Maroons
- Rowdy – secondary mascot of the Purdue Boilermakers
- Rowdy – a roadrunner that is the mascot for the University of Texas at San Antonio.
- Rowdy Raider – wolf mascot of the Wright State Raiders; was a Viking until 1997
- Rowdy the Cowboy – mascot of the McNeese State Cowboys
- Rowdy the Gopher – mascot of the Goucher Gophers
- Rowdy the Maverick – mascot of the Colorado Mesa Mavericks
- Rowdy the Panther – mascot of the Birmingham-Southern Panthers
- Rowdy the Riverhawk – mascot of the UMass Lowell River Hawks
- Rowdy the Red Hawk – mascot of the Southeast Missouri State Redhawks
- Rowdy the Roadrunner – mascot of the Cal State Bakersfield Roadrunners and the MSU Denver Roadrunners
- Rudy Flyer – mascot of the Dayton Flyers
- Rudy the Redhawk – mascot of the Seattle Redhawks
- Rufus the Bobcat – mascot of the Ohio Bobcats
- Rufus the Bobcat – mascot of the UC Merced Golden Bobcats
- Rufus the Red Wolf – mascot of the Indiana East Red Wolves
- Rusty the Rustler – mascot of the Central Wyoming Rustlers

=== S ===
- Sam the Minuteman – mascot of the UMass Minutemen and Minutewomen
- Sam the Ram – mascot of the Framingham State Rams
- Sam the Ram – mascot of the Fresno City College Rams
- Sammy D. Eagle – mascot of the Mary Washington Eagles
- Sammy Seahawk – mascot of the Broward College Seahawks and the Salve Regina Seahawks
- Sammy Spartan – mascot of the San Jose State Spartans
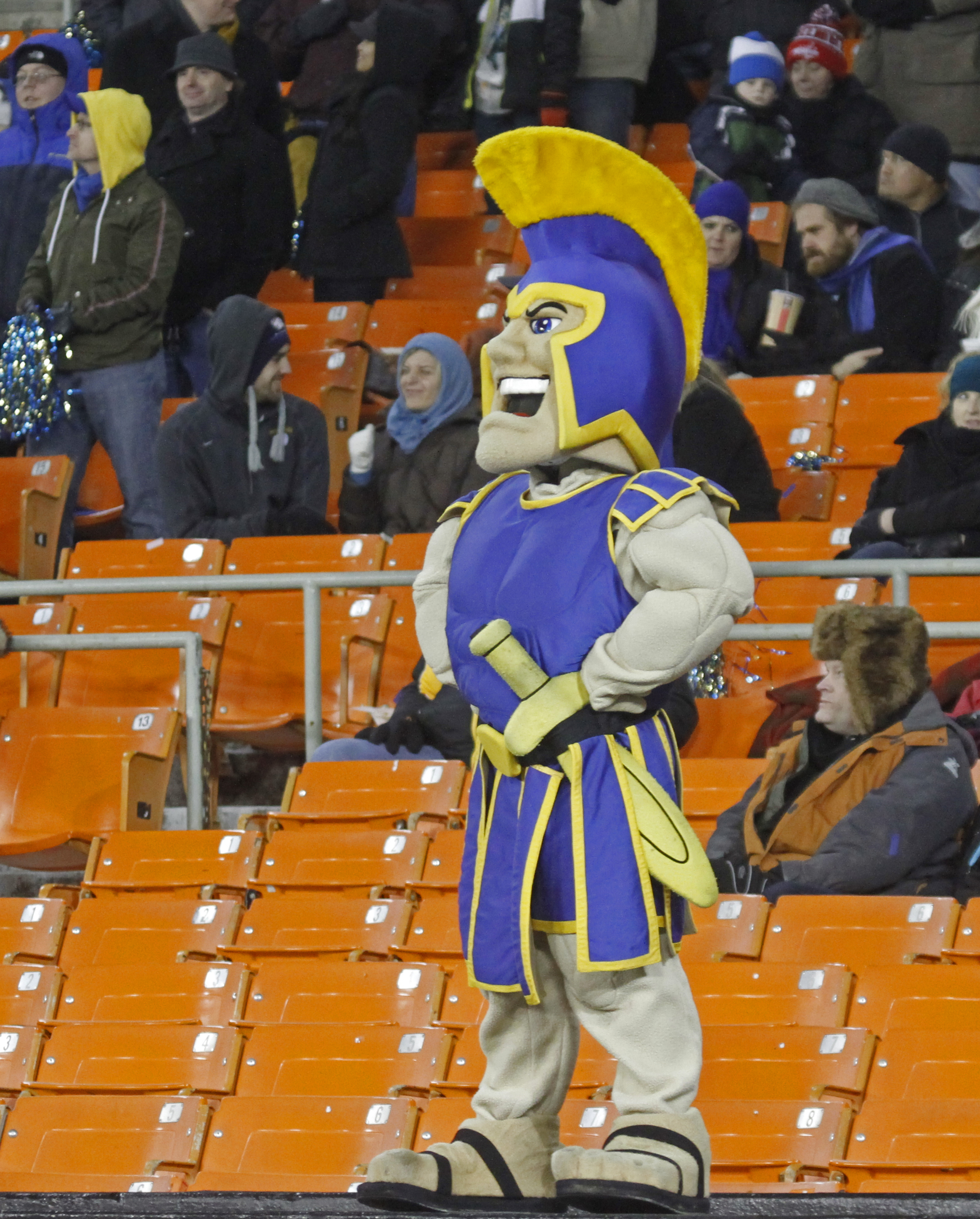
  Sammy Spartan, the mascot of the San Jose State Spartans
- Sammy the Owl – mascot of the Rice Owls
- Sammy the Sabre – mascot of the Marian Sabres
- Sammy the Seagull – mascot of the Salisbury Seagulls
- Sammy the Slug – mascot of the UC Santa Cruz Banana Slugs
- Sammy and Samantha Bearkat – co-mascots of the Sam Houston State Bearkats
- Scorch – humanoid mascot of the Southeastern University (Florida) Fire
- Scorch the Dragon – mascot of the Minnesota State–Moorhead Dragons
- Scrappy Moc – Mockingbird, mascot of the Chattanooga Mocs
- Scrappy the Eagle – the eagle mascot of the North Texas Mean Green
- Scrappy the Owl – costumed mascot of the Kennesaw State Owls
- Scratch – secondary mascot of the Kentucky Wildcats; catered towards younger audiences
- Screech A. Eagle – mascot of the University of Northwestern Eagles
- Screech the Owl – mascot of the William Woods Owls
- Scottie – scottie dog mascot of the Agnes Scott Scotties
- Scotty – human mascot of the Alma Scots
- Scotty the Scottie Dog – mascot of the Carnegie Mellon Tartans
- Scotty the Scotsman – human mascot of the Presbyterian Blue Hose
- Scotty Highlander – tartan-clad bear mascot of the UC Riverside Highlanders
- Scrotie – unofficial mascot of the Rhode Island School of Design
- Sebastian the Ibis – mascot of the Miami Hurricanes
- Seymour D'Campus – mascot of the Southern Miss Golden Eagles and Lady Eagles
- Shadow – mascot of the Monmouth Hawks
- The Shark – mascot of the UNLV Rebels; while the school's teams are named the Rebels, the mascot is a shark in honor of former men's basketball coach Jerry Tarkanian, nicknamed "The Shark"
- Shasta and Sasha – cougars, co-mascots of the Houston Cougars
- Shel – turtle mascot of the Flor ida Keys Tugas; named for poet Shel Silverstein
- Sir Big Spur – live rooster mascot of the South Carolina Gamecocks since 2006
- Sir Henry – knight mascot of the Rutgers Scarlet Knights
- Sir Lance-a-lute – mascot of the Pacific Lutheran Lutes
- Sir Paladin – mascot of the Furman Paladins
- Sir Victor - mascot of the Wartburg College Knights
- Skitch – Sasquatch (Bigfoot) mascot of the CC Spokane Sasquatch
- Skully the Parrot – co-mascot of the Millersville Marauders
- Skully – unofficial skull mascot of the East Carolina Pirates
- Skylar the Seahawk – mascot of the Keiser Seahawks
- Slater – mascot of the Green River Gators
- Smokey – live/costumed bluetick coonhound mascot of the Tennessee Volunteers
- Sol the Suncat – the yellow cat mascot of Central New Mexico CC
- Southpaw and Miss Pawla – jaguars, co-mascots of the South Alabama Jaguars
- Sparky the Sun Devil – mascot of the Arizona State Sun Devils
- Sparky the Dragon– dragon mascot of the UIC Flames
- Sparky the Eagle – eagle mascot of the Liberty Flames and Lady Flames
- Spartacus - Spartan mascot of the Missouri Baptist Spartans
- Sparty – Spartan mascot of the Michigan State Spartans; a comical (and extremely buff) representation of a Spartan hoplite soldier clad in green with an elongated head.
- Sparty the Spartan – mascot of the USC Upstate Spartans
- Speedy the Geoduck – mascot of the Evergreen State Geoducks
- Spike the Bulldog – mascot of the Drake Bulldogs, the Gonzaga Bulldogs, the Samford Bulldogs, and The Citadel Bulldogs
- Spike and Simone – bulldogs, co-mascots of the Truman Bulldogs
- Spike the Whale - mascot of the University of Alaska Southeast
- Spirit - mascot of the University of Alaska Anchorage Seawolves
- Spirit Leader - mascot of the San Diego State Aztecs; changed from Monty Montezuma, represented by a student wearing inaccurate Indigenous garments
- Spiro and Minerva – Spartan and Goddess, co-mascots of the UNC Greensboro Spartans
- Spiro the Spartan – mascot of the Norfolk State Spartans
- The Stag – mascot of the Fairfield Stags
- The Stanford Tree – official mascot of Stanford Band and unofficial mascot of the Stanford Cardinal.
- Star the Pacific Tree Frog – mascot of the North Seattle Tree Frogs
- The Statesman – the official mascot of the Delta State Statesmen and Lady Statesmen
- Stella – live owl mascot of the Temple Owls
- Stertorous "Tor" Thunder – mascot of the Wheaton Thunder
- Stevie Pointer – mascot of the Wisconsin–Stevens Point Pointers
- Sting – yellow jacket mascot of the Black Hills State Yellow Jackets
- Stinger the Wasp – mascot of the Emory and Henry Wasps
- Stomper – maverick mascot of the Minnesota State Mavericks
- Storm – tiger mascot of the Trine Thunder, first introduced in 2010
- Stormy – anthropomorphic cyclone mascot of the Lake Erie Storm
- Stormy the Shark – mascot of the Simmons Sharks
- Stormin' Normin' – mascot of the New England Nor'easters.
- Sturgis – live owl mascot of the Kennesaw State Owls
- Sunny the Sunbird – mascot of the Fresno Pacific Sunbirds
- Superfrog – horned frog mascot of the TCU Horned Frogs
- Swoop – mascot of the Eastern Michigan Eagles
- Swoop the Eagle – mascot of the Eastern Washington Eagles and the Emory Eagles
- Swoop the Hawk – mascot of the Utah Utes and the Miami RedHawks
- Sycamore Sam – mascot of the Indiana State Sycamores; forest animal costume of no particular species but looks like a blue fox or dog

=== T ===
- Talon the Eagle – mascot of the Laramie County CC Golden Eagles
- Talon the Hawk – mascot of the Illinois Tech Scarlet Hawks
- Tarzán and Jane – live bulldogs, co-mascots of the Puerto Rico-Mayagüez Bulldogs
- TC and TK — panthers, co-mascots of the Northern Iowa Panthers
- Tech – live bulldog mascot of the Louisiana Tech Bulldogs
- Terrible Swede – mascot of the Bethany Swedes
- Temoc – comet mascot of the Texas-Dallas Comets
- Texan Rider – cowboy mascot of the Tarleton State Texans
- Testudo – Diamondback Terrapin mascot of the Maryland Terrapins.
- Teton – buffalo mascot of the Williston State Tetons
- Thor – thunderbird mascot of Cloud County CC, Mesa CC, and the Southern Utah Thunderbirds
- Thresher – mascot of the Bethel Threshers
- Thundar – bison mascot of the North Dakota State Bison
- Thunder the Antelope – mascot of the Grand Canyon Antelopes
- Thunder the Bison – live mascot of the West Texas A&M Buffaloes
- Thunder the Bobcat – mascot of the Georgia College Bobcats
- Thunder the Mustang – mascot of the Western Wyoming CC Mustangs
- Thunder the Wolf – mascot of the Northern State Wolves
- Thunderbird – mascot of the Casper Thunderbirds
- Thundercat – mascot of the Southern Nazarene Crimson Storm
- The Monks – mascot of the Saint Joseph's College of Maine Monks
- The Tiger – mascot of the Princeton Tigers
- The Tiger – mascot of the Clemson Tigers
- The Tiger Cub – secondary mascot of the Clemson Tigers; catered towards younger audiences
- Tim the Beaver – mascot of the MIT Engineers
- Timeout – bulldog mascot of the Fresno State Bulldogs
- Toby the Bear – bear mascot of the Mercer Bears
- Toby the Tiger – mascot of the East Texas Baptist Tigers
- TOM III – live Bengal tiger mascot of the Memphis Tigers
- Tommy Mo – saint mascot of the Thomas More Saints
- Tommy Titan – mascot of the Detroit Mercy Titans
- Tommy Trojan – unofficial mascot of the USC Trojans
- Top Daug - mascot of the Oklahoma Sooners men's basketball team
- Topper the Hilltopper – mountain goat mascot of the St. Edward's Hilltoppers
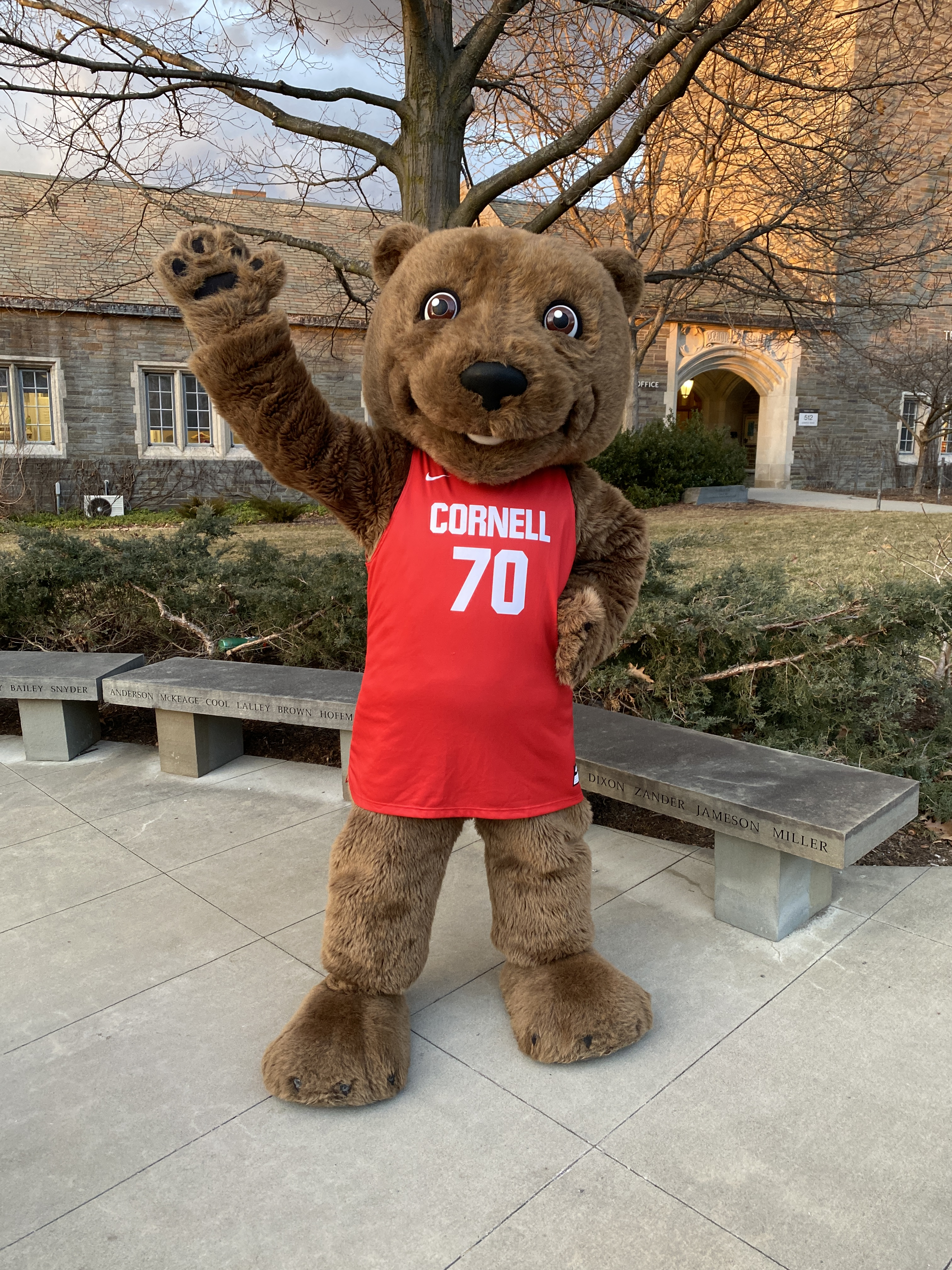
  Touchdown
- Touchdown – unofficial black bear mascot of the Cornell Big Red; also known as the Big Red Bear
- Tony the Landshark – mascot of the Ole Miss Rebels; replaced Rebel Black Bear and Colonel Reb
- The Trapper – mascot of the Northwest Trappers
- Traveler – live white horse mascot of the USC Trojans
- True Grit – Chesapeake Bay Retriever mascot of the UMBC Retrievers
- Truman the Tiger – mascot of the Missouri Tigers, named for former U.S. president Harry S. Truman (the only Missouri native to hold the office).
- Tupper the Bulldog – mascot of the Bryant Bulldogs and named for Earl Tupper, the creator of Tupperware
- Tuffy – eagle mascot of the Ashland Eagles and elephant mascot of the Cal State Fullerton Titans
- T-Roy – Trojan mascot of the Troy Trojans
- Tusk – live Russian boar mascot of the Arkansas Razorbacks
- Tyler the Tiger – tiger mascot of the DePauw Tigers

=== U ===
- Uga – live Bulldog, mascot of the Georgia Bulldogs

=== V ===
- Val the Valkyrie – mascot of the Converse Valkyries
- 'Valor – horse mascot of the Evangel Crusaders
- Venom – rattlesnake mascot of the Florida A&M Rattlers and Lady Rattlers
- Vic and Tory – live Greyhounds, co-mascots of the Eastern New Mexico Greyhounds
- Vic the Demon – mascot of the Northwestern State Demons and Lady Demons
- Victor E. Bluejay – mascot of the Elmhurst Bluejays
- Victor E. Bull – mascot of the Buffalo Bulls
- Victor E. Bulldog – mascot of the Fresno State Bulldogs
- Victor E. Huskie – mascot of the Northern Illinois Huskies
- Victor E. Tiger – mascot of the Fort Hays State Tigers
- Victor E. Lion – mascot of the Molloy Lions
- Victor E. Viking – mascot of the Northern Kentucky Norse, the Portland State Vikings, and the Western Washington Vikings
- Victor E. Hawk – mascot of the Viterbo V-Hawks
- Victor E. Warrior – mascot of the Wisconsin Lutheran Warriors
- Viktor the Viking – mascot of the Grand View Vikings
- Vili – unofficial mascot of the Hawai'i—Mānoa, played by Vili Fehoko
- Vinny the Dolphin – mascot of the Mount Saint Vincent Dolphins
- Vixen – mascot of the Sweet Briar Vixens

=== W ===
- W – mascot of the Wayne State Warriors
- Wakiza (Kiza) – live Husky mascot of the Houston Christian Huskies
- Waldo – Wildcat mascot of the Weber State Wildcats
- War Eagle VII – live golden eagle mascot of the Auburn Tigers
- Wally Pilot – mascot of the Portland Pilots
- Wally Wabash – human mascot of the Wabash Little Giants
- WebstUR – spider mascot of the Richmond Spiders
- Wellington – wildcat mascot of the Central Washington Wildcats
- Wesley the Wildcat – mascot of the Indiana Wesleyan Wildcats
- Whoo RU – Owl mascot of the Rowan Profs
- Wilbur and Wilma T. Wildcat – co-mascots of the Arizona Wildcats
- Wild E. Cat – co-mascot of the New Hampshire Wildcats
- The Wildcat – a costumed student who is one of three official mascots of the Kentucky Wildcats, two of which attend games.
- Wildcat Willy – mascot of the Northern Michigan Wildcats
- Will D. Cat – mascot of the Villanova Wildcats
- Will E. Wildcat - mascot of the Davidson Wildcats
- Willie Warhawk – mascot of the Wisconsin–Whitewater Warhawks
- Willie the Wave – mascot of the Pepperdine Waves
- Willie T. Wildcat – mascot of the Johnson & Wales Wildcats
- Willie Wildcat - mascot of the Kansas State Wildcats
- Willie the Wildcat – mascot of the Chico State Wildcats
- Willie the Wildcat - mascot of the Northwestern Wildcats
- Wily the Bobcat – mascot of the Lees-McRae Bobcats
- Wiley D. Wildcat – mascot of the Wilmington Wildcats
- Winnie the Lakes Monster - mascot of Lakes Region Community College
- Wolfie – mascot of the West Georgia Wolves and the Western Oregon Wolves
- Wolfie the Seawolf – mascot of the Stony Brook Seawolves
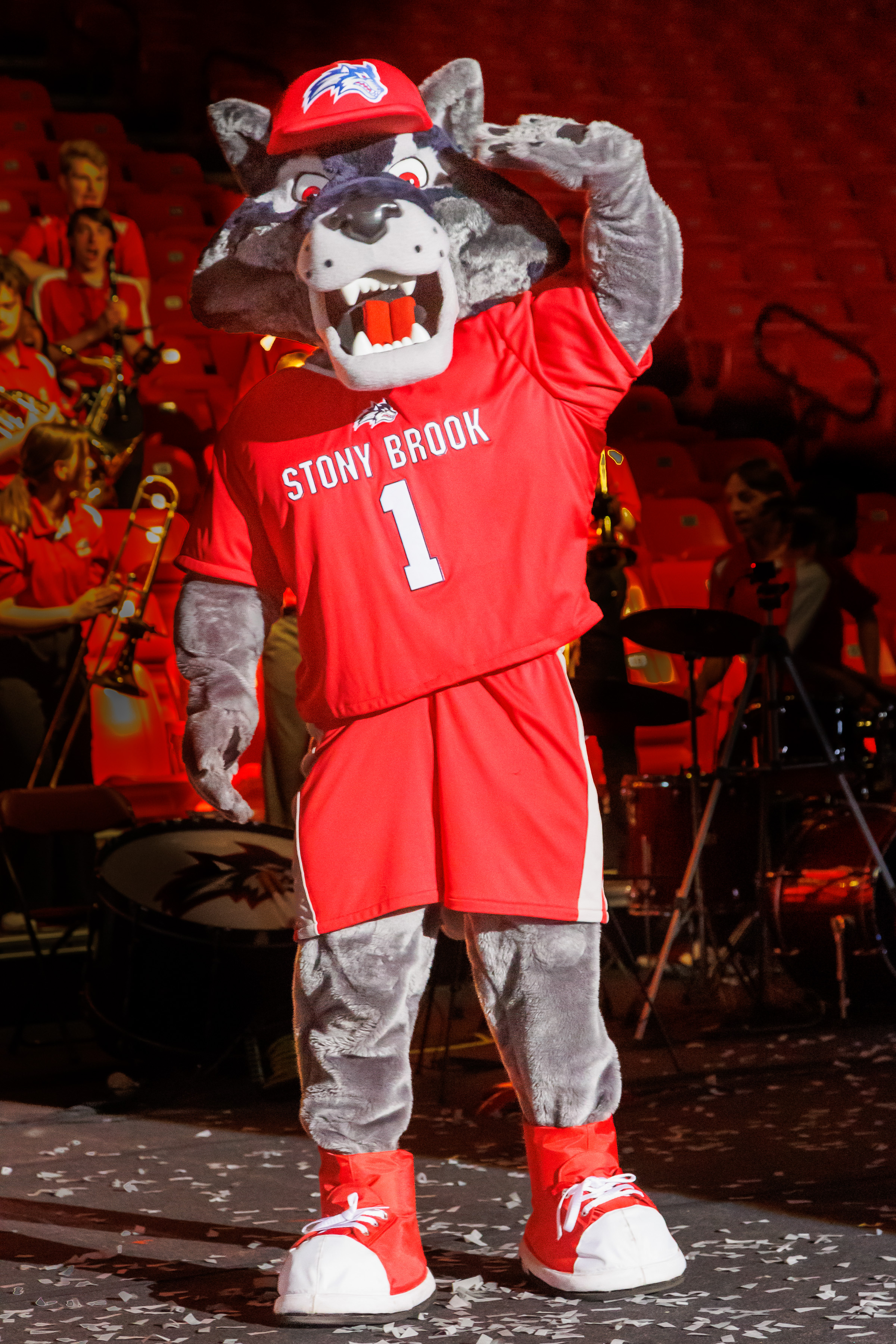
  Wolfie the seawolf
- Woody – Timberwolf, mascot of the Northwood Timberwolves
- Woody Wood Duck – mascot of the Century Wood Ducks
- WuShock – anthropomorphic wheat, mascot of the Wichita State Shockers

=== Y ===
- Yank – Tiger, mascot of the Hampden–Sydney Tigers
- YoUDee – Blue hen, mascot of the Delaware Fightin' Blue Hens
- Yosef – human mascot of the Appalachian State Mountaineers

=== Z ===
- Zippy the Kangaroo – Kangaroo, mascot of the Akron Zips

== See also ==
- List of mascots
- Mascot#Sports mascots
- Religious symbolism in U.S. sports team names and mascots
- College athletics in the United States
- College sports
- List of NCAA Division I institutions
- List of NCAA Division II institutions
- List of NCAA Division III institutions
- List of NAIA institutions
- List of NJCAA Division I schools
- List of NJCAA Division II schools
- List of NJCAA Division III schools
- List of USCAA institutions
- List of NCCAA institutions
