= CelebriDucks =

American Toy Company

CelebriDucks is an American manufacturer of celebrity-licensed rubber ducks based in San Rafael, California. As of July 2009, the CelebriDucks has created more than 200 different ducks, including Betty Boop, Charlie Chaplin, Groucho Marx, Babe Ruth, William Shakespeare, the Mona Lisa, and Santa Claus.

The company has been named a top 100 gift idea by Entertainment Weekly and was voted a fan favorite in a poll by ESPN.

== History ==
CelebriDucks was founded in 1998 by Craig Wolfe as a product of his animation design firm Name That Toon. Started as a "fun side project" with his daughter Rebecca, the new product line quickly took off. By the end of 2001, the ducks were bringing in $1 million in annual revenue.

In late 2001, the Philadelphia 76ers heard about CelebriDucks and asked for an Allen Iverson duck to be created for a stadium giveaway. The Iverson duck was shown on SportsCenter in January 2002, and a flurry of international press coverage followed, causing sales to triple. By April, the company was selling 1,000 ducks a week and on pace for $3 million of annual revenue. At that point, Wolfe realized the ducks were something special and sold his original business to focus solely on the rubber ducks. The company was named CelebriDucks to reflect its new nature.

CelebriDucks were named as a top 100 gift idea in Entertainment Weekly's 2001 holiday gift guide. In the summer of 2002, Sammy Sosa and Moisés Alou ducks were given away at Chicago Cubs games. Promotions for the Texas Rangers and New York Yankees followed. A poll conducted by ESPN found CelebriDucks the #1 fan favorite stadium giveaway, beating out bobbleheads and beanie babies.

Since 2002, CelebriDucks have been handed out at numerous sporting events, been written in numerous newspapers and magazines, appeared on The Late Show twice, and have been commissioned by over a dozen Fortune 500 companies.

== Products ==
As of July 2009, the CelebriDucks has created more than 200 different rubber ducks. Licensed products include actors, athletes, musicians, cartoon characters, and college mascots. Other ducks include religious figures, literary characters, and other figures from popular culture. The company also makes "rubber ducks" in the form of penguins, flamingoes, and parrots.

Each CelebriDuck comes in its own plastic carrying case, which features a quote to match the celebrity's persona. All ducks are "limited edition" and are subject to retirement at any time. Retired ducks include Elvis, Groucho Marx, Babe Ruth, and Charles Barkley.

The CelebriDucks website has a section devoted to the current best sellers and a "Hall of Fame" for retired ducks. As of July 2009, Marilyn Monroe, Betty Boop, and Barack Obama were listed among the site's best sellers.
