= William C. Dowling =

Dowling in July 2009

William Courtney Dowling (/ˈdaʊlɪŋ/; born April 5, 1944, in Warner, New Hampshire) is University Distinguished Professor of English and American Literature emeritus at Rutgers University in New Brunswick, New Jersey, specializing in 18th-century English literature, literature of the early American Republic, and Literary Theory.

== Biography ==
Born in Warner, New Hampshire, Dowling earned a Bachelor of Arts (A.B.) at Dartmouth College in Hanover, New Hampshire, where he was editor of the Dartmouth Jack-O-Lantern, the college humor magazine, a Senior Fellow in English, and recipient of the Perkins Prize in English and Classics. He received his Master of Arts (M.A.) and Doctor of Philosophy (Ph.D.) from Harvard University, where he administered the Dudley House fellowship program during the Mastership of Jean Mayer. Dowling is a past fellow of the Institute for Advanced Studies in the Humanities at the University of Edinburgh and the National Humanities Center, and has held Guggenheim, National Endowment for the Humanities, and Howard Foundation fellowships. In 1994–95, he was Senior Fulbright Lecturer in American Literature at the Universidad Autonoma de Madrid He is past winner of the Richard Beale Davis Prize for work in early American literature and a New Jersey Council of the Humanities award for his book Oliver Wendell Holmes in Paris: Medicine, Theology, and the Autocrat of the Breakfast Table; In 2012 he was the recipient of the Drake Group's Robert Maynard Hutchins Award for his part in the struggle against Div IA athletics corruption in American higher education.

Dowling retired from Rutgers in 2016 after 28 years with the university.

== Battle with Big East Sports ==
Dowling came to national attention in the 1990s through his work with the Rutgers 1000 campaign which fought for the removal of Division I sports from Rutgers.

In September 2007, a controversy arose when Rutgers Athletic Director Robert Mulcahy accused Dowling of racism for having dismissed, in a New York Times interview, the claim that athletic scholarships provide educational opportunities for minority students: "If you were giving the scholarship to an intellectually brilliant kid who happens to play a sport, that's fine. But they give it to a functional illiterate who can't read a cereal box, and then make him spend 50 hours a week on physical skills. That's not opportunity. If you want to give financial help to minorities, go find the ones who are at the library after school."

The Wall Street Journal labeled Mulcahy's attack a "campaign of character assassination" against a professor who had spoken out against athletics corruption at his university. In New Jersey, Dowling was most memorably defended by Donald and Roscoe Brown, in a column in the Trenton Times (2 October 2007): "I -- and many other blacks -- agree with Professor Dowling, that if Rutgers were serious about enhancing the development of a black intelligentsia, it would start recruiting 'black kids found in the library after school' as aggressively as it does black kids whose primary attributes are an ability to run fast and/or to jump high. Right on, Brother Dowling."

The Rutgers administration responded by releasing announcements stating that Rutgers ranks highly among state universities in the Academic Progress Report rankings compiled by the NCAA for the use of member schools.

Confessions of a Spoilsport: My Life and Hard Times Fighting Sports Corruption at an Old Eastern University, Dowling's memoir of the Rutgers 1000 campaign, was the occasion of a long personal interview in Inside Higher Education, and received substantial coverage in The New York Times, The Weekly Standard, The Manchester Guardian, and other publications. An interview with Ralph Nader's anti-sports-corruption group appeared on League of Fans in 2012. According to his Rutgers University web page, Dowling has recently published Professor's Song: A Life in Teaching, a memoir of his career in literary studies.

== Books ==
- Professor's Song: A Life in Teaching ISBN 166-416-179-1
- Ricoeur on Time and Narrative: An Introduction to Temps et Recit. (Notre Dame University Press, 2011) ISBN 978-0-268-02608-0
- ''Confessions of a Spoilsport: My Life and Hard Times Fighting Sports Corruption at an Old Eastern University (Penn State Press, 2007) ISBN 978-0-271-03293-1
- Oliver Wendell Holmes in Paris: Medicine, Theology, and the Autocrat of the Breakfast Table (University Press of New England, 2006) ISBN 1-58465-579-8
- A Reader's Companion to Infinite JestA Reader's Companion to Infinite Jest] (co-authored with Robert Bell) (Xlibris Corporation, 2004) ISBN 1413484468
- The Senses of the Text: Intensional Semantics and Literary Theory (University of Nebraska Press, 1999) ISBN 0-8032-6617-0
- Literary Federalism in the Age of Jefferson: Joseph Dennie and the Port Folio, 1801–1812 (University of South Carolina Press, 1999) ISBN 1-57003-243-2
- The Epistolary Moment: The Poetics of the Eighteenth-Century Verse Epistle (Princeton, NJ: Princeton University Press, 1991) ISBN 0-691-06891-7
- Poetry and Ideology in Revolutionary Connecticut (University of Georgia Press, 1990) ISBN 0-8203-1286-X
- Jameson, Althusser, Marx: An Introduction to the Political Unconscious (Ithaca, NY: Cornell University Press, 1984) ISBN 0-8014-9284-X
- Language and Logos in Boswell's Life of Johnson (Princeton, NJ: Princeton University Press, 1981) ISBN 0-691-06455-5
- The Boswellian Hero (University of Georgia Press, 1979) ISBN 0-8203-0461-1
- The Critic's Hornbook: Reading for interpretation (Crowell, 1977) ISBN 0-690-00884-8
