= Roary the Panther =

Mascot of Florida International University

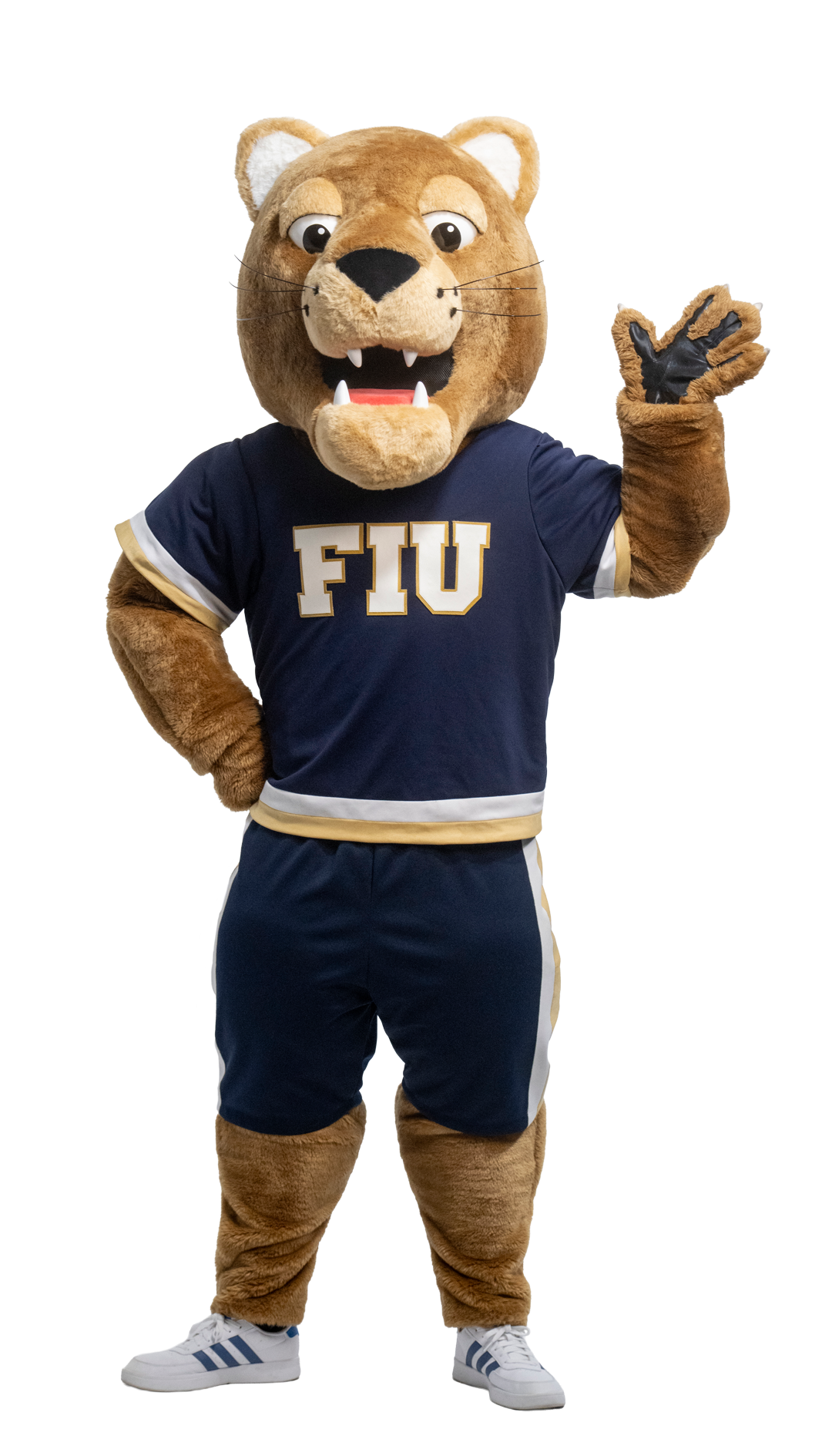
- Roary waving
- University: Florida International University
- Conference: Conference USA
- Description: Anthropomorphic panther
- First seen: 1987
- Website: FIUSports.com

Roary the Panther is the official costumed mascot of Florida International University (FIU) in Miami, Florida. Roary represents the university’s athletic teams—the FIU Panthers—and serves as a symbol of school pride and community engagement across athletics, student life, and outreach events.

== History ==
FIU's athletic teams adopted the nickname "Panthers" (originally "Golden Panthers") in 1987, replacing the former "Sunblazers" identity. The panther was chosen for its connection to the endangered Florida panther native to the Everglades, symbolizing strength, resilience, and the South Florida environment.

Roary the Panther was introduced soon after the rebranding and quickly became an integral part of FIU's campus spirit. Over time, the mascot's design evolved through several iterations, with modern updates to costume materials, facial structure, and athletic attire to better align with FIU's visual identity.

== Appearances ==
Roary appears at FIU football, basketball, and volleyball games, as well as at orientation events, commencement ceremonies, and community programs throughout South Florida. In addition to athletic performances, Roary frequently participates in marketing campaigns, digital content, and university partnerships that highlight FIU’s student experience and "Paws Up" spirit.

Roary has also made appearances at national mascot showcases and regional community events, representing FIU among other collegiate mascots across Florida.

== Design ==
Roary's modern costume depicts a muscular panther with a friendly but fierce expression, often dressed in FIU athletic uniforms. The design balances approachability for children and fans with athletic dynamism during performances. Variants of Roary's outfit include themed costumes for holidays, charity runs, and university milestone celebrations.

== In popular culture ==
- Roary's "Paws Up" gesture has become synonymous with FIU spirit and is often used in marketing and social media posts under hashtags such as #PawsUp.
- Roary has been featured in FIU's promotional videos, orientation materials, and recruitment campaigns, helping represent the university's welcoming and diverse culture.

== Hidden Roarys ==
In 2021, FIU launched "Hidden Roarys", a university-wide scavenger hunt inspired by the concept of hidden mascots across campus. Participants are challenged to locate both physical and digital versions of Roary hidden in key campus locations, often using augmented reality (AR) technology.

== See also ==
- FIU Panthers
- Florida International University
- List of U.S. college mascots
