= Blue Devil (mascot) =

Mascot of Duke University

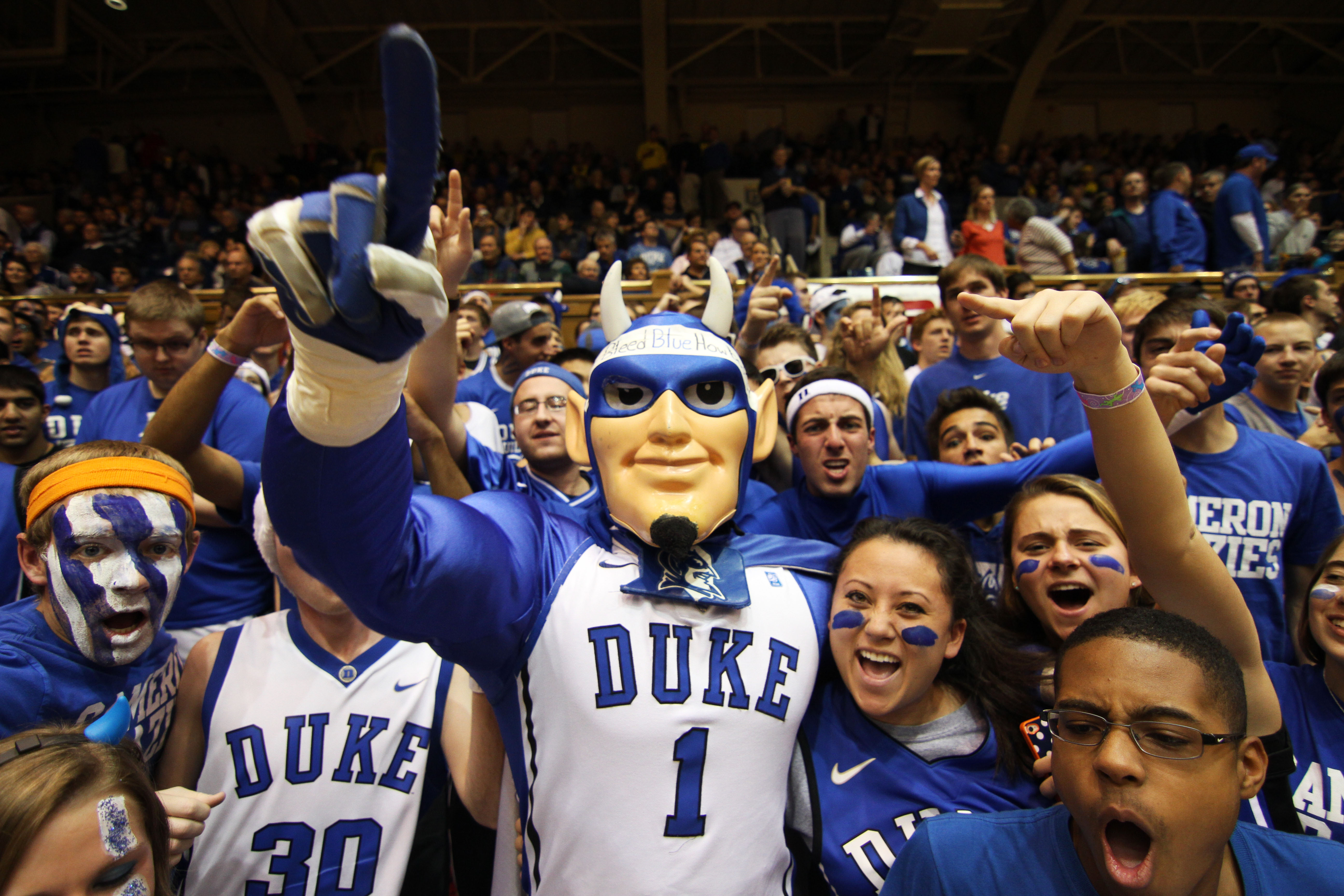
- The Blue Devil with the Cameron Crazies in 2013
- University: Duke University
- Conference: ACC
- Description: Costumed human character
- Origin of name: Chasseurs Alpins
- First seen: 1929

The Blue Devil is the mascot of the Duke Blue Devils of Duke University. He is depicted as a humanoid character wearing a blue and white cape with the team’s logo on it and a blue mask with white horns, he usually wears a white tape on his forehead that features a message written on it.

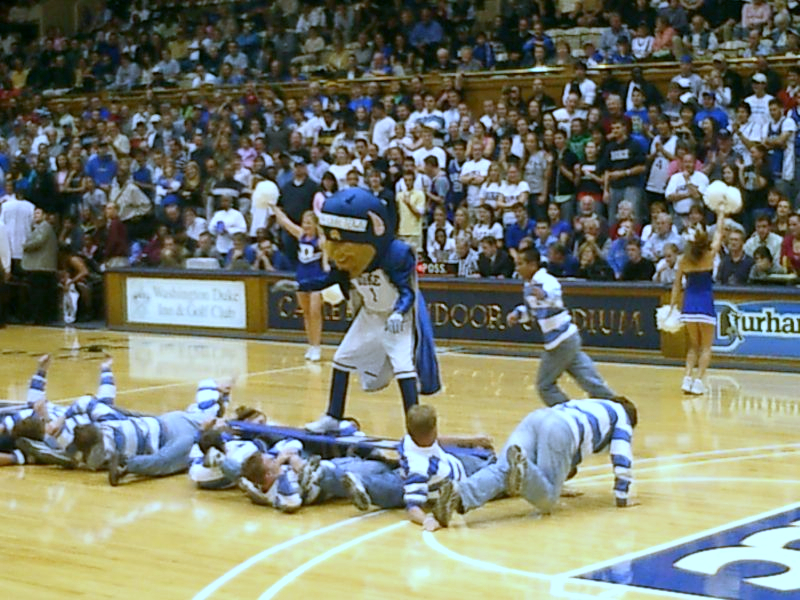
The Blue Devil "surfing" during a break in a Duke men's basketball game

== History ==
As World War I ended, Duke's Board of Trustees, then were called the "Trinity College Board of Trustees", lifted their quarter-century ban on football on campus, leading to an interest in naming the athletic teams. The team was then known as the Trinity Eleven, the Blue and White, or the Methodists (as opposed to the Baptists of nearby rival Wake Forest University). Because of the ambiguity, the student newspaper, the Trinity Chronicle (now called The Chronicle) launched a campaign to create a new mascot. Nominations for a new team name included Catamounts, Grizzlies, Badgers, Dreadnaughts, and Captains. The Trinity Chronicle editor narrowed the many nominations down to those that utilized the school colors of dark blue and white. The narrowed list consisted of Blue Titans, Blue Eagles, polar bears, Blue Devils, Royal Blazes, and Blue Warriors. None of the nominations proved to be a clear favorite, but the name Blue Devils elicited criticism that could potentially engender opposition on campus. These fears were partly alleviated when it was revealed that the name was military and patriotic rather than anti-religious; the name actually refers to the Chasseurs Alpins, also known as "les diables bleus" ("The Blue Devils"), a French military unit which had impressed many Duke students and alumni returning home from the Western Front. The nickname of the Chasseurs Alpins was derived from the blue jacket and blue-grey breeches worn as part of their World War I-era uniform. Even with this explanation, however, that year's football season passed with no official selection.

During the 1922–1923 academic year, campus student leaders and the editors of the two other student publications, The Archive and The Chanticleer, decided that the newspaper staff should decide the name on their own because the nomination process had proved inconclusive. Editor-in-chief William H. Lander and managing editor Mike Bradshaw began referring to the athletic teams as the Blue Devils. Though the name was not officially used that year, no opposition to the name arose. The Chronicle's staff continued to use the name and eventually "Blue Devils" became the official mascot and nickname of the Duke athletics program.

== See also ==
- List of college mascots in the United States
- Rameses (mascot)
