= Buster Bronco (Western Michigan) =

Western Michigan University mascot

- Buster Bronco at a men's home basketball game.
- University: Western Michigan University
- Conference: Mid-American Conference
- Description: Bronco
- First seen: 1982

Buster Bronco is the official Mascot of Western Michigan University athletic teams. "Born" in 1981, Buster is an official member of the WMU Cheer Team. Along with cheering at Bronco athletic events, Buster also makes appearances at community schools, hospitals, libraries and parades.

Initially Buster was a student dressed in a horse's head. The athletic department formerly adopted Buster in 1988 and the mascot attended Western Michigan's 1988 MAC Championship win. After a few changes, the current Buster Bronco took the form seen today in 2017.

WMU mascot Buster Bronco watches players during the November 13, 2026 game at Lawson Arena

== Bobble head ==
A Buster Bronco bobblehead was unveiled by the National Bobblehead Hall of Fame and Museum in preparation for the 2026 National Bobblehead day. The run of bobbleheads is a limited edition and individually sequenced with only 2,026 being made.

== See also ==
- List of U.S. college mascots
