= Petey (mascot) =

- University: Canisius College
- Conference: MAAC
- Description: Anthropomorphic golden griffin
- First seen: 1967

Petey is the mascot for the Canisius Golden Griffins, the athletic teams of Canisius College in Buffalo, New York, USA. He is an anthropomorphic golden griffin who performs live at all Canisius athletic events. Canisius adopted the nickname "Golden Griffins" for their school athletic teams in 1932, in honor of Great Lakes explorer La Salle's ship, Le Griffon. Canisius first used an unnamed costumed griffin as a sideline mascot in 1967. In preparation for the 2002–2003 athletic season, the griffin mascot was completely redesigned and given a new costume and name. The name "Petey" was chosen as a reference to St. Peter Canisius, who Canisius College is named for.

Canisius' golden griffin has been called one of the most unusual of all NCAA mascots. In 2010, after the College of William & Mary adopted the Griffin as their new school mascot, Petey "wrote" a satirical open letter to the William & Mary griffin that was published in USA Today, welcoming the new griffin mascot to the college mascot community.

In 2013, the Catholic website Busted Halo held a March Madness-style competition to determine the title of "Best Catholic Mascot" through online voting. Petey won the online tournament, besting a field of 32 Catholic school mascots, including Notre Dame's Leprechaun and Boston College's Baldwin the Eagle. The following year, Petey advanced to the Final 4 of the same Busted Halo contest, but was ultimately defeated by Iggy the Royal Wolf from the University of Scranton. In 2015 Petey was entered in to the College Court Report "Mascot Mayhem" contest, where he made it to the Final 4 - surpassing Butler, North Florida, St. Louis, and UNLV. Sam the Minuteman from the University of Massachusetts Amherst claimed the 1st place prize. In 2016 Petey faced off against Boomer from Missouri State in the semi-finals of Court Report's "Mascot Mayhem" contest. Over 7,000 votes were cast in the final contest pairing, and Petey was narrowly defeated by a margin of 56.8% to 43.2%, claiming the 2nd place title.
