= Rufus the Bobcat =

Mascot for the Ohio Bobcats

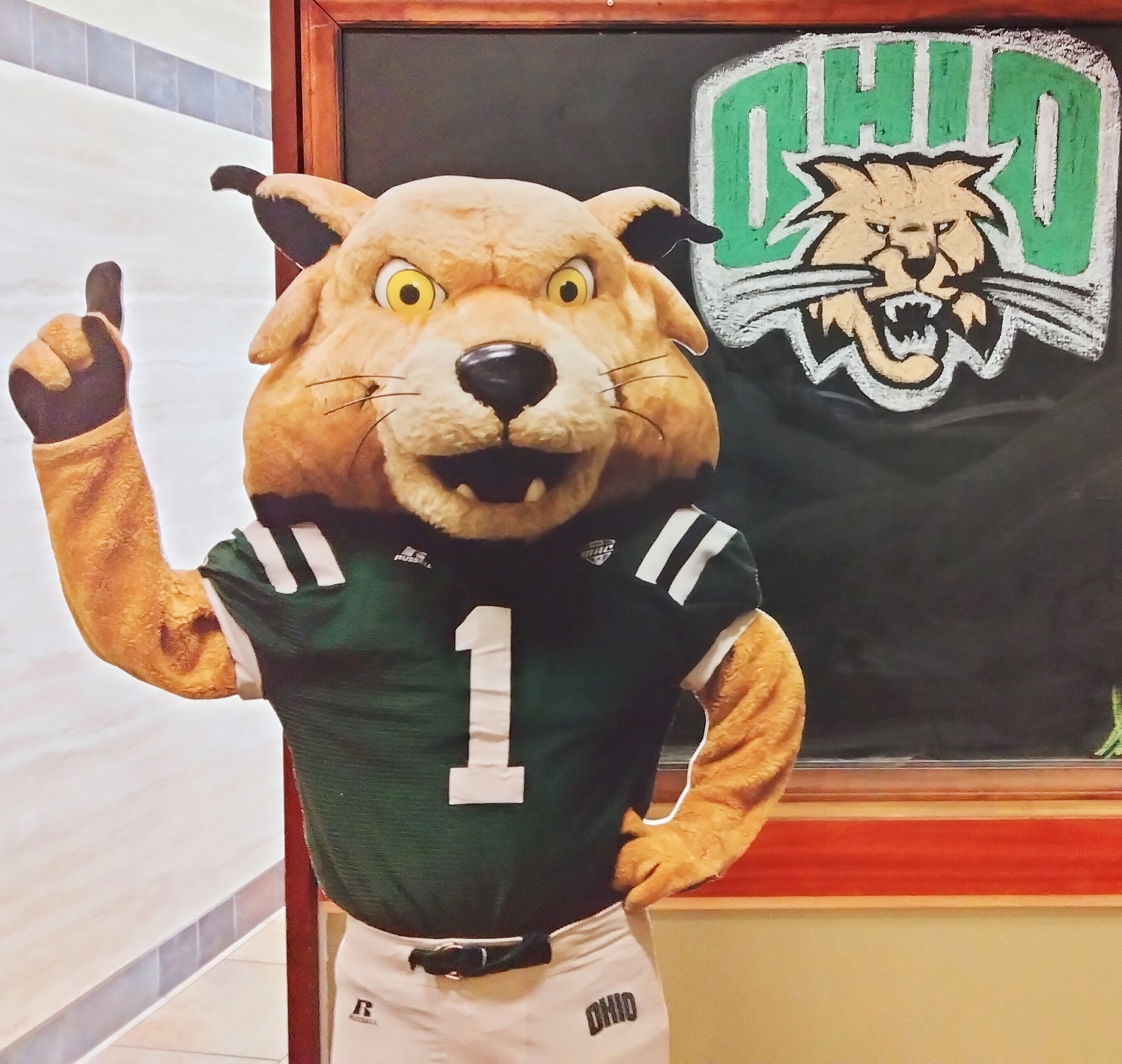
- Rufus Bobcat at a chalkboard
- University: Ohio University
- Conference: MAC
- Description: Bobcat
- Origin of name: 2006 name competition winner
- First seen: 1925

Rufus the Bobcat is the mascot for the Ohio Bobcats. The Bobcat mascot first appeared as the official Ohio University mascot in 1925, but it was not until September 2, 2006, the athletic department revealed the mascot's new name "Rufus" during a ceremony before the Bobcats' victory over Tennessee-Martin.

== First use of Bobcats ==
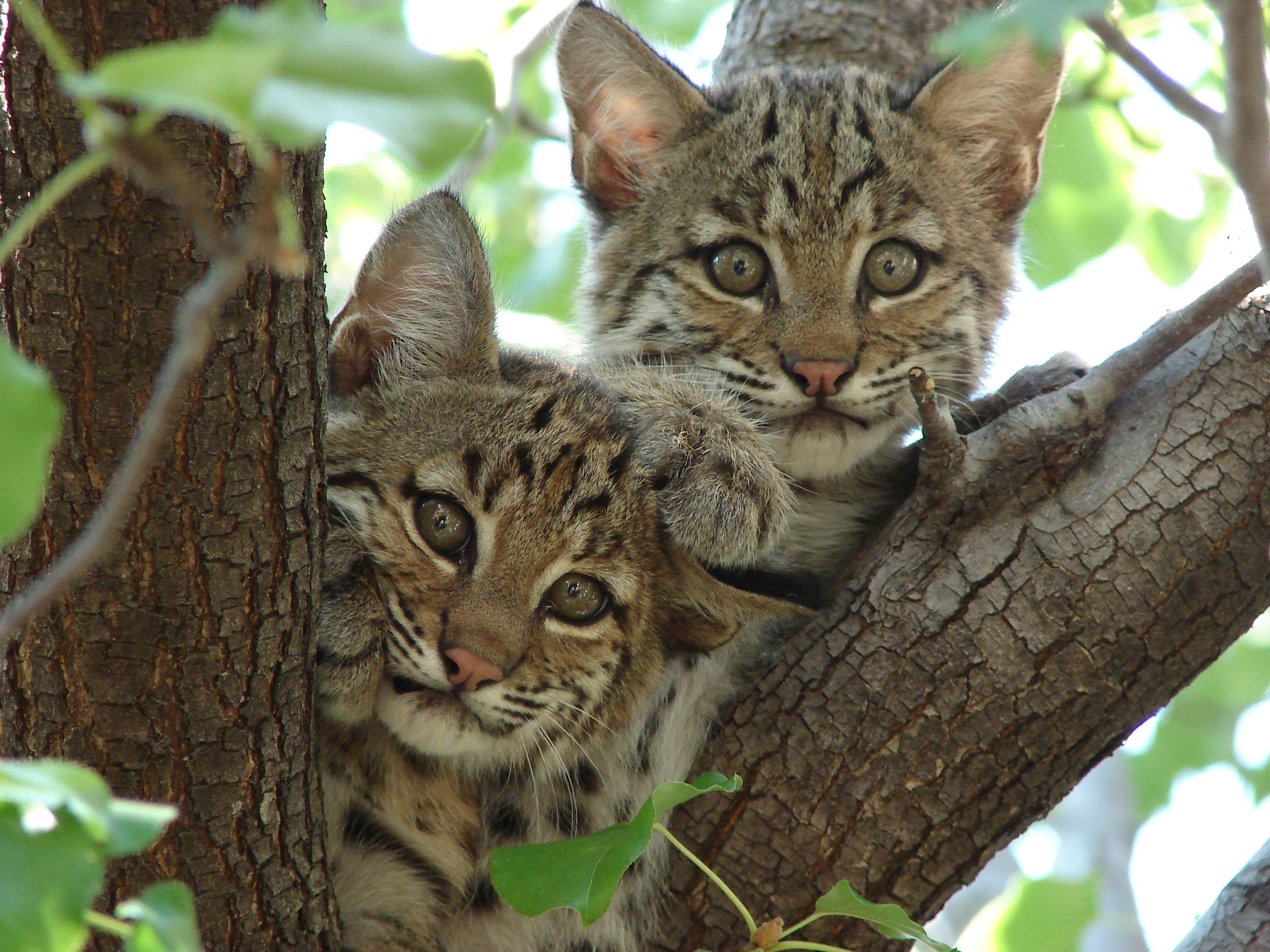
Bobcats are strictly wild animals. These 2–4 month-old kittens live out of a tree like many bobcat babies. Rufus has helped efforts to prevent hunting and endangerment.

In 1925, the members of the Ohio Athletic Board thought of an official nickname for Ohio University to replace "Ohio," the "Green and White" and "The Nameless Wonders." The board members decided to begin a contest soliciting name suggestions for the Athletic teams of Ohio University and offered a $10 prize for the suggestion that best showed the fighting spirit of Ohio. Hundreds of ideas poured in, but it was "Bobcat," suggested by Hal H. Rowland, a former student and Athens resident, that suggested the winning name. The bobcat's regal stature in Appalachia made its selection a highlight of Ohio University's strategic partnership with the region.

== Mr. Bobcat and his design ==
"Although the university finally had a mascot, it didn’t acquire a name until decades later. For decades the mascot was simply the Bobcat, and in 1960, 'Mr. Bobcat' was created by the men of Lincoln Hall." Thereafter, the Mr. Bobcat mascot first appeared at Ohio's Homecoming game against the Miami Redhawks on October 22, 1960. That day, the Ohio football team overcame archrival Miami with a 21–0 victory. They went on to achieve arguably the university's greatest football season ever. The Bobcats finished 10–0 that year and were voted the NCAA National College Division Champion.

The task of designing the Bobcat mascot costume was given to Tom Schantz. The outfit he created included a very green hand-knit sweater with 'OHIO' emblazoned in white across the front, and was literally topped off by a large papier-mâché head made in France. The question of who would wear the costume was complicated by the fact that the suit was hot, confining and had awkward dimensions. Dan Nichols, class of '63, was the first Bobcat mascot and began the tradition that the person donning the costume must live in Lincoln Hall, a tradition that lasted for several decades. The Campus Affairs Committee decided that the Bobcat mascot would be a permanent member of the cheerleading squad and would be present at all football and basketball games. A permanent life-size sculpture of The Bobcat is located in front of the Sook Athletic Center, Peden Stadium.

== Rufus nomenclature ==
In early 2006, Ohio University alumnus Michael A Massa, a class of 1982 communications graduate, penned a letter to the athletics department suggesting that the university provide a proper name and identity to the generic bobcat mascot, for branding purposes. The university Athletic Department then held a campus-wide competition to select a formal name. There were more than 500 submissions nominated for the name of the new Bobcat in May. Fans then participated in a naming contest on www.ohiobobcats.com from June through August, the chosen name of the Bobcats' new mascot was Rufus. The winner of the naming contest, Alicia Lagana (BSJ '90, MS '92, now Alicia Anderson-Lasker) of Hilliard Ohio, was recognized at the Ohio University home game versus Bowling Green on September 30, 2006.

Rufus was the popular choice for many fans because Lynx rufus is the species name for the bobcat. Other fans made the connection with Rufus Putnam, who presided over the meeting to form the Ohio Company of Associates that resulted in the founding of Ohio University. Rufus Putnam was also on the first board of trustees at the university from 1804 to 1824, and was given the honor with the naming of Putnam Hall in 1926.

== Brutus tackling ==
Beginning a statewide fandom rivalry, Rufus gained both fame and notoriety through his "legendary" tackling of Brutus Buckeye.

On September 18, 2010, the Bobcats football team played the Ohio State Buckeyes in Columbus. As the Buckeyes were running onto the field, Brandon Hanning, dressed as Rufus, charged into the field. Hanning sideswiped and attempted to tackle Brutus Buckeye, but was unsuccessful and ended up losing his Bobcat head in the process. Upon returning to his feet, Hanning donned the head again, then ran after Brutus and jumped on his back and continued to hit the mascot in the head. Hanning was then pulled aside by security who told him to cut it out. The incident garnered national attention. Neither of the mascots were injured during the event. After the game, Hanning was terminated from his position as Ohio's mascot, and was banned from attending Ohio home athletic events. The game score went 43–7 in the Buckeyes' favor.

In a post-game interview, Hanning explained that this was his sole purpose in trying out to be the mascot. "It was actually my whole plan to tackle Brutus when I tried out to be mascot," Hanning explained, "I tried out about a year ago, and the whole reason I tried out was so I could come up here to Ohio State and tackle Brutus." While many thought this was Rufus' first offense against rival school's mascots, Hanning stated "Before this, I actually got in a fight with the Buffalo mascot. He's a bull. I started it. I was thinking I should go ahead and try out tackling another mascot. I brought a red square cape thing, like in a bullfight. He was just playing around, acting like he was charging me. I tackled him and put him on the ground. It was pretty funny. No one got upset because it wasn't Ohio State."

Following the game the Columbus Dispatch published a cartoon of a scrawny Brutus mascot lifting weights next to a picture of their next opponent's mascot in reference to being taken by surprise by Rufus the game before.

== Reunion with Brutus (2025) ==
On September 13, 2025, Rufus returned to Ohio Stadium when Ohio University's Bobcats faced the Ohio State Buckeyes — the first football meeting between the schools since the 2010 mascot incident.

In the days before the game, Rufus had posted cryptic images and messaging on social media, including a photo of the stadium from within with the text “Daddy’s Home” and references to Ohio University's history as the first university in Ohio. An Ohio University spokesperson stated that Rufus would appear at the game and likely make fun of the event.

During the second quarter, the two mascots performed two staged skits. In the first, footage of the original 2010 tackle was displayed on the scoreboard while Rufus entered the field carrying a mock WWE Championship belt. Brutus entered to John Cena's “The Time Is Now.” A referee separated the mascots before they competed in a tug-of-war, which Brutus won to even the score at 1–1.

In a subsequent 100-yard dash, Brutus again prevailed and claimed the championship belt. He then raised Rufus's hand in a show of sportsmanship, and both mascots led the crowd in an “O-H-I-O” chant.

At halftime, during the joint performance by the Ohio State University Marching Band and Ohio University's Marching 110, Rufus and Brutus made a joint appearance. The mascots ran onto the field, met at midfield, and walked together arm-in-arm down the center between the two bands, symbolizing reconciliation of the rivalry.

== Rufus's major activities ==
Rufus has grown from his courtside profile further by becoming a beacon of spirit for alumni, charities, and university campaigns. The unveiling ceremony began with a video of the mascot interacting with the football team and head coach Frank Solich, culminating with Rufus roaring into Peden Stadium on a Harley-Davidson motorcycle. In October 2014, coinciding with a major space conference being held on campus, Rufus the Bobcat was the first college mascot name to venture into deep interstellar space, after his name was submitted by Michael Massa to be included among the names of other individuals on a registry to be transported on board the Mars regionally bound Orion NASA test Spacecraft. In 2017, Rufus' name was also included on the actual NASA spacecraft entitled "Insight", which was slated to land on Mars, being the first university mascot's name to be included in the voyage to another planet. In 2018, after an international space conference had been held on campus, Rufus the Bobcat was the first college mascot's name to venture into deep outer space aboard an unmanned NASA spacecraft, carrying a CD library of names. In 2020, Ohio University launched its first actual space satellite "Bobcat-1" aboard NASA's Antares rocket, to the International Space Station.
