= Bruce Ducker =

American writer

- Born: 1938 (age 87–88); New York City, U.S.
- Education: Dartmouth College; Columbia University
- Occupations: Novelist; short story writer; poet

Bruce Ducker (born 1938) is a prize-winning American novelist, short story writer, and poet.

Born in Brooklyn, NY. Ducker was educated at Dartmouth and Columbia. He has written eight novels and a volume of short stories. His poetry and short fiction appear in such journals as The New Republic, The Yale Review, Poetry, Commonweal, The Southern Review and The Hudson Review. Recent stories have appeared in The Missouri Review, The Sewanee Review, Shenandoah, the American Literary Review and Ascent. His most recent books are his eighth novel, Dizzying Heights from Fulcrum, which was nominated for the James Thurber Prize for American Humor; and The Home Pool: Stories of Fly Fishing and Lesser Passions, with illustrations by Western artist Duke Beardsley from Stackpole Books, which was runner-up for the Colorado Book Award.

His novel Lead Us Not Into Penn Station has won the Colorado Book Award, and was runner-up for the American Library Association Best Book Award. His work has won praise including that of novelists James Salter and Warwick Downing, and humorist Dave Barry.

== Bibliography ==
- Home Pool: Stories of Fly Fishing and Lesser Passions (Stackpole Books, 2008)
- Dizzying Heights: The Aspen Novel (Fulcrum Books, 2008)
- Mooney in Flight (MacAdam/Cage, 2003)
- Bloodlines (Permanent Press, 2000)
- Lead Us Not Into Penn Station (Permanent Press, 1995)
- Marital Assets (Permanent Press, 1993)
- Bankroll (E. P. Dutton, 1989)
- Failure at the Mission Trust (Freundlich Books, 1986)
- Rule by Proxy (Crown, 1975)

== See also ==
- Gordon Lish (Bruce Ducker is a former protégé of Lish)
