= Baldwin the Eagle =

Mascot of Boston College

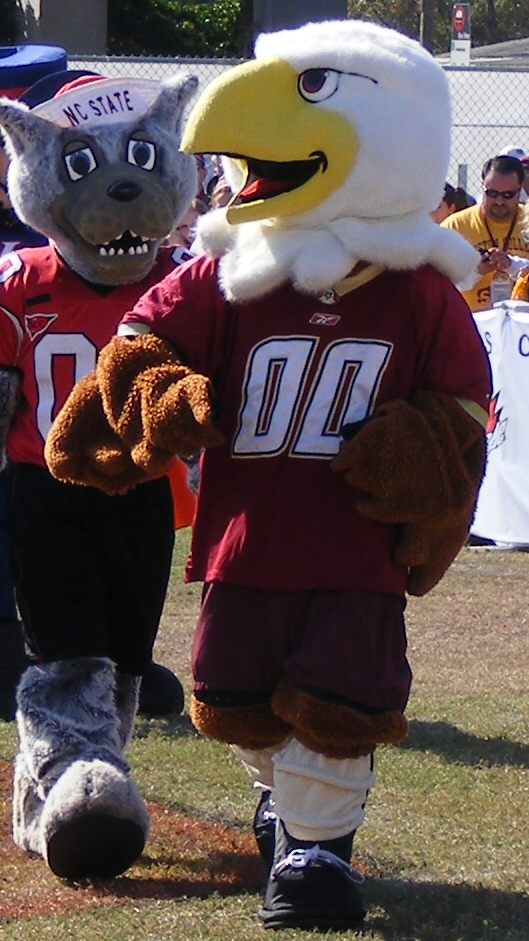
- Baldwin the Eagle in front of NC State's mascot, Mr. Wuf
- University: Boston College
- Conference: ACC
- Description: Anthropomorphic bald eagle
- Origin of name: Bald (as in eagle) and win
- First seen: 1966
- Related mascot(s): Baldwin Jr.

Baldwin the Eagle, an anthropomorphized bald eagle, is the mascot of the Boston College Eagles.

The nickname "Eagles" goes back to 1920 when Rev. Edward McLaughlin, unhappy at seeing a newspaper cartoon which represented Boston College as a cat after a track victory, wrote to the college newspaper The Heights:

It is important that we adopt a mascot to preside at our pow-wows and triumphant feats.... And why not the Eagle, symbolic of majesty, power, and freedom? Its natural habitat is the high places. Surely the Heights is made to order for such a selection. Proud would the B.C. man feel to see the B.C. Eagle snatching the trophy of victory from old opponents, their tattered banner clutched in his talons as he flies aloft.

== Live birds-of-prey ==
The "Eagles" nickname stuck. Soon a pair of golden eagles from Texas and New Mexico were given to the college as gifts. However, one escaped and the other broke its beak trying. For the next four years, the official "mascot" was a stuffed golden eagle located in the athletic offices.

In 1961, another attempt was made at a live mascot when the college adopted a 10-month-old golden eagle named "Margo" (so named because the team colors are maroon and gold). Margo lived at the Franklin Park Zoo and was brought to all home games for several years until dying of a virus early in the 1966 season.

In 2013, new athletic director Brad Bates brought back the live eagle tradition, bringing in an eagle during half time of football games. After a fan contest to decide what to call the Eagle, it was named "Welles" after Welles Crowther, the hero who died helping others during the September 11 attacks; a BC alum. Welles made sparing appearances in 2013 and 2014, sometimes not being able to attend the games due to inclement weather, late start times, etc.

== Costumed mascot ==
By the time Margo (BC's live eagle mascot) died in 1966, eagles had become endangered species and the university then opted to go to a costumed mascot. In 2000, with the unveiling of the current athletics logos, the Boston College Eagle mascot received a visual makeover as well and has appeared that way since. Also, the mascot officially got the name "Baldwin"—a combination of the words "Bald" (as in bald eagle) and "win." There is also a 9.5 foot inflatable mascot named "Baldwin, Jr." which appears at games. Like many modern costumed mascots, Baldwin wears replica team uniforms at events.

Baldwin the Eagle is brought to life by an anonymous team of Boston College students that are chosen by audition. They are allowed to reveal their role upon graduation from Boston College.

== Gilded statue ==
Another incarnation of the Boston College Eagle is a gilded bronze eagle sculpture that diplomat Larz Anderson and Isabel Weld Perkins, his socialite heiress wife, brought back from Japan in the early 20th century. The eagle remained in Larz Anderson Park until 1954 when it was donated to Boston College and became synonymous with the BC Eagle, where it overlooks Linden Lane.

== See also ==
- List of U.S. college mascots
