= Keggy the Keg =

Unofficial mascot of Dartmouth College

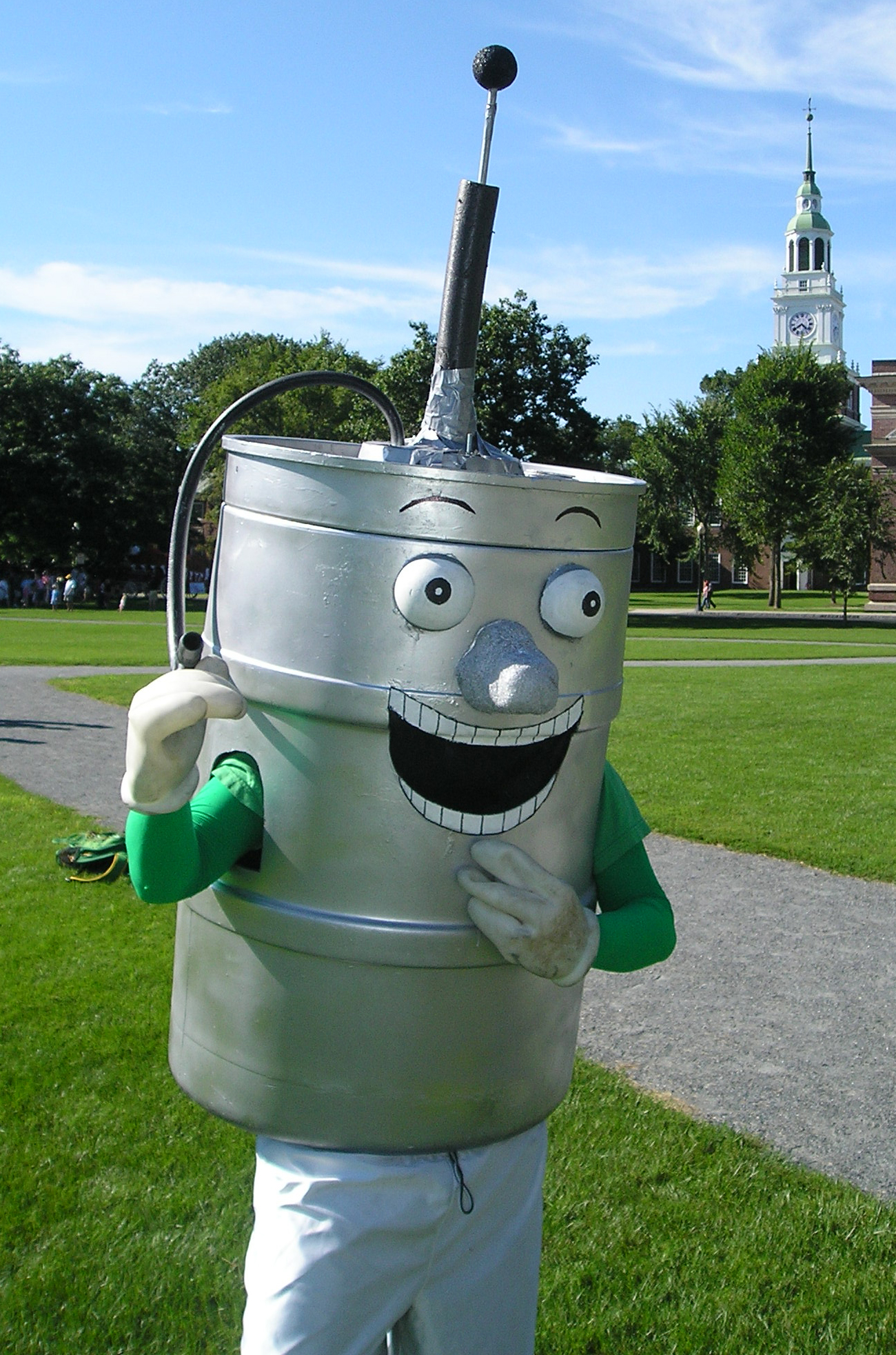
Keggy posing on the Dartmouth College Green with Baker Memorial Library in the background.

Keggy the Keg is the unofficial mascot of Dartmouth College, an Ivy League college in Hanover, New Hampshire, United States. Keggy is an anthropomorphic beer keg, created in 2003 by members of the college humor magazine the Dartmouth Jack-O-Lantern, to fill the mascot void that followed the abolition of the unofficial Native American mascot in 1974. Due to its nature, the mascot was controversial on Dartmouth's campus, and it was reported on in a variety of national media. With time, however, it has become an "ingrained part of Dartmouth culture".

== Context and creation ==
After dropping the mascot of the Indian, Dartmouth had no official mascot. Dartmouth continued to be known by its nickname of "The Big Green," but, citing the ambiguity, lack of dynamism, and intangibility of having no mascot, the Dartmouth Student Assembly proposed a student poll in spring 2003 to decide upon a new mascot. While the Moose came in first in this poll, many students remained dissatisfied with the choice, and the moose lost a final poll to "no mascot." Chris Plehal and Nic Duquette, students at the Jack-O-Lantern humor magazine, expressed interest in creating a mascot that "wasn't racist, biased or sexist, yet [was] entirely unacceptable." In an effort to force the administration to adopt a more interesting mascot, they created Keggy, an anthropomorphic keg that represents "the most obvious Dartmouth stereotype: the beer-swilling Animal House fraternity culture."

== Reactions ==
Reaction to Keggy's introduction was mixed: the student body president personally endorsed Keggy in the mascot search, while the College newspaper The Dartmouth reported a mixed student reaction and published opposing opinions. The paper also reported on "flak" over the mascot from College administrators, though the Dean of the College lauded the students' capacity to "come up with imaginative and creative ideas."

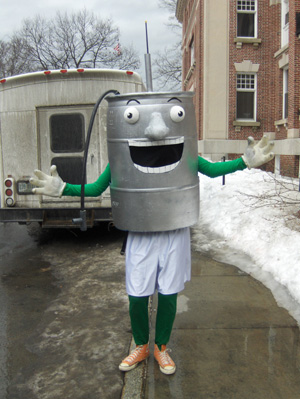
The new incarnation of Keggy, as revealed at Winter Carnival 2009

Keggy subsequently received media attention beyond the College at other Ivy League newspapers and on several national media outlets. Michael Wilbon of ESPN's Pardon the Interruption called Keggy "some stupid beer thing," and Playboy magazine published a feature on Keggy as part of a "Mascots Talk Back" series. A posting of a photo of Keggy on CollegeHumor was popular enough to receive status as a National Pick. In August, 2012 Yahoo Sports ranked Keggy the Keg as the #1 Most Unique Mascot.

== History ==
Shortly after Keggy's introduction in 2003, a group of students stole the Keggy costume from its home in the Sigma Nu fraternity library and sent threatening notes to Keggy's creators, including photographs of the mascot bound and gagged with one black eye. Some thought this to be a publicity stunt by the creators, but the mascot had truly been stolen. Keggy was eventually returned with minor damage to the costume.

Keggy continued to make occasional appearances at Dartmouth sporting events, and became an "ingrained part of Dartmouth culture": at Dartmouth's 2005 Winter Carnival celebration, students named the snow sculpture of a large ship "Captain Keggy's Carnival Cruiser." In early 2006, College officials denied Keggy entrance to a sold-out hockey game (officials cited fire code concerns with the capacity crowd), prompting a Jack-O-Lantern-penned editorial in The Dartmouth condemning the incident; the Jack-O-Lantern website alleged "anti-keg racism." A similar incident occurred in October 2006 when Keggy was not permitted on the field at halftime of the Homecoming football game, again resulting in further complaints in The Dartmouth and on the Jack-O-Lantern website.

The costume disappeared before the fall term of 2008 and has not been seen or returned since. The Jack-O-Lantern built a replacement costume and unveiled it at the 2009 Winter Carnival.
