= Brutus Buckeye =

Mascot of the Ohio State Buckeyes

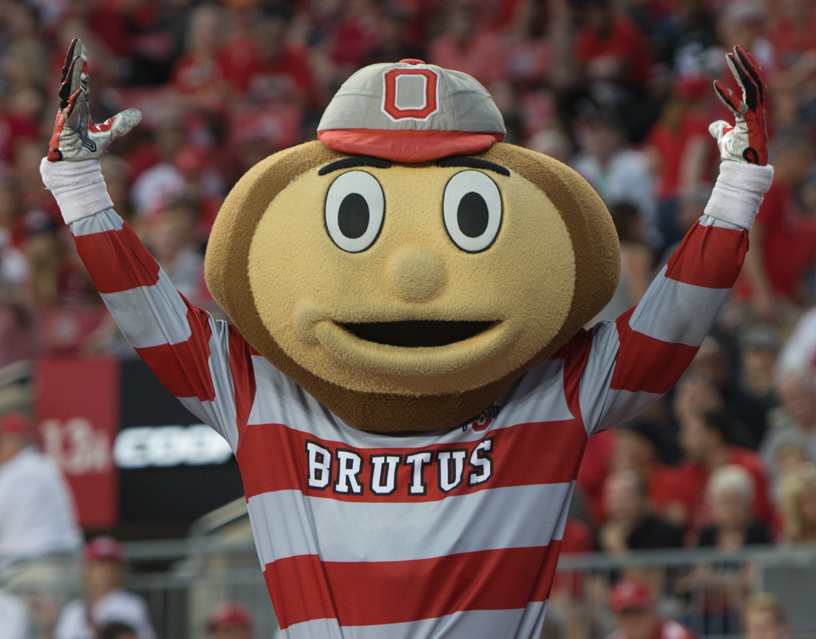
- Brutus during the Army game in 2017
- University: The Ohio State University
- Conference: Big Ten
- Description: Anthropomorphic buckeye nut
- Origin of name: Winning entry in competition
- First seen: 1965

Brutus Buckeye is the athletics mascot of Ohio State University and an anthropomorphic buckeye nut. Brutus made his debut in 1965, with periodic updates to design and wardrobe occurring in the years since. As a member of the spirit squad, Brutus Buckeye travels to many events around the university and often makes appearances around Columbus.

== History ==
Ohio State students Ray Bourhis and Sally Huber decided Ohio State needed a mascot in 1965 and convinced the athletic council to study the matter. At the time, mascots were generally animals brought into the stadium or arena. A buck deer was contemplated, but, because bringing live animals as mascots was common at the time, this was rejected as impossible. Instead, the buckeye was selected, as the buckeye is the official state tree of Ohio. A simple papier-mâché nut was constructed by students, worn over the head and torso, with legs sticking out. It made its appearance at the Minnesota vs. Ohio State homecoming football game on October 30, 1965. The heavy papier-mâché nut did not last and it was soon replaced by a fiberglass shell. On November 21, 1965, The Columbus Dispatch reported that judges picked Brutus Buckeye to be the new mascot's name after a campus-wide "Name the Buckeye" contest. The winning name was the idea of then Ohio State student Kerry J. Reed, 21. "Block O" agreed to care for Brutus in December. In the early 2000s, the Brutus costume was stolen before a game. The mascot was forced to wear the old costume.

Brutus has a buckeye head and block O hat, scarlet and grey shirt emblazoned "Brutus" and "00", red pants with an Ohio State towel hanging over the front, and high white socks with black shoes. Male and female students both serve as Brutus Buckeye.

== Appearances ==
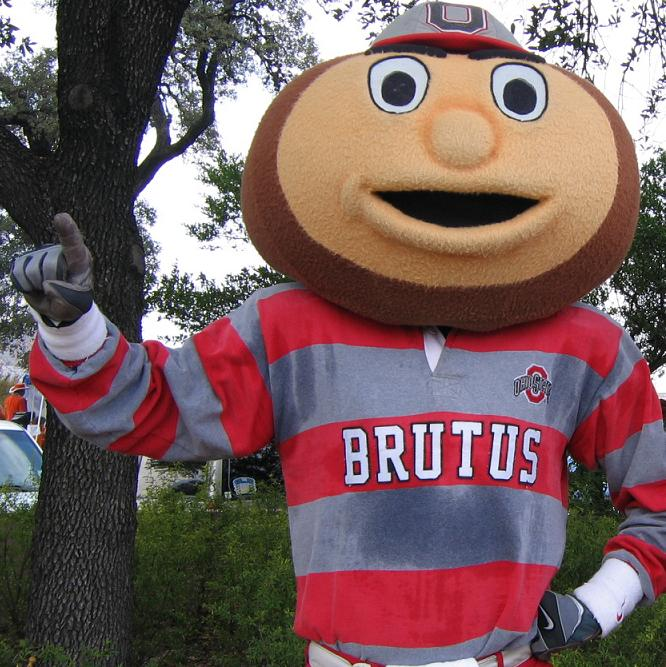
Brutus in Austin, Texas, before a football game against the Texas Longhorns

- Brutus Buckeye appears in ESPN This Is SportsCenter advertisements eating lunch and performing aerobics with Richard Simmons.
- Brutus appears strapped to the back of a truck in Home Depot commercials advertising Glidden paint.
- Brutus appears in the NCAA Football series and NCAA March Madness series of video games as a mascot and has his own mascot team.
- During the 2002–2003 NCAA football season, Brutus was 1 of 12 contestants competing to be the Capital One National Mascot of the Year. Brutus appeared in approximately 4 commercials depicting the faux competition between the 12 mascots. He appeared again for the 2010–11 NCAA football season, this time with fifteen other mascots and then again in the 2011–12 NCAA football season.
- In 2006, Brutus appeared on The Daily Show's Midwest Midterm Midtacular as a guest correspondent and was interviewed by Jon Stewart. In the middle of the interview, Brutus is caught and eaten by a giant squirrel, a play on the idea that he is a nut.
- Brutus was the subject of a comic series from the College of Pharmacy at the University entitled "Adventures in Pharmacy". Episodes depicted Brutus as a patient stricken with common household illnesses including the influenza, gout, and the common cold. Adventures in Pharmacy was created as a community service by the Ohio State College of Pharmacy, the Department of Athletics, and Columbus Public Schools. One of the goals of this program was to educate students about the role pharmacists play in health care and the treatment of common illnesses.

== 2010 tackling ==
On September 18, 2010, the Ohio Bobcats football team played the Ohio State Buckeyes in Columbus. As the Buckeyes were running onto the field, Brandon Hanning, dressed as Rufus the Bobcat, saw Sean Stazen, dressed as Brutus Buckeye, leading the charge. Hanning failed in his initial sideswiping attempt on Brutus, losing his mascot head in the process. Hanning then got back on his feet, ran after Stazen, jumped on his back and continued to hit the Brutus mascot in the head. Hanning was then pulled aside by security who told him to stop. Neither mascot was injured, and Ohio State won the game.

In a post-game interview, Hanning explained that this was his sole purpose in trying out to be the mascot. "It was actually my whole plan to tackle Brutus when I tried out to be mascot," Hanning explained, "I tried out about a year ago, and the whole reason I tried out was so I could come up here to Ohio State and tackle Brutus."

After the game, Hanning was terminated from his position as Ohio University's mascot, was banned from further affiliation with the school's athletic department, and he dropped out to attend Hocking College. Ohio University issued an apology, stating they "regret the negative effect [Hanning's actions] may have on the relationship between the two schools".

== 2025 Michigan snow incident ==
During a game against the Michigan Wolverines in Ann Arbor on November 29, 2025, Brutus crossed out the M in one of the snow-covered Michigan end zones and then wrote "Ohio" in cursive. The Michigan Stadium grounds crew eventually erased what Brutus had done.

== Books ==
- Dean, Meredith; Marshall, Michelle; & Cleverley, James. The Spirit of a Buckeye: Brutus Buckeye's Lessons for Life. Cleverley Created, Ltd., Columbus, Ohio. ISBN 0-9675664-0-1.
- Bourhis, Ray; Lanyon, Sally. The Autobiography of Brutus Buckeye. Orange Frazer, Ltd., Wilmington, Ohio. ISBN 978-1939710-376.
