= 147th Regiment (United States) =

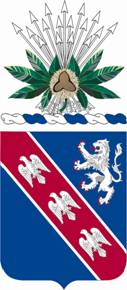
- 147th Regiment Coat of Arms
- Active: 1862–1865; 1898–1919; 1921–present
- Country: United States
- Allegiance: Ohio
- Branch: Army
- Role: Military education and training
- Size: Regiment
- Part of: Army National Guard
- Regimental Headquarters: Columbus, Ohio
- Nickname: "First Ohio"
- Motto: Cargoneek Guyoxim
- Engagements: Civil War; Virginia 1861; Shiloh; Mississippi 1862; Kentucky 1862; Murfreesboro; Chancellorsville; Gettysburg; Chickamauga; Chattanooga; Atlanta; World War I; Ypres-Lys; Meuse-Argonne; Lorraine 1918; World War II; Pacific War; Solomon Islands campaign; Guadalcanal; Northern Solomon Islands; Air Offensive, Japan; Volcano and Ryukyu Islands campaign; Battle of Iwo Jima

Commanders
- Notable commanders: Colonel F. W. Galbraith; Colonel Walter M. Johnson

Insignia
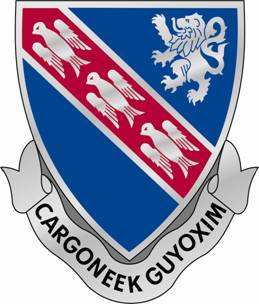
- Regimental Insignia

The 147th Regiment (Regional Training Institute) is a military education and training regiment of the Ohio Army National Guard. Previously known as the 147th Infantry Regiment and the 6th Ohio Infantry, it has served in several American wars as a combat infantry unit, but now maintains the Ohio Regional Training Institute (RTI) in Columbus, Ohio. Its regimental motto is Cargoneek Guyoxim, which is a Chippewa language phrase meaning "Always Ready." The lineage of the regiment is carried by the 174th Air Defense Artillery Regiment.

== History ==
The 147th Regiment (Regional Training Institute), previously known as the 6th Ohio Infantry, served in the Civil War, Pancho Villa Expedition, World War I, and World War II.

=== Civil War ===
The 6th Ohio was organized in southwestern Ohio in the spring of 1861 and was mustered into Federal service on 12 May. Most of its recruits were from Hamilton County and surrounding areas. The Colonel and first commander was William K. Bosley, and Nicholas Longworth Anderson of Cincinnati was its first Lieutenant Colonel. Anderson did serve as the COL of the regiment during its last two years of service. The 6th was first sent to western Virginia before mustering out when its initial three-months term of enlistment expired. Reorganized as a three-years regiment, the 6th Ohio Infantry spent the next three years in the Western Theater before being mustered out on 23 June 1864. While serving, the regiment engaged in several skirmishes and two major campaigns; Murfreesboro, and Chickamauga. Towards the end of their service, they fought in Major General William Tecumseh Sherman's Atlanta campaign.

=== Cuba, Mexico, and World War I ===
The 6th Ohio Infantry was mustered into federal service on 7 May 1898 to fight in the Spanish–American War. The Ohioans never engaged in combat with the enemy, but served in the occupation force of Cuba from 3 January – 21 April 1899. They returned to the United States and were mustered out in Cincinnati on 25 October 1899. On 19 June 1916, the Ohioans were mobilized to defend the Mexico–United States border near El Paso, Texas, where they patrolled for 9 months. They were released from federal service on 17 March 1917. This demobilization wouldn't last however, and the regiment, commanded by William Vance McMaken, was called up again 10 days later for service in World War I on 27 March 1917. The 147th Infantry Regiment was born on 25 October 1917, when the 6th Ohio absorbed elements of the 1st and 5th Ohio Regiments. It was assigned to the 37th Infantry Division, the "Buckeye" Division, and began its training at Camp Sheridan, just outside of Montgomery, Alabama. On 22 June 1918, the 74th Brigade (includes the 147th and 148th Infantry Regiments), departed from Newport News, Virginia, and arrived in France on 5 July.

After training in the Bourmont sector behind the frontline, the 147th relieved elements of the 77th Infantry Division in the Baccarat sector on 2 August 1918. This was a quiet sector, and the regiment continued to train under the tutelage of the French VI Corps. The 147th Infantry remained in the frontlines until 14 September 1918, when the 14th French Division relieved them. In the Meuse-Argonne, the 147th acted as a reserve for the 79th Infantry Division in the Avocourt sector, as a part of the US V Corps. The 37th and adjacent 79th Infantry Divisions advanced on heavy German positions and continued to push the enemy back. On 1 October, the units of the 37th Division were relieved by the 32d Infantry Division, and the 147th Infantry was relieved by elements of the 2d Infantry Division. The 147th was soon transferred to IV Corps control, where they relieved a regiment of the 89th Infantry Division on the frontline on 3 October, and remained until 11 October.

Following this assignment, the 147th traveled with the 37th Division to Hooglede, near Ypres, and took part in the Ypres-Lys starting on 31 October. Continuous advance against heavy enemy fire characterized this assault. The men of the regiment swam across the Boche River on 2 November in the face of enemy fire, and prepared to cross the Scheldt. After fighting day and night, they crossed the Scheldt, and consolidated positions on the far bank. They were relieved on the night of 4–5 November and enjoyed some rest in the town of Thielt. On 8 November they were back in the fighting, and continued to advance until the last minute. The Armistice of 11 November 1918 brought the fighting to an end, and the 147th camped at Le Mans, France until they returned home to Ohio on 19 April 1919. They were demobilized from federal service that same day.

=== Interwar period ===
The 147th Infantry arrived at the port of New York on 25 March 1919 on the troopship USS Von Steuben and was demobilized on 19 April 1919 at Camp Sherman, Ohio. Per the National Defense Act of 1920, the 147th Infantry was reconstituted in the National Guard in 1921, assigned to the 37th Division, and allotted to the state of Ohio. It was reorganized 1 July 1921 by redesignation of the 1st Infantry, Ohio National Guard (organized 1919–20; headquarters organized 11 March 1920 and federally recognized at Cincinnati, Ohio) as the 147th Infantry. The regiment, or elements thereof, called up to perform the following state duties: riot control during a coal miners’ strike at St. Clairsville, Ohio, 26 July–16 August 1922; riot control during a coal miners’ strike at Cadiz, Ohio, 16 April–17 August 1932; flood relief along the Ohio River, January–March 1937; riot control during a workers’ strike at the Mahoning Valley steel plants, 22 June–15 July 1937. Conducted annual summer training most years at Camp Perry, OH, 1921–39. Inducted into active federal service at Cincinnati on 15 October 1940 and moved to Camp Shelby, Mississippi, where it arrived on 24 October 1940.

=== World War II ===
At the beginning of US involvement in World War II, the 147th became a "lost regiment" when it was pulled out of the 37th Infantry Division to triangularize that division in 1942. The regiment went to war in the South Pacific as an independent regiment, and fought in several battles alongside a greater number of United States Marine Corps troops. The 147th first engaged in combat at Guadalcanal, where it took part in the assault on Mt. Austen. During this battle, General Alexander Patch was forced to reorganize his forces due to combat losses, and created the CAM (Composite Army-Marine) Division, which consisted of the 147th Infantry Regiment, the 182nd Infantry Regiment, and the 6th Marine Regiment, along with artillery elements from the Americal Division and the 2nd Marine Division. In early January 1943, I Company and a platoon of M Company cut off the Japanese escape routes along a 20-mile front while the CAM pushed the defenders back towards the western beach of Guadalcanal. Along the coast, the CAM Division began its attack at the same time with a three-regiment front: the 6th Marines on the beach, the 147th Infantry in the center, and the 182nd Infantry abreast of 25th Infantry Division on the left. Alternating the lead attack position, the 147th Infantry, the 182nd Infantry, and the 6th Marines progressed from one to three miles a day through weak resistance. By 8 February these units had reached Doma Cove, nine miles beyond the Poha River and the same distance short of Cape Esperance. By 9 February 1943, the Americans had cleared the island, and the 147th moved on to its next assignment.

The regiment relieved the 4th Marines on Emirau Island on 11 April 1944 and performed garrison duties until they were relieved by the 369th Infantry Regiment in June. While on Emirau, they assisted the US Navy Seabees in constructing an airfield, because the 147th was the only infantry regiment that had constructed an airfield before (at Tonga in 1942). The regiment then moved to the island of Saipan in the wake of the first landings to conduct mopping up operations behind the 2nd Marine Division, the 4th Marine Division, and the 27th Infantry Division. The island was declared secure on 9 July 1944, but Japanese resistance continued for months afterward. The 147th next moved to the island of Tinian to follow elements of the 2nd and 4th Marine Divisions as they assaulted through the island. The 147th rooted out stubborn Japanese defenders and continued fighting after the island was officially declared secure on 1 August 1944.

The regiment's next assignment proved to be their most difficult; in the spring of 1945, the Ohioans fought in the Battle of Iwo Jima. In the early days of the Marine landings, the 147th was ordered to climb from landing craft with grappling hooks to scale a high ridge about 3/4 mile from Mount Suribachi. The mission was to fire on the enemy opposing the Marine landings on the beaches below. They were soon pinned down by heavy Japanese fire, and engaged in non-stop fighting for 3 months. Once the island was declared secure, the regiment was supposed to act as a garrison force, but they soon found themselves locked in a bitter struggle against thousands of stalwart defenders engaging in a last-ditch guerilla campaign to harass the Americans. Using well-supplied caves and tunnel systems, the Japanese resisted American advances. For three months, the 147th methodically scoured the island, using flamethrowers, grenades, and satchel charges to ferret out the enemy. 1,602 Japanese were officially credited as killed, and 867 captured, with potentially thousands more sealed up in caves using explosives. Some sources credit the regiment with killing at least 6,000 Japanese soldiers in those anonymous and merciless small unit actions. In return, the 147th suffered fifteen men killed in action and 144 wounded. On 30 June 1945, the 1st Battalion boarded the USS Rockwall and was transported to the island of Tinian, where it earned the distinction of providing security for the Fat Man and Little Boy atomic bombs. The 147th went on to fight in the bloody Battle of Okinawa, once again in charge of rooting out stubborn Japanese defenders who remained even after the island was declared secure. When the war ended on 2 September 1945, the 147th Infantry was sent home piecemeal, and the last men to return home arrived in March 1946.

During World War II, the 147th Infantry Regiment fought in the battles of Guadalcanal, Saipan, Tinian, Iwo Jima, and Okinawa. These battles are often associated with the US Marines, but no Army unit other than the 147th fought in all of these battles. Aside from the combat on the battlefield, the 147th was also victim of little press coverage, fighting alongside Marines and the Navy, whose units commanded better public relations exposure.

=== Present ===
In 1994, the 147th Infantry was redesignated as the 147th Armor. The 147th Armor was consolidated with the 174th Air Defense Artillery on 1 July 2005, and its lineage perpetuated by the latter.

== See also ==
- Guthrie Greys
