= Richard C. Anderson Jr. =

American politician (1788–1826)

Richard Clough Anderson Jr.

Member of the Kentucky House of Representatives
- In office 1821–1822

Member of the U.S. House of Representatives
- In office March 4, 1817 – March 3, 1821

Member of the Kentucky House of Representatives
- In office 1815–1816

Personal details
- Born: August 4, 1788 Soldier's Retreat, Louisville, Kentucky, U.S.
- Died: July 24, 1826 (aged 37) Turbaco, Colombia
- Parent: Richard Clough Anderson Sr. (father)
- Relatives: Larz Anderson (grandson); Robert Anderson (brother); Charles Anderson (brother); George Rogers Clark (uncle); William Clark (uncle)
- Education: The College of William & Mary

Richard Clough Anderson Jr. (August 4, 1788 – July 24, 1826) was an American lawyer, politician, and diplomat from Jefferson County, Kentucky. He served as a member of the United States House of Representatives from Kentucky. He is the son of Richard Clough Anderson Sr. and the grandfather of Larz Anderson.

== Early life ==
Anderson was born at Soldier's Retreat near Louisville, Kentucky. His father, Richard Clough Anderson Sr., was a Revolutionary War Lt. Colonel in the 5th Virginia continentals, who led the advance of the Americans at the battle of Trenton (24 December 1776), crossing the Delaware River in the first boat.

Anderson attended private schools, later graduating from The College of William & Mary in Williamsburg, Virginia in 1804. He later studied law under Judge St. George Tucker and was admitted to the bar, practicing law in Louisville. His mother was Elizabeth Clark Anderson, of the Rogers Clark family. All of his uncles from his mother's side were military officers—five of them during the Revolutionary War. Two of his uncles had become quite famous: General George Rogers Clark, hero of the taking of Fort Sackville at Vincennes, IN, and considered to be the founder of Louisville, and Captain William Clark, of the Lewis and Clark Expedition. His younger brothers included civil war general Robert Anderson and Ohio Governor Charles Anderson.

== Career ==
Anderson was elected to the Kentucky House of Representatives in 1815 and then was elected as a Democratic-Republican to the United States House of Representatives in 1816 and 1818, serving in the Fifteenth and Sixteenth Congresses from March 4, 1817, through March 3, 1821. While in Congress, Anderson served as the chairman of the House Committee on Public Lands in the Sixteenth Congress. Anderson did not seek reelection to the House in 1820. He later served again as a member of the Kentucky House of Representatives in 1821 and 1822 and served as Speaker of the Kentucky House of Representatives in 1822.

Anderson was appointed as the first United States Minister Plenipotentiary to the Gran Colombia on January 27, 1823. Prior to his departure, he sold several of his slaves to improve his finances. In 1824 he negotiated with Pedro Gual and concluded the Anderson–Gual Treaty, the first bilateral treaty that the U.S. signed with another American state. Anderson took his leave from his post on June 7, 1825, after being commissioned as Envoy Extraordinary and Minister Plenipotentiary to the Panama Congress of Nations.

Anderson died en route to his post in Turbaco, near Cartagena, Colombia on July 24, 1826. He is buried at Soldier's Retreat.

=== Legacy ===
Anderson County, Kentucky is named in his honor.

U.S. House of Representatives
Preceded by Stephen Ormsby	U.S. Representative from Kentucky's 8th District; 1817 – 1821	Succeeded by Wingfield Bullock
