= Nicholas Longworth Anderson =

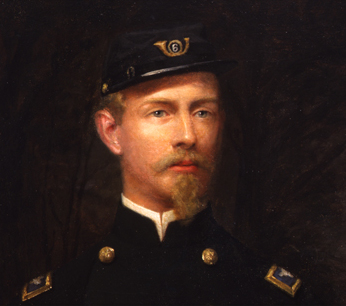
- Nicholas Longworth Anderson
- Born: April 22, 1838; Cincinnati, Ohio
- Died: September 18, 1892 (aged 54); Lucerne, Switzerland
- Burial place: Spring Grove Cemetery, Cincinnati, Ohio
- Military career
- Allegiance: United States
- Branch: United States Army; Union Army
- Service years: 1861–1865
- Rank: Colonel; Brevet Major General
- Commands: 6th Ohio Volunteer Infantry
- Conflicts: American Civil War; Battle of Perryville; Battle of Stones River; Battle of Chickamauga; Atlanta campaign

Nicholas Longworth Anderson (April 22, 1838 – September 18, 1892) was a United States Army officer who served in the American Civil War as Colonel of the 6th Ohio Volunteer Infantry. After the Civil War, he was nominated and confirmed for appointment to the brevet grades of brigadier general and major general of volunteers.

== Biography ==
Anderson graduated from Harvard College in 1858 and traveled in Europe, spending about two years in study at the German universities. He returned to Cincinnati and was studying law when the war began.

Anderson volunteered as a private in the Union Army, but soon was promoted to 1st lieutenant in the 6th Ohio Volunteer Infantry on May 12, 1861, and to lieutenant colonel on June 21 of the same year.

He was promoted to colonel in command of the regiment on November 9, 1862. He served in western Virginia and in most of the major campaigns in the Western Theater. Severely wounded twice, he mustered out of the service with the regiment on June 23, 1864.

On December 18, 1867, President Andrew Johnson nominated Anderson to receive a brevet (honorary promotion) to the rank of brigadier general of Volunteers to rank from March 13, 1865, for "gallant conduct and meritorious services in the battle of Stone's River, December 31, 1862" and the U.S. Senate confirmed the brevet on February 14, 1868. On December 19, 1867, President Johnson nominated Anderson for the award of the grade of brevet major general of U.S. volunteers, also to rank from March 13, 1865, for "distinguished gallantry and meritorious conduct in the battle of Chickamauga, September 19 and 20, 1863" and the U.S. Senate confirmed this brevet, also on February 14, 1868.

== Post war ==
General Anderson was a veteran companion of the Military Order of the Loyal Legion of the United States (MOLLUS). His son, Larz Anderson III, became an hereditary member of MOLLUS. Both father and son were also members of the Sons of the Revolution.

In 1890 he was elected to membership in the Maryland Society of the Cincinnati by right of being the grandson of Lieutenant Colonel Richard Clough Anderson, a Virginia native who served in the American Revolution. His "seat" in the society was "inherited" by his son Larz, who was elected to membership in the Maryland Society in 1894. By tradition, members of the Society of the Cincinnati join the society of the state from which their ancestor served. Although Richard Clough Anderson served from Virginia, Nicholas Longworth Anderson joined the Maryland Society because the Virginia society was inactive at that time.

Following the death of his father, Anderson spent much of the remainder of his days managing the estate he had inherited from his mother. Anderson died in Lucerne, Switzerland at age fifty-four on September 18, 1892, and is buried in Spring Grove Cemetery in Cincinnati.

== Relatives ==
Nicholas Longworth Anderson, son of Larz Anderson I and Catherine (Longworth) Anderson, was the scion of two distinguished Ohio families. Through his mother, he was the grandson of Nicholas Longworth, founder of the Longworth family. On his father's side, Nicholas Longworth Anderson was the grandson of Revolutionary War veteran, Richard Clough Anderson Sr. and the nephew of three notable uncles:

- Brigadier General Robert Anderson, a career Army officer most famous for his defense of Fort Sumter at the start of the American Civil War
- Charles Anderson, briefly Governor of Ohio
- William Marshall Anderson, lawyer and explorer

His cousin Allen Latham Anderson attained the rank of Brevet Brigadier General. Another cousin, Thomas McArthur Anderson, was a brigadier general who fought in the Spanish–American War and the Philippine–American War.

=== Wife and children ===
Nicholas Longworth Anderson married Elizabeth Coles Kilgour. Their son Larz Anderson III and daughter Elizabeth Kilgour Anderson were born while the couple was residing in Paris.

Larz served as Second Secretary to the U.S. Embassy in London under Robert Todd Lincoln and then First Secretary at the U.S. Embassy in Rome. He briefly served as a captain in the Volunteer Army during the Spanish–American War. He was appointed as U.S. Minister to Belgium from 1911–1912, and finally served briefly as Ambassador to Japan from 1912 to 1913 before retiring from public service. In 1897, Larz married Isabel Weld Perkins who later edited and published The Letters and Journals of General Nicholas Longworth Anderson: Harvard, Civil War, Washington, 1854–1892. Larz and Isabel also created the Anderson Memorial Bridge in Cambridge, Massachusetts, and dedicated it to his memory.

In 1899, Elizabeth, known to friends and family as "Elsie," married Philip Hamilton McMillan of Detroit, a Yale and Harvard educated attorney who was the son of Senator James McMillan of Michigan. After her husband's death in 1919, Elsie established The Philip Hamilton McMillan Memorial Publication Fund at Yale University through a bequest of $100,000. The Fund continues to operate under the aegis of Yale University Press.

== See also ==
- List of American Civil War brevet generals (Union)
