= Allen L. Anderson =

American Civil War officer (1837–1910)

Allen Latham Anderson
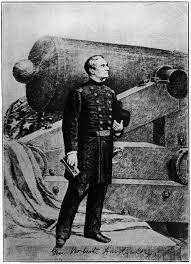
- Born: March 10, 1837; Dayton, Ohio, U.S.
- Died: June 9, 1910 (aged 73); Santa Barbara, California, U.S.
- Burial place: Kuttawa Cemetery, Kuttawa, Kentucky
- Education: United States Military Academy
- Relatives: Robert Anderson (Uncle); Nicholas Longworth Anderson (Cousin)
- Military career
- Allegiance: United States (Union)
- Branch: United States Army (Union Army)
- Service years: 1854 – 1867
- Rank: Colonel; Bvt. Brigadier General
- Units: 2nd Infantry Regiment; 5th Infantry Regiment
- Commands: 8th California Infantry Regiment
- Conflicts: American Civil War; New Mexico campaign; Battle of Valverde

Allen Latham Anderson (1837-1910) was an American brigadier general and civil engineer who commanded the 8th California Infantry Regiment during the American Civil War. He was also known for being the nephew of Robert Anderson and the cousin of Nicholas Longworth Anderson.

== Biography ==
=== Before the war ===
Allen was born on March 18, 1837, at Dayton, Ohio as the son of Charles Anderson and Eliza Jane Brown Anderson. He gained his early education around the local schools at Dayton before entering the United States Military Academy in 1854 as a cadet and graduating in the Class of 1859, ranking 16th. Initially, there were few vacancies for captains but he was eventually made Brevet 2nd Lieutenant of the 2nd Infantry Regiment before being transferred to the 5th Infantry Regiment and stationed at California after a long trip through Cape Horn.

=== American Civil War ===
Anderson was promoted to first lieutenant on May 14, 1861, when the American Civil War broke out. He was initially stationed at New Mexico due to the advances of Henry Hopkins Sibley heading for Fort Union and proceeded to participate at the Battle of Valverde. His actions at the battle earned him a promotion to brevet major for "gallant and meritorious services". He was promoted to captain on December 3, 1862, and stationed at Prescott. Anderson was then sent on an expedition into Western Arizona, where he began a campaign against Apache generals Cochise and Victorio. On March 13, 1865, he was brevetted brigadier general for "meritorious and gallant services during the War." Around the same time, Anderson held command of the 8th California Infantry Regiment during the formation of the unit.

=== Later years ===
Anderson was honorably discharged on November 10, 1865, but continued military service due to a military commission until January 7, 1867, when he resigned to pursue civil engineering and then became the Chief Engineer of the New Mexico Mining Company until 1869. Anderson returned to Ohio to become the Chief Engineer of Public Works in Cincinnati, Ohio from 1870 to the fall of 1879. He continued his engineering career as a private consultant until 1894 when his health began to fail him and moved to Southwestern Kentucky. Due to being a member of the U.S. Soldiers' Home at Santa Barbara, California, he resided there in his final years until June 9, 1910, from a pneumonia outbreak and was buried at Kuttawa Cemetery.

== See also ==
- List of American Civil War brevet generals (Union)
