= 8th California Infantry Regiment =

8th California Volunteer Infantry
- National color of the regiment
- Active: March 31, – October 24, 1865
- Country: United States
- Allegiance: Union
- Branch: Army
- Type: Infantry
- Size: 960 (total enrollment)
- Part of: Department of the Pacific
- Engagements: Industry barque disaster (Co.A)

Commanders
- Notable commanders: Colonel Allen L. Anderson

The 8th Regiment California Volunteer Infantry was an infantry regiment in the Union Army during the American Civil War. Raised in the last year of the war, it spent its entire term of service serving in posts around San Francisco Bay, and on the Columbia River, attached to the Department of the Pacific, before mustering out in late 1865.

== History ==
The regiment was mustered into Federal service on March 31, 1865, under the command of Regular Army Colonel Allen L. Anderson, attached to the District of California in the Department of the Pacific. It was the last California regiment raised under the congressional act of July 1864, and had a total enrollment of 960 in ten companies. Its headquarters was initially located at Alcatraz Island but moved to Fort Point in April. The companies of the regiment were raised during late 1864 and early 1865. Most companies did their whole service at Fort Point, Angel Island, and Alcatraz. Companies A and B were the only elements of the regiment that operated outside the Bay Area. The Civil War ended ten days after the regiment was mustered in, so the regiment did mostly garrison duty and saw little active service.

== Commander ==
- Colonel Allen L. Anderson

== Flags ==
The regimental flag is stored in the state's capitol and is one of four national colors from the California Volunteers to survive the War. It was lowered to haft mast on April 9 when Private Willian Frank's body carried by members of company G.

Company B carried their own flag but it did not fly for long. The flag was stolen by their commanding officer and sold. He was later arrested and tried by a court-martial.

== Company assignments ==
- Headquarters was at Alcatraz then moved to Fort Point.
- Company A - At Watsonville and mustered in November 17, 1864. Stationed at Fort Point, until February, 1865. At Cape Disappointment, mouth of the Columbia River, Washington Territory. On March 15, seven soldiers participated in the rescue of seven survivors from the wrecked barque Industry on March 15. They left Territory on August 17, 1865, and at Fort Dalles, Oregon, until October, 1865. Ordered to Fort Point, October, 1865.
- Company B - At Sacramento and mustered in December 5, 1864. Stationed at Fort Point until April 17, 1865. Moved to Fort Stevens, Oregon, April 17–26, and duty there until October 11. Ordered to Fort Point.
- Company C - Organized at San Jose and mustered in January 28, 1865. At Fort Point, until October, 1865.
- Company D - Organized at San Francisco and mustered in February 14, 1865. Stationed at Fort Point, until October, 1865.
- Company E - Organized at San Francisco January 25, 1865. Stationed at Alcatraz Island until October, 1865.
- Company F - Organized at San Francisco February 14, 1865. Stationed at Point Blunt, Angel Island, until October, 1865.
- Company G - Organized at Marysville and mustered in January 5, 1865. Stationed at Alcatraz Island. On April 5 Private Willian Frank was stationed at one of batterys on the island. When he was loading powder charge with a ramrod it discard into his face instantly killing him. Four days later his body was carried by 50 members of the company to the wharf, then put on a boat to be sent to his friends in Marysville to be buried. They were stationed on the island until October, 1865.
- Company H - Organized in Calaveras County and mustered in February 27, 1865, at San Francisco. Stationed at Alcatraz Island and Fort Point until October, 1865.
- Company I - Organized in Yuba and Sierra Counties and mustered in at San Francisco February 6, 1865. Stationed at Fort Point until October, 1865.
- Company K - Organized at Placerville and Sacramento and mustered in at San Francisco February 25, 1865. Stationed at Fort Point until October, 1865.

== Image Gallery ==
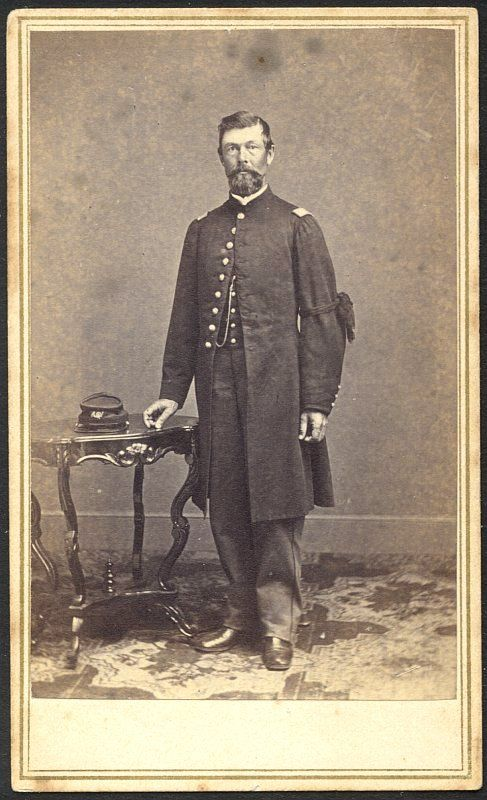

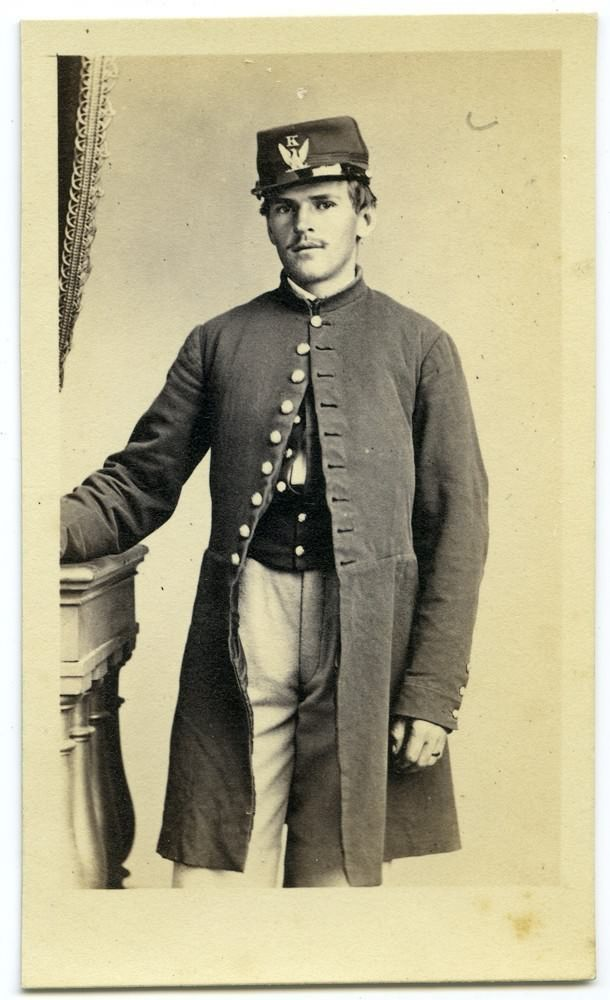

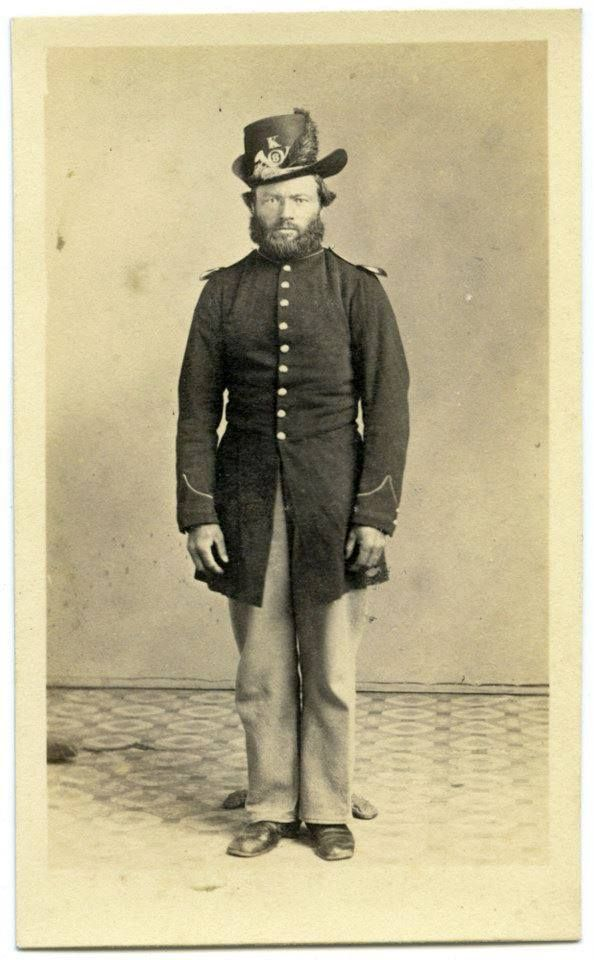

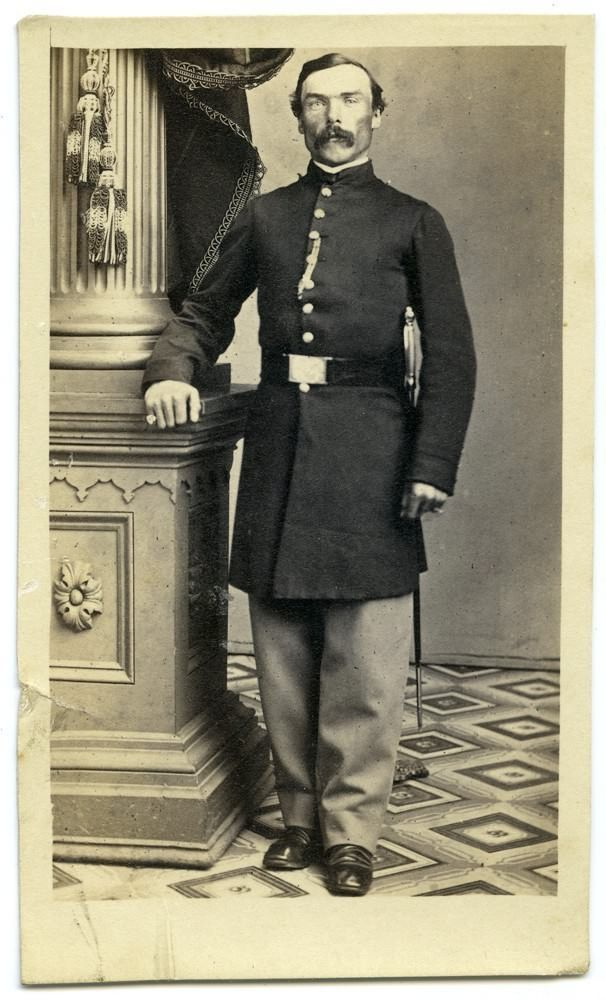

== Casualties ==
The regiment suffered five enlisted men dead, four from disease and one was killed while firing a salute.

== See also ==
- List of California Civil War Union units
