= William Marshall Anderson =

American scholar, explorer and politician

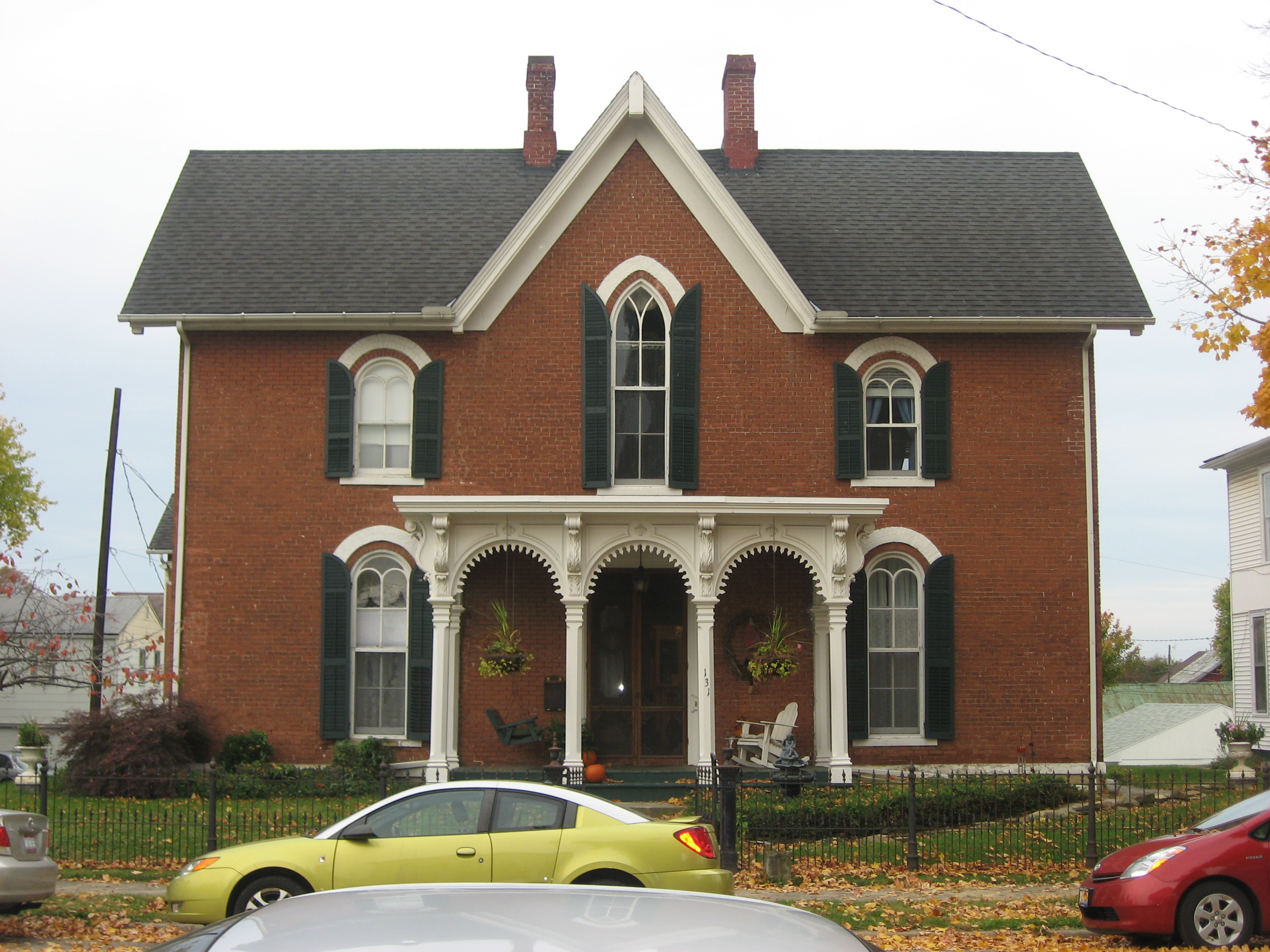
Anderson's house in Circleville, Ohio

William Marshall Anderson (1807–January 7, 1881) was an American scholar, explorer and politician, noted for his detailed travel journals in the Rocky Mountains and Imperial Mexico.

== Background ==
Anderson was born into a large and prominent family, originally from Virginia, that had settled in Kentucky and Ohio after the American Revolutionary War. His father, Richard Clough Anderson Sr., had been aide-de-camp to Lafayette at the Battle of Yorktown. His mother was cousin both to Chief Justice John Marshall and to William Clark of the Lewis and Clark Expedition. His elder brother Robert Anderson was the Major Anderson forced to surrender Fort Sumter at the start of the American Civil War. His younger brother Charles Anderson was Governor of Ohio.

In 1834, Marshall, as he was known, took a trip west with a fur-trading party and kept a journal describing his encounters with the explorers and mountain men of the time, including Kit Carson and Jim Bridger.

Returning to Ohio he set up a law practice in Chillicothe, married the daughter of former governor Duncan McArthur, ran unsuccessfully for Congress, and with his brother Larz managed legal and financial matters for the Archdiocese of Cincinnati. From at least 1839 onwards he was a devout and zealous Catholic.

In 1865, Anderson journeyed to Mexico, ostensibly on an archaeological expedition, in order to help plan the New Virginia Colony, a resettlement venture for ex-Confederates and sympathizers. The Colony was conceived and promoted by a former USN & CSN officer and internationally famous oceanographer Matthew Fontaine Maury with the support and sponsorship of Emperor Maximilian. As Napoleon III started withdrawing his French troops due to political pressure, Maximilian's government began to crumble, so did the New Virginia Colony. However, all, including Maximilian, had plenty of time to leave Mexico. Maximilian chose to stay and do the best he could with what he saw as his duty to Mexico and her people. Anderson, weakened with yellow fever, went to Vera Cruz in 1866 and took a ship back to the USA. For his remaining fifteen years he lived mostly in Circleville, Ohio, sometimes traveling on archeological explorations. His house in Circleville is on the National Register of Historic Places.

W. Marshall Anderson's son Thomas McArthur Anderson was a decorated officer in the Civil War and again many years later during the Spanish–American War and the Philippine Insurrection that followed.
