= Belle Meade =

Belle Meade can refer to:

- Belle Meade, Tennessee, a city
  - The Belle Meade Plantation located there
- Belle Meade, Memphis, a neighborhood in Memphis, Tennessee, USA
- Belle Meade, Virginia, an unincorporated community
- Belle Meade (Miami), a neighborhood within the Upper Eastside district of the city of Miami, Florida, USA

== See also ==
- Belle Mead, New Jersey
- Bellemeade, Kentucky
