= Bellemeade, Kentucky =

- City
- Location of Bellemeade in Jefferson County, Kentucky

- Location within the state of Kentucky Bellemeade (the United States)
- Coordinates: 38°15′04″N 85°35′28″W
- Country: United States
- State: Kentucky
- County: Jefferson

Area
  - Total: 0.29 sq mi (0.76 km^{2})
  - Land: 0.29 sq mi (0.76 km^{2})
  - Water: 0 sq mi (0.00 km^{2})
- Elevation: 600 ft (180 m)

Population (2020)
  - Total: 909
  - Density: 3,101.0/sq mi (1,197.29/km^{2})
- Time zone: UTC-5 (Eastern (EST))
  - Summer (DST): UTC-4 (EDT)
- ZIP Code: 40222 and 40223
- FIPS code: 21-05392
- GNIS feature ID: 2403843
- Website: bellemeade-ky.gov

Bellemeade is a home rule-class city in Jefferson County, Kentucky, United States. It was formally incorporated by the state assembly in 1956. The population was 909 at the 2020 census.

== Geography ==
Bellemeade is located in northeastern Jefferson County. It is bordered by Lyndon to the north and west, Hurstbourne to the south, and part of Louisville to the east. Downtown Louisville is 10 miles (16 km) to the west. U.S. Route 60 (Shelbyville Road) forms the southern boundary of Bellemeade.

According to the United States Census Bureau, the city has a total area of 0.29 square miles (0.76 km^{2}), all land.

== Demographics ==
Historical population
Census	Pop.	Note	%±
1960	438		—
1970	576		31.5%
1980	918		59.4%
1990	927		1.0%
2000	871		−6.0%
2010	865		−0.7%
2020	909		5.1%
U.S. Decennial Census

As of the census of 2000, there were 871 people, 412 households, and 281 families residing in the city. The population density was 3,065.8 inhabitants per square mile (1,183.7/km^{2}). There were 431 housing units at an average density of 1,517.1 per square mile (585.8/km^{2}). The racial makeup of the city was 98.51% White, 0.34% Black or African American, 0.11% Asian, 0.57% from other races, and 0.46% from two or more races.

There were 412 households, out of which 18.4% had children under the age of 18 living with them, 60.9% were married couples living together, 5.3% had a female householder with no husband present, and 31.6% were non-families. 29.4% of all households were made up of individuals, and 19.2% had someone living alone who was 65 years of age or older. The average household size was 2.11 and the average family size was 2.58.

Bellemeade has a commission form of government.

In the city, the population was spread out, with 15.5% under the age of 18, 3.3% from 18 to 24, 18.7% from 25 to 44, 28.2% from 45 to 64, and 34.2% who were 65 years of age or older. The median age was 53 years. For every 100 females, there were 82.6 males. For every 100 females age 18 and over, there were 80.4 males.

The median income for a household in the city was $54,375, and the median income for a family was $66,477. Males had a median income of $48,269 versus $32,031 for females. The per capita income for the city was $31,651. About 1.4% of families and 2.5% of the population were below the poverty line, including none of those under age 18 and 4.4% of those age 65 or over.

== See also ==
- Belle Meade
