= Thomas M. Anderson =

United States Army general

Thomas McArthur Anderson
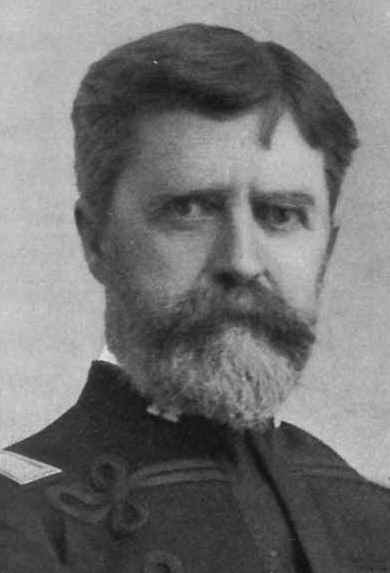
- Thomas M. Anderson
- Born: January 22, 1836; Chillicothe, Ohio, U.S.
- Died: May 8, 1917 (aged 81); Portland, Oregon, U.S.
- Burial place: Arlington National Cemetery
- Relatives: Robert Anderson, uncle Duncan McArthur, grandfather
- Military career
- Allegiance: United States of America; Union
- Branch: United States Army; Union Army
- Service years: 1861–1900
- Rank: Major General
- Conflicts: American Civil War; American Indian Wars; Spanish–American War: Battle of Manila; Philippine–American War: Battle of Manila; Battle of Santana; Battle of San Pedro; Battle of Guadalupe

Thomas McArthur Anderson (January 21, 1836 – May 8, 1917) was a career officer in the United States Army who served as a general in the Spanish–American War and the Philippine–American War.

== Biography ==
=== Early life and Civil War ===
Anderson was born in Chillicothe, Ohio, January 22, 1836. He graduated at Mount St. Mary's College in 1855, and then attended the Cincinnati Law School, earning an LL.B. degree in 1858. He was admitted to the bar in Cincinnati in 1858 and Kentucky in 1859. Anderson practiced law at Newport, Kentucky from 1858 to 1861.

When the Civil War broke out, Anderson enlisted in the volunteer army as a private in the 6th Ohio Volunteer Infantry. Under the influences of his uncle, Robert Anderson of Fort Sumter fame, he received a commission in the Regular Army as second lieutenant in the 2nd U.S. Cavalry on May 15, 1861. On Oct. 8, 1861, he was promoted to captain in the 12th U.S. Infantry. He received brevet promotions to major for the Wilderness on Aug. 1, 1864, and lieutenant colonel for Spotsylvania in August, 1864.

=== Frontier service ===
He stayed in the regular army after the war's end. He served in the 10th U.S. Infantry, 9th U.S. Infantry and finally rose to the rank of colonel of the 14th U.S. Infantry on September 6, 1886. While serving as a major with the 10th Infantry based at Fort McKavett, Texas in 1874, he participated in Colonel Ranald S. Mackenzie's campaign against the Kiowa during the Red River War.

In February 1898, Anderson and 100 soldiers of the 14th set up a base in Skagway and Dyea, Alaska at the start of the Klondike gold rush to protect miners along the trails into Canada as well as to keep watch on the border. At the start of the Spanish–American War in April 1898, he asked for and received reassignment.

=== Spanish–American War ===
Anderson was appointed brigadier general of U.S. Volunteers on May 4, 1898. He took command of the first "Philippine Expeditionary Force" during the Spanish–American War. His troops were the first to land in the Philippines following George Dewey's naval victory there. Major General Wesley Merritt had been appointed as the overall U.S. Army commander in the Philippines and arrived with the third Philippine Expeditionary Force. Merritt reorganized the three expeditionary forces into the Eighth Army Corps. Anderson was given command of the corps' 2d Division (brigade and division numbers at the time were only unique within a corps) with Brigadier Generals Francis V. Greene and Arthur MacArthur as his brigade commanders. Anderson fought at the battle of Manila against the Spanish. He was promoted to major general of U.S. Volunteers on August 13, 1898. He was advanced to the Regular Army grade of major general after his retirement on January 21, 1900.

=== Philippine–American War ===
When the Spanish–American War ended, Anderson stayed in Manila where he was placed in command of the 1st Division, VIII Corps and saw action in the 1899 Battle of Manila during the Philippine–American War. After the U.S. forces broke the Filipino siege, Anderson led his division in minor engagements at Santana, San Pedro and Guadalupe. In March 1899, he was promoted to the rank of brigadier general in the Regular Army.

Anderson received an honorary LL.D. degree from Mount St. Mary's College in 1899. He was placed on the Army retired list January 20, 1900, having reached the mandatory retirement age of 64.

== Later life ==
After retirement from the Army, Anderson became commandant of the Ohio Soldiers Home. After serving in this post for three years, he moved to Portland, Oregon.

General Anderson was a member of the Grand Army of the Republic and a Veteran Companion of both the Military Order of the Loyal Legion of the United States and the Military Order of Foreign Wars. He was also a member of the Oregon Society of the Sons of the American Revolution.

Anderson died on May 8, 1917, in Portland. He is buried in Arlington National Cemetery.

== Family ==
He was married to Elizabeth Van Winkle of New Jersey on February 8, 1869, in Richmond, Virginia. They had two sons and four daughters. One of their sons, Thomas McArthur Anderson Jr., served in Texas as private, corporal, and sergeant in troop G, 4th U.S. cavalry, Aug. 28, 1894, to June 27, 1897, was promoted 2d lieutenant, 13th infantry, June 8, 1897, and commanded company B at Santiago, Cuba, July 1–4, 1898. He also served during World War I, retiring as a colonel in February 1935 having earned three Silver Stars during his military career.

He was a cousin of Brevet Major General Nicholas Longworth Anderson.
