= 93rd Ohio Infantry Regiment =

- Active: August 20, 1862, to June 8, 1865
- Country: United States
- Allegiance: Union
- Branch: Infantry
- Engagements: Battle of Stones River; Tullahoma Campaign; Battle of Chickamauga; Siege of Chattanooga; Battle of Missionary Ridge; Atlanta campaign; Battle of Resaca; Battle of Kennesaw Mountain; Battle of Peachtree Creek; Siege of Atlanta; Battle of Jonesboro; Second Battle of Franklin; Battle of Nashville

The 93rd Ohio Infantry Regiment, sometimes 93rd Ohio Volunteer Infantry (or 93rd OVI) was an infantry regiment in the Union Army during the American Civil War.

== Service ==
The 93rd Ohio Infantry was organized at Dayton, Ohio and mustered in for three years service on August 20, 1862, under the command of Colonel Charles Anderson.

The regiment was attached to Ward's Brigade, 12th Division, Army of the Ohio, September 1862. 4th Brigade, 2nd Division, I Corps, Army of the Ohio, to November 1862. 3rd Brigade, 2nd Division, Right Wing, XIV Corps, Army of the Cumberland, to January 1863. 3rd Brigade, 2nd Division, XX Corps, Army of the Cumberland, to October 1863. 2nd Brigade, 3rd Division, IV Corps, Army of the Cumberland, to June 1865.

The 93rd Ohio Infantry mustered out of service at Nashville, Tennessee, on June 8, 1865.

== Detailed service ==
Left Ohio for Lexington, Ky., August 23. March to relief of Nelson August 29-September 1. Retreat from Lexington to Louisville, Ky., September 1–4. Pursuit of Bragg into Kentucky October 1–15, 1862. Battle of Perryville, Ky., October 8 (reserve). March to Nashville, Tenn., October 16-November 7. Action at Kimbrough's Mills, Mill Creek and Lebanon (Antioch Church), December 6. Duty at Nashville until December 26, Advance on Murfreesboro December 26–30. Battle of Stones River December 30–31, 1862 and January 1–3, 1863. Duty at Murfreesboro until June. Tullahoma Campaign June 23-July 7. Liberty Gap June 24–27. Occupation of middle Tennessee until August 16. Passage of the Cumberland Mountains and Tennessee River and Chickamauga Campaign August 16-September 22. Battle of Chickamauga, September 19–20. Siege of Chattanooga, September 24-November 23. Reopening Tennessee River October 26–29. Brown's Ferry October 27. Chattanooga-Ringgold Campaign November 23–27. Orchard Knob November 23–24. Missionary Ridge November 25. March to relief of Knoxville November 28-December 8. Operations in eastern Tennessee until April 1864. Charleston, Tenn., December 28, 1863 (detachment). Operations about Dandridge January 16–17, 1864. Dandridge January 17. Atlanta Campaign May 1 to September 8, 1864. Demonstrations on Rocky Faced Ridge and Dalton, Ga., May 8–13. Buzzard's Roost Gap May 8–9. Battle of Resaca May 14–15. Adairsville May 17. Near Kingston May 18–19. Near Cassville May 19. Advance on Dallas May 22–25. Operations on line of Pumpkin Vine Creek and battles about Dallas, New Hope Church and Allatoona Hills May 25-June 5. Pickett's Mills May 27. Operations about Marietta and against Kennesaw Mountain June 10-July 2. Pine Hill June 11–14. Lost Mountain June 15–17. Assault on Kennesaw June 27. Ruff's Station, Smyrna Camp Ground, July 4. Chattahoochie River July 5–17. Pace's Ferry July 5. Peachtree Creek July 19–20. Siege of Atlanta July 22-August 25. Flank movement on Jonesboro August 25–30. Battle of Jonesboro August 31-September 1. Lovejoy's Station September 2–6. Operations against Hood in northern Georgia and northern Alabama September 29-November 3. Nashville Campaign November–December. Columbia, Duck River, November 24–27. Battle of Franklin November 30. Battle of Nashville December 15–16. Pursuit of Hood to the Tennessee River December 17–23. Moved to Huntsville, Ala., and duty there until March 1865. Operations in eastern Tennessee March 15-April 22. Moved to Nashville, Tenn., and duty there until June.

== Casualties ==
The regiment lost a total of 217 men during service; 4 officers and 106 enlisted men killed or mortally wounded, 107 enlisted men died of disease.

== Commanders ==
- Colonel Charles Anderson - badly wounded at the battle of Stones River; resigned
- Colonel Hiram Strong - commanded at the battle of Chickamauga
- Lieutenant Colonel William Henry Martin - commanded at the battle of Chickamauga
- Lieutenant Colonel Daniel Bowman - commanded at the battle of Nashville

== Notable members ==
- Colonel Charles Anderson - 27th governor of Ohio, 1865-1866

== See also ==
- List of Ohio Civil War units
- Ohio in the Civil War
