= 6th Ohio Infantry Regiment =

- Active: 1862–1864
- Country: United States
- Allegiance: Union
- Branch: Volunteer Army
- Type: Infantry
- Size: ~1,000 soldiers at outset of the war
- Engagements: Battle of Laurel Hill; Battle of Cheat Mountain; Battle of Shiloh; Battle of Perryville; Battle of Stones River; Battle of Chickamauga; Atlanta campaign

Commanders
- Notable commanders: Nicholas Longworth Anderson

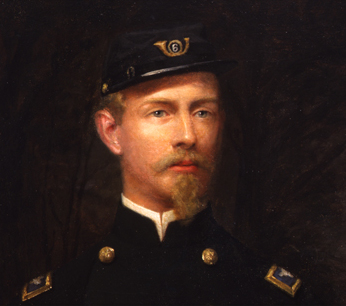
Nicholas Longworth Anderson

The 6th Ohio Infantry Regiment was a three-month regiment and later a three-year regiment (Note: During the state of emergency caused by Maj. Gen. Kirby Smith's advance on Cincinnati in August 1862, the stae of Ohio mobilized the 6th Regiment of Volunteer Militia alongside the 8th and 11th Volunteer Militia. These three demobilized after Smith withdrew in September.) in the Union Army during the American Civil War, primarily serving in the Western Theater in a series of campaigns and battles.

== Organization and service ==
The 6th Ohio Infantry Regiment was organized in southwestern Ohio in the spring of 1861, formed around a nucleus independent militia unit known as the Guthrie Greys. It was mustered into Federal service on May 12. Most of its recruits were from Hamilton County and surrounding areas. Colonel and first Commander was William K. Bosley and Nicholas Longworth Anderson of Cincinnati was its first lieutenant colonel. Anderson served as colonel of the regiment during its last two years of service. The 6th was first sent to western Virginia before mustering out when its initial three-months term of enlistment expired. Reorganized as a three-years regiment, the regiment spent the next three years in the Western Theater before being mustered out on June 23, 1864.

On March 13, 1865, Anderson was brevetted to the rank of major general and brigadier general, for "gallant conduct and meritorious services in the Battle of Stone's River, Dec. 31, 1862" and for "distinguished gallantry and meritorious conduct in the Battle of Chickamauga, Sept. 19 and 20, 1863".

The lineage and history of the 6th Ohio Infantry Regiment was carried on by the 147th Infantry Regiment during World War I as part of the 37th Division, and during World War II as a separate unit. The unit continued as the 1st Battalion, 147th Armor (Ohio Army National Guard) until that unit's reorganization in 2007.

== Affiliations, battle honors, detailed service, and casualties ==
=== Organizational affiliation ===
Attached to:

- 1st Brigade, Army of Occupation, West Virginia, to September 1861
- 1st Brigade, Reynolds' Command, West Virginia, to November 1861
- 10th Brigade, Army of the Ohio (AoO), to December 1861.
- 10th Brigade, 4th Division, AoO, to September 1862.
- 10th Brigade, 4th Division, II Corps, AoO, to November 1862.
- 3rd Brigade, 2nd Division, Left Wing, XIV Corps, Army of the Cumberland (AoC), to January 1863.
- 3rd Brigade, 2nd Division, XXI Corps, AoC, to October 1863.
- 3rd Brigade, 3rd Division, IV Corps, AoC, to June 1864.

=== List of battles ===
The official list of battles in which the regiment bore a part:

- Battle of Laurel Hill
- Battle of Cheat Mountain
- Battle of Shiloh
- Siege of Corinth
- Battle of Perryville
- Battle of Stones River
- Tullahoma Campaign
- Battle of Chickamauga
- Chattanooga campaign
- Battle of Missionary Ridge

=== Detailed service ===
==== 1861 ====
- Mustered in April 27, 1861
- Duty at Camp Harrison till May 17
- Moved to Camp Dennison, OH, May 17, and duty there till June 18
- Reorganized for three years' service June 18, 1861
- Three-months men mustered out July 24, 1861
- Moved to Fetterman, WV, June 29-July 2
- Move to Grafton, WV, July 2, 1861
- March to Philippi July 4
- West Virginia Campaign July 6–21
- Battle of Laurel Hill July 8
- Corrick's Ford July 13
- Pursuit of Garnett's forces July 15–16
- Duty at Beverly till August 6
- Camp at Elkwater, foot of Cheat Mountain, August 6-November 19
- Operations on Cheat Mountain against Lee September 11–17
- Cheat Mountain Pass September 12
- Reconnaissance up Tygart Valley September 26–29
- Moved to Louisville, KY November 19–30.
- Duty at Camp Buell till December 9, and at Camp Wickliffe, KY, till February 14, 1862.

==== 1862 ====
- Expedition down Ohio River to reinforce Grant at Fort Donelson, thence to Nashville, TN, February 14–25
- Occupation of Nashville February 25, the first regiment to enter city
- Camp on Murfreesboro Pike till March 17
- March to Savannah, TN, March 17-April 6
- Battle of Shiloh, April 6–7
- Duty at Pittsburg Landing, TN till May 24
- Siege of Corinth, May 24–30
- Occupation of Corinth, MS May 30
- Pursuit to Booneville, MS May 30-July 12
- Moved to Athens, AL, and duty there till July 17
- Ordered to Murfreesboro, TN July 17, thence to McMinnville, TN and duty there till August 17
- March to Louisville, KY, in pursuit of Bragg August 17-September 26
- Pursuit of Bragg into Kentucky October 1–22
- Battle of Perryville October 8
- March to Nashville, October 22-November 7, and duty there till December 26
- Advance on Murfreesboro, December 26–30
- Battle of Stones River December 30, 1862 - January 3, 1863

==== 1863 ====
- Duty at and near Murfreesboro till June
- Actions at Woodbury, TN, January 24 and April 4
- Middle Tennessee or Tullahoma Campaign June 23-July 7
- At Manchester till August 16
- Passage of Cumberland Mountains and Tennessee River, and Chickamauga Campaign August 16-September 22
- Battle of Chickamauga September 19–20
- Siege of Chattanooga, TN, September 24-November 23
- Reopening Tennessee River October 26–29
- Battle of Brown's Ferry October 27
- Chattanooga-Ringgold Campaign November 23–27
- Orchard Knob November 23–24
- Battle of Missionary Ridge November 25
- March to relief of Knoxville, TN, November 28-December 8

==== 1864 ====
- Operations in East Tennessee till April, 1864
- About Dandridge, TN January 16–17
- Garrison at Cleveland, TN, April 12-May 17, and at Resaca, GA, guarding railroad bridge over the Oostanaula River, till June 6
- Ordered to the rear for muster out June 6
- Mustered out at Camp Dennison, OH, June 23, 1864, expiration of term.

=== Casualties ===
The regiment lost a total of 144 men during service; 4 officers and 82 enlisted men killed or mortally wounded, 2 officers and 56 enlisted men died of disease.

== Armament ==
From the outset, the three-month incarnation of the 6th Ohio, coming from various militia companies, was armed with Model 1842 Muskets and percussion converted Model 1822 Muskets with an indeterminate number rifled after initial manufacture by Miles Greenwood in Cincinnati. In January 1862, the regiment improved its armament by exchanging older, mixed-caliber weapons for more reliable imported .58 caliber "Belgian" or Saxon Model 1851 rifle-muskets, (Note: The Model 1851 Saxon Rifle Musket, one of many imported European arms differed from the M1857 only in a longer barrel length. Both were rated as first class arms and bought in 1861 from the armory at Dresden, the capital of the Kingdom of Saxony. Due to their manufacture in Liege for the Saxon government, contemporary Civil War period references to them as “Belgian rifles.” The 6th Ohio obtained their Belgian arms by swapping their .69 caliber smoothbore and conversion muskets to the 15th and 50th Indiana.) and Pattern 1853 Enfield rifle-muskets ensuring consistent ammunition. The flank companies, A and B, received 200 Enfields. During the re-equipping in preparation for the Tullahoma campaign, the line companies turned in their Model 1851s received Springfield Model 1861s.

Survey for Fourth Quarter, 31 December 1862

- A — Number unreported, British Pattern 1853 rifles, (.58 and .577 Cal)
- B — Number unreported, British Pattern 1853 rifles, (.58 and .577 Cal)
- C — 23 British Pattern 1853 rifles, (.58 and .577 Cal)
- D — 56 British Pattern 1853 rifles, (.58 and .577 Cal)
- E — 4 Model 1861 Springfield rifles, (.58 Cal.); 39 Belgian Saxon Model 1851 rifles, (.58 Cal.); 19 British Pattern 1853 rifles, (.58 and .577 Cal)
- F — Number unreported, Belgian Saxon Model 1851 rifles, (.58 Cal.)
- G — 59 British Pattern 1853 rifles, (.58 and .577 Cal)
- H — 46 Belgian Saxon Model 1851 rifles, (.58 Cal.)
- I — 7 Model 1861 Springfield rifles, (.58 Cal.); 14 Belgian Saxon Model 1851 rifles, (.58 Cal.); 17 British Pattern 1853 rifles, (.58 and .577 Cal)
- K — 8 Model 1861 Springfield rifles, (.58 Cal.); 39 Belgian Saxon Model 1851 rifles, (.58 Cal.)
- Command stores — 1 Model 1861 Springfield rifles, (.58 Cal.); 65 Belgian Saxon Model 1851 rifles, (.58 Cal.); 14 British Pattern 1853 rifles, (.58 and .577 Cal)

Survey for Fourth Quarter, 31 December 1863

- A — 4 Model 1861 Springfield rifles, (.58 Cal.); 15 Belgian Saxon Model 1851 rifles, (.58 Cal.); 19 British Pattern 1853 rifles, (.58 and .577 Cal)
- B — 29 Belgian Saxon Model 1851 rifles, (.58 Cal.); 29 British Pattern 1853 rifles, (.58 and .577 Cal)
- C — 11 Model 1861 Springfield rifles, (.58 Cal.); 18 Belgian Saxon Model 1851 rifles, (.58 Cal.); 21 British Pattern 1853 rifles, (.58 and .577 Cal)
- D — 15 Model 1861 Springfield rifles, (.58 Cal.); 18 Belgian Saxon Model 1851 rifles, (.58 Cal.); 33 British Pattern 1853 rifles, (.58 and .577 Cal)
- E — 8 Model 1861 Springfield rifles, (.58 Cal.); 21 Belgian Saxon Model 1851 rifles, (.58 Cal.); 29 British Pattern 1853 rifles, (.58 and .577 Cal)
- F — 10 Model 1861 Springfield rifles, (.58 Cal.); 23 Belgian Saxon Model 1851 rifles, (.58 Cal.); 33 British Pattern 1853 rifles, (.58 and .577 Cal)
- G — 4 Model 1861 Springfield rifles, (.58 Cal.); 43 Belgian Saxon Model 1851 rifles, (.58 Cal.); 48 British Pattern 1853 rifles, (.58 and .577 Cal)
- H — 5 Model 1861 Springfield rifles, (.58 Cal.); 5 Belgian Saxon Model 1851 rifles, (.58 Cal.); 19 British Pattern 1853 rifles, (.58 and .577 Cal)
- I — 6 Model 1861 Springfield rifles, (.58 Cal.); 15 Belgian Saxon Model 1851 rifles, (.58 Cal.); 33 British Pattern 1853 rifles, (.58 and .577 Cal)
- K — 17 Model 1861 Springfield rifles, (.58 Cal.); 185 Belgian Saxon Model 1851 rifles, (.58 Cal.); 29 British Pattern 1853 rifles, (.58 and .577 Cal)
- Command stores — 13 Model 1861 Springfield rifles, (.58 Cal.); 4 Belgian Saxon Model 1851 rifles, (.58 Cal.); 4 British Pattern 1853 rifles, (.58 and .577 Cal)

=== Muskets/Rifle-muskets ===
Issued Weapons
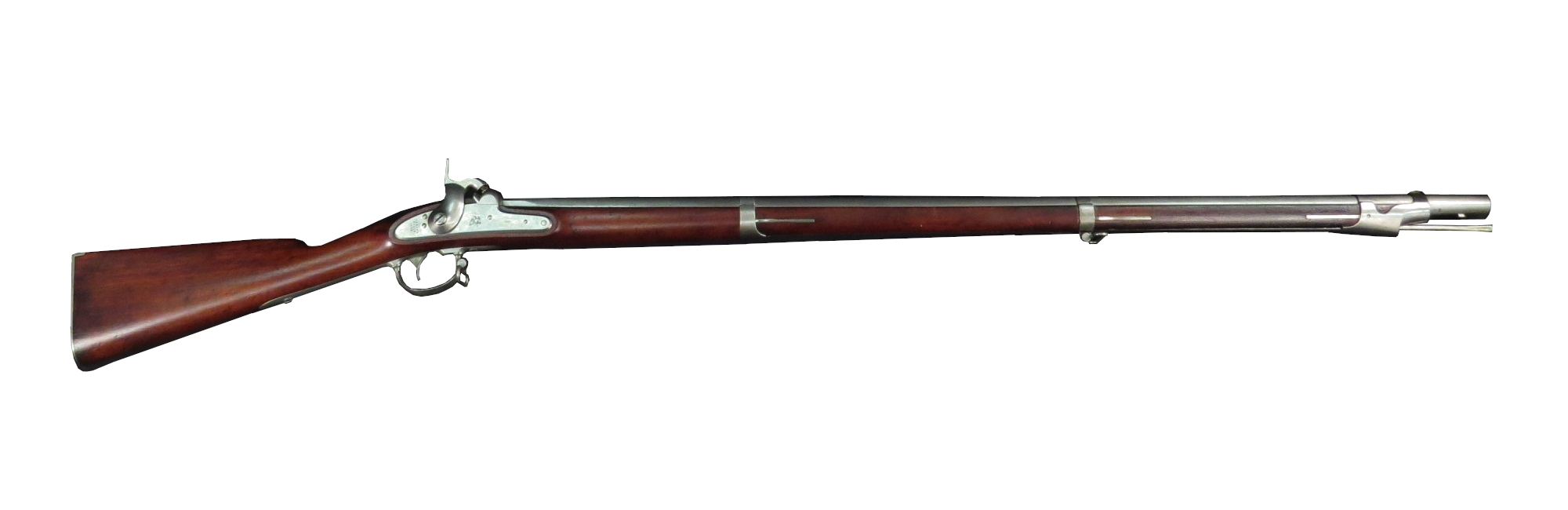
Model 1842 smoothbore musket

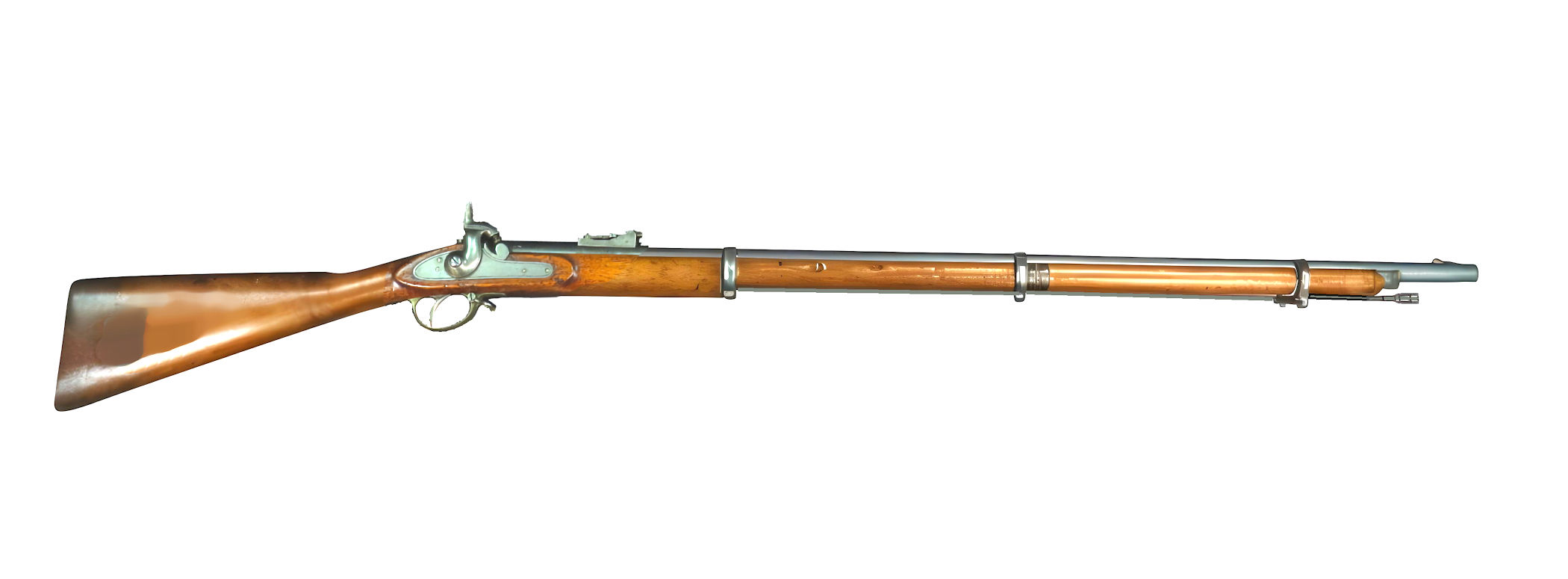
Liege-manufactured Saxon Model 1851 rifle-musket

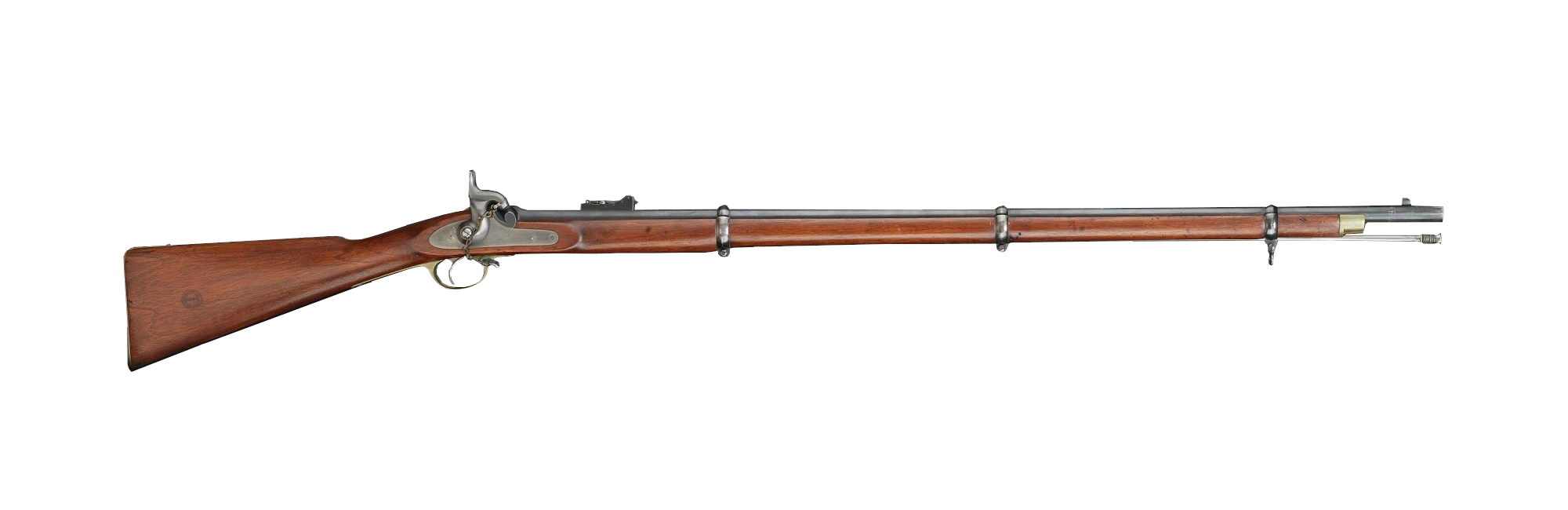
Pattern 1853 Enfield rifle-musket

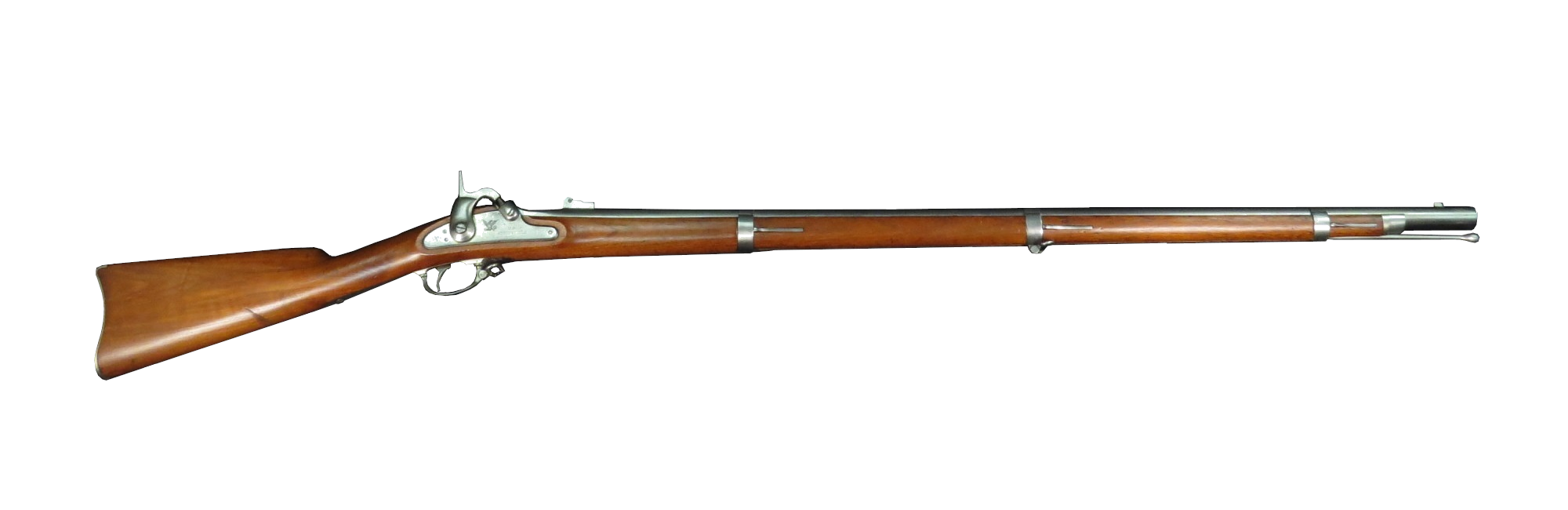
Springfield Model 1861
