= Industry barque disaster =

Industry was a barque that grounded trying to enter the Columbia River in 1865. Numerous people died.

The ship was built in 1862. The vessel departed from San Francisco February 23, 1865, hit storms, and later ran aground after waiting for a pilot to escort it into mouth of the Columbia River on March 15. Seventeen people died and seven survived. A survivor carved the number of dead and survivors on Shark Rock. The lighthouse keeper at Cape Disappointment had no boat suitable to rescue survivors.

Rescuers from Fort Cape Disappointment tried to reach survivors.

== See also ==
- USS Shark (1821)
