= William Vance McMaken =

United States Army general

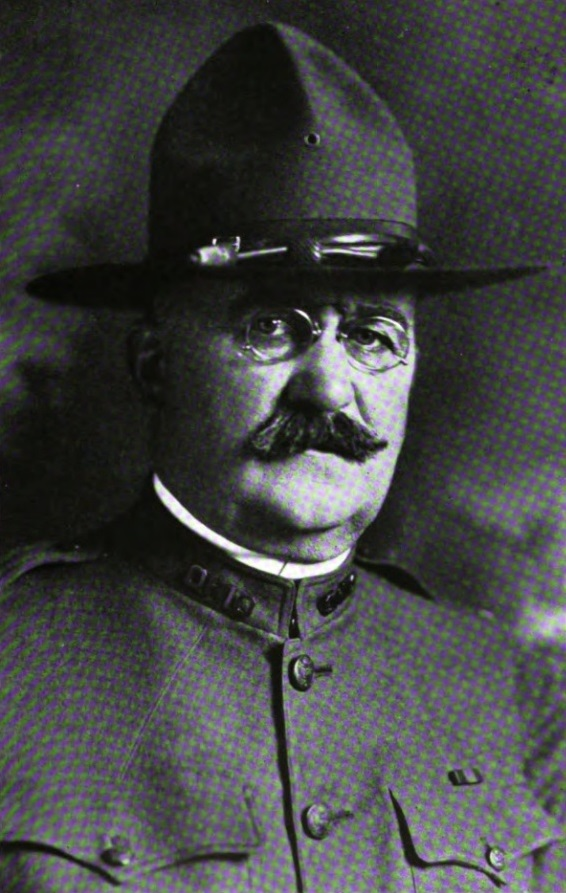
- From 1926's The Thirty-Seventh Division in the World War, 1917-1918
- Born: February 11, 1857; New York City New York
- Died: January 13, 1923 (aged 65); Toledo, Ohio
- Burial place: Woodlawn Cemetery
- Military career
- Allegiance: United States
- Branch: United States Army
- Service years: 1880–1918
- Rank: Major General
- Units: Ohio National Guard, 6th Ohio Infantry
- Commands: Ohio National Guard, 74th Infantry Brigade, 16th Ohio Infantry
- Conflicts: Spanish–American War, World War I

Major General William Vance McMaken (February 11, 1857 – January 13, 1923) was a U.S. Army general.

== Early life ==
William Vance McMaken was born February 11, 1857, in New York City, New York; his father was a native of Hamilton, Ohio, and his mother was from West Winsted, Connecticut. His paternal grandfather was a veteran of the War of 1812 and his maternal ancestors served in the Continental Army during the American Revolution. When he was about seven, his family moved to Toledo, Ohio, where his father had been appointment postmaster by President Grant.

== Military career ==
McMaken entered the Ohio National Guard and was the captain of an infantry company for nineteen years, then became colonel of the 16th Ohio Infantry, which during the Spanish–American War was the Sixth Ohio Infantry. In 1899 he spent four months in Cuba and on December 5, 1899, he was promoted to a National Guard brigadier general and commanded the Ohio National Guard during a number of civil disturbances. On August 5, 1917, he was promoted to brigadier general (NA), and his 6th Ohio Infantry became the 147th Infantry Regiment. He commanded the 74th Infantry Brigade, part of the 37th Ohio Infantry Division, and served in Toledo, Ohio, and Montgomery, Alabama. After physical exams in December 1917 and January 1918, he was discharged due to physical disability on March 20, 1918.

== Personal life ==
On October 31, 1883, he married a former high school classmate, Georgie Dorr, daughter of the former mayor of Toledo; they had two daughters, Myra Dorr McMaken and Carrie Dorr McMaken.

After being discharged, he lived in Toledo and worked as an internal revenue collector and custodian of the Toledo Federal Building. His home was at 2215 Scottswood Avenue. McMaken died of heart disease on January 13, 1923. He was buried at Woodlawn Cemetery in Toledo.
