= Robert Anderson (Union officer) =

American Civil War Union Army officer (1805–1871)

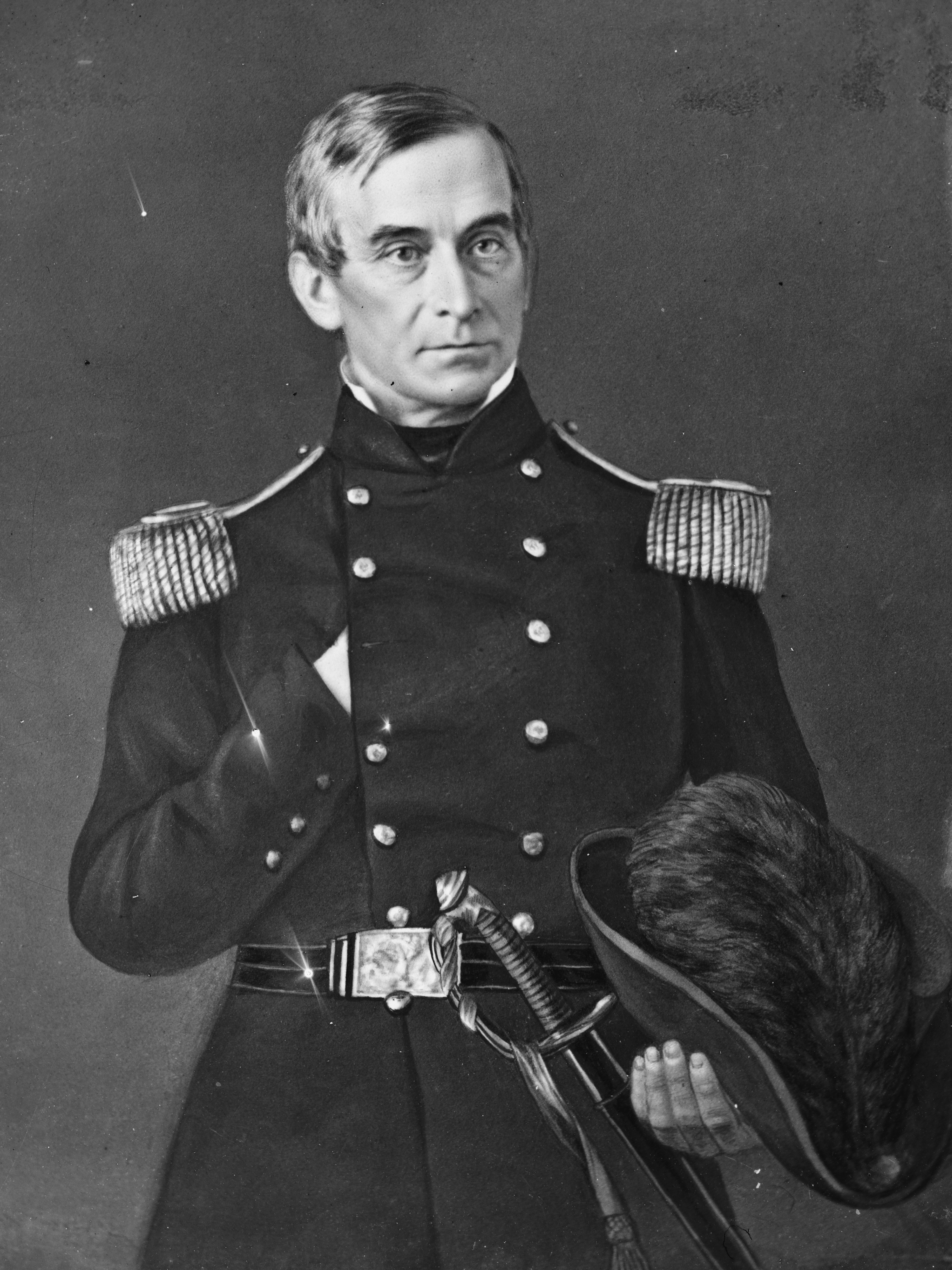
- Anderson, c. 1861
- Born: June 14, 1805; Louisville, Kentucky, U.S.
- Died: October 27, 1871 (aged 66); Nice, France
- Burial place: West Point Cemetery
- Education: United States Military Academy
- Military career
- Branch: United States Army
- Service years: 1821–1863
- Rank: Brigadier general Brevet major general
- Units: 3rd Regiment of Artillery; 1st Regiment of Artillery
- Commands: Fort Sumter; Army of the Cumberland; Fort Adams
- Conflicts: Black Hawk War; Battle of Bad Axe; Second Seminole War; Battles of the Loxahatchee; Mexican–American War; Siege of Veracruz; Battle of Cerro Gordo; Battle of Molino del Rey (WIA); American Civil War; Battle of Fort Sumter (surrendered)

Robert Anderson (June 14, 1805 – October 26, 1871) was a United States Army officer during the American Civil War. He was the Union commander in the first battle of the American Civil War at Fort Sumter in April 1861 when the Confederates bombarded the fort and forced its surrender, starting the war. Anderson was celebrated as a hero in the North and promoted to brigadier general and given command of Union forces in Kentucky. He was removed late in 1861 and reassigned to Rhode Island, before retiring from military service in 1863. In 1865, he returned to Fort Sumter to again raise the American flag that he had lowered during the 1861 surrender.

== Early life and career ==
Anderson was born at "Soldier's Retreat," the Anderson family estate near Louisville, Kentucky. His father, Richard Clough Anderson Sr. (1750–1826) was of Scots-Irish ancestry from Antrim, Northern Ireland. He served in the Continental Army as an aide-de-camp to the Marquis de Lafayette during the American Revolutionary War. He was a charter member of the Society of the Cincinnati. Anderson's mother, Sarah Marshall (1779–1854), was a cousin of John Marshall, the fourth Chief Justice of the United States.

Anderson graduated from the United States Military Academy (West Point) in 1825, and received a commission as a second lieutenant in the 3rd Regiment of Artillery.

A few months after graduation, he became a private secretary to his older brother Richard Clough Anderson, Jr., who was serving as the US Minister to Gran Colombia. He served in the Black Hawk War of 1832 as a colonel of Illinois volunteers, where he had the distinction of twice mustering Abraham Lincoln in and once out of army service. He also was in charge of transporting Black Hawk to Jefferson Barracks after his capture, assisted by Jefferson Davis.

Returning to regular Army service as a first lieutenant in 1833, he served in the Second Seminole War as an assistant adjutant general on the staff of Winfield Scott, and was promoted to captain in October 1841.

Anderson was the author of Instruction for Field Artillery, Horse and Foot, published in 1839.

In the Mexican–American War in 1847, he participated in the Siege of Veracruz (March 9–29), the Battle of Cerro Gordo (April 17–18), the Skirmish of Amazoque, (May 14), and the Battle of Molino del Rey (September 8), during which he was severely wounded while assaulting enemy fortifications, for which he received a brevet promotion to major.

Due to his wounds, Anderson was on sick leave during 1847–48. He was then in garrison at Fort Preble, Maine, from 1848 to 1849. He served from 1849 to 1851 as a member of the Board of Officers to devise "A Complete System of Instruction for Siege, Garrison, Seacoast, and Mountain Artillery," which was adopted on May 10, 1851. He then returned to garrison duty at Fort Preble from 1850 to 1853.

From 1855 to 1859, in view of his precarious health and probably also due to his connections to General Winfield Scott, Anderson was assigned to the light duty of inspecting the iron beams produced in a mill in Trenton, New Jersey for Federal construction projects. He eventually received a permanent promotion to major of the 1st Regiment of Artillery in the Regular Army on October 5, 1857.

While residing in Trenton, Anderson became a Freemason, and was a member of Mercer Lodge No. 50

== Civil War ==
=== Fort Sumter ===
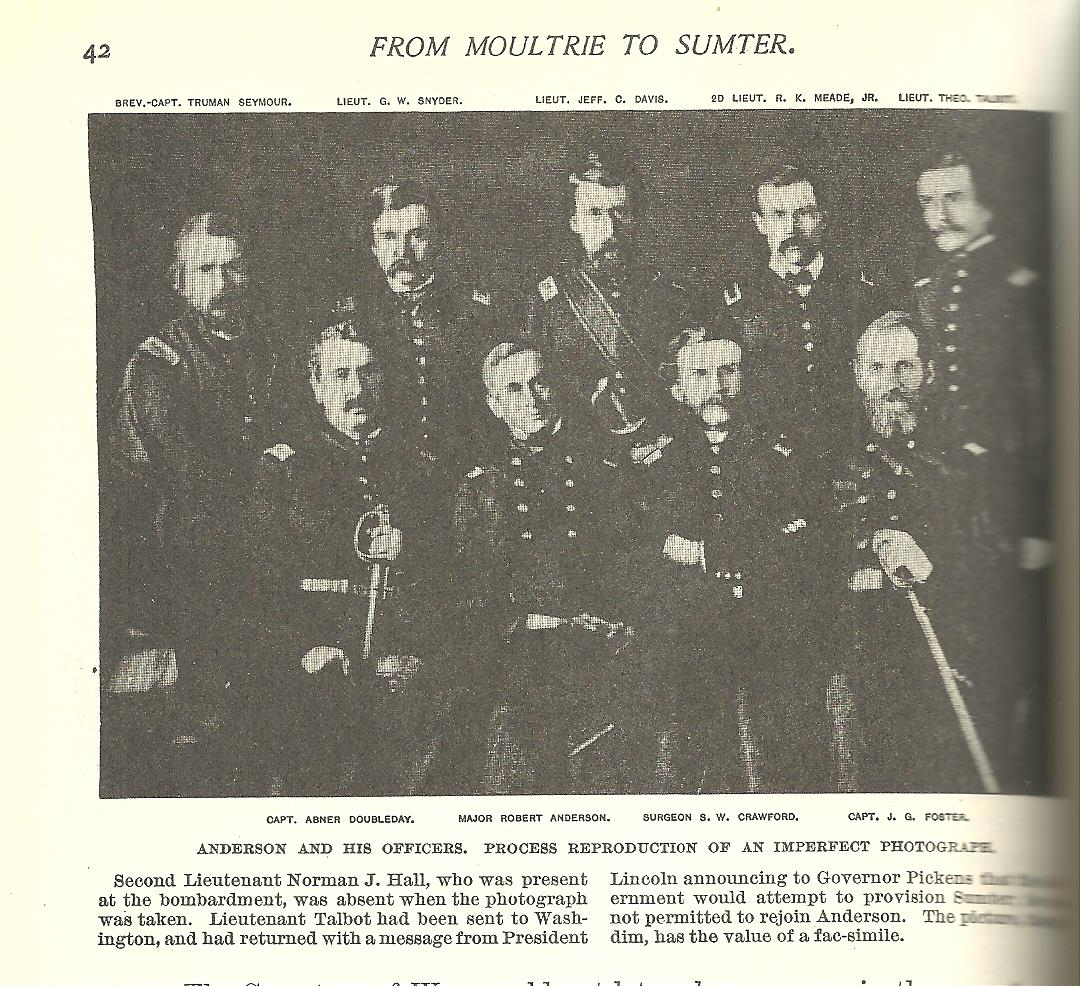
Major Robert Anderson and his officers Ft Sumpter South Carolina

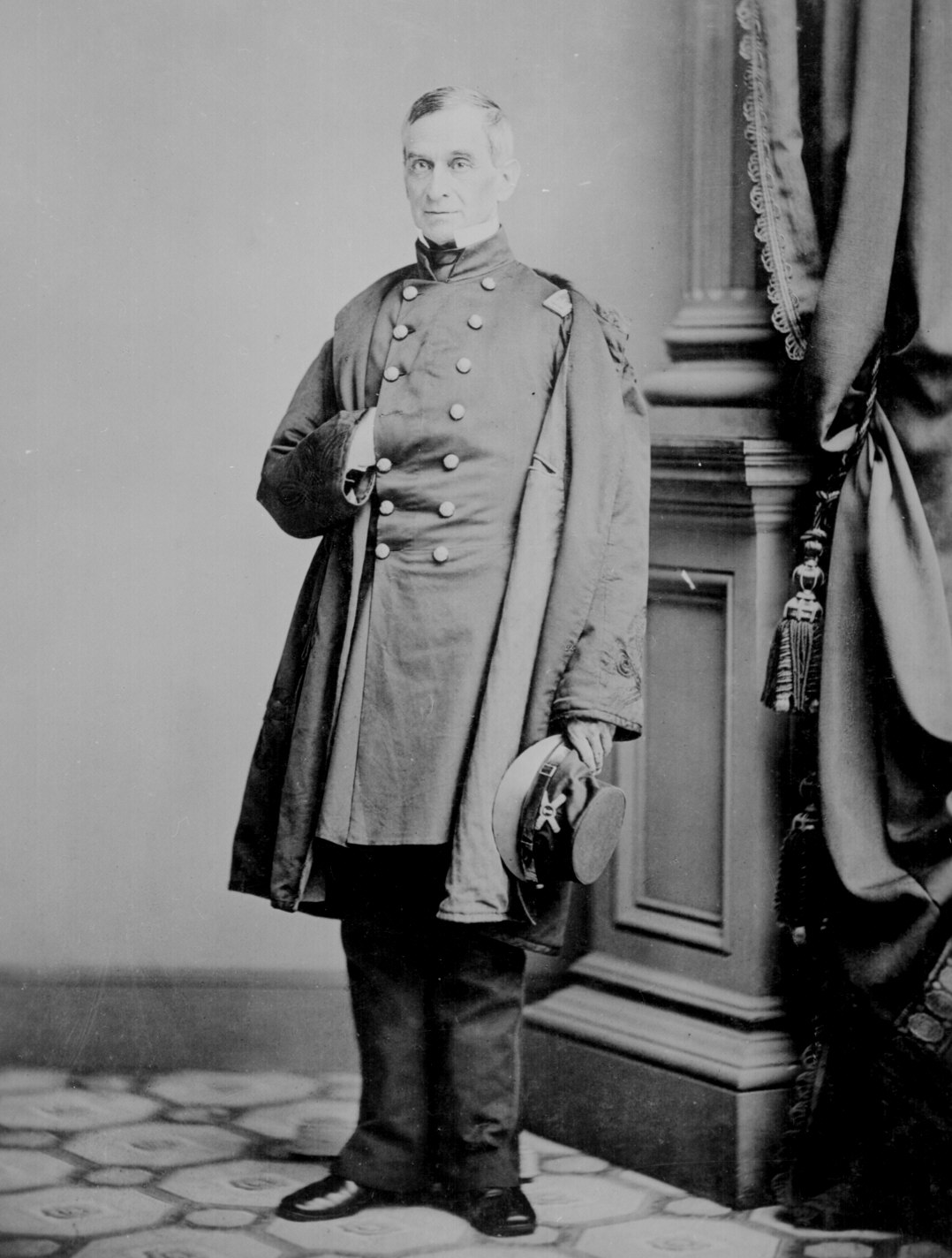
Major Robert Anderson, photo by Mathew Brady

In November 1860, Anderson was assigned to command of U.S. forces in and around Charleston, South Carolina, replacing Colonel John L. Gardner. With South Carolina headed for secession in December 1860, Gardner, feeling that the small garrison at Fort Moultrie was under-armed, had attempted to draw arms and ammunition from the Federal arsenal in the city, but was prevented from doing so by a crowd of civilians. His attempt sparked local protests, and Secretary of the Army John B. Floyd decided that Gardner, a Massachusetts native, should be replaced by a Southerner. Anderson, a former slave owner from Kentucky and generally sympathetic to the South, was selected.

Anderson moved the garrison from Fort Moultrie, which was indefensible, to the more modern and more defensible Fort Sumter, in the middle of Charleston Harbor, an action which caused great consternation in South Carolina, which responded by taking Fort Moultrie and the other Federal assets in the harbor and the city. In the immediate aftermath of Anderson's move, President James Buchanan and War Secretary Floyd claimed that Anderson had gone against orders, until an examination of War Department files showed that he had acted within the discretion he had been given.

In February 1861, the Confederate States of America was formed and took command of the campaign against Fort Sumter in South Carolina. Confederate President Jefferson Davis ordered that the fort should be taken. The artillery attack was commanded by Brigadier General P. G. T. Beauregard, who had been Anderson's student at West Point. The attack began on April 12, 1861, and continued until Anderson, badly outnumbered and outgunned, surrendered the fort on April 13. The battle began the American Civil War. No one was killed in the battle on either side, but one Union soldier was killed, and another was mortally wounded during a 50-gun salute to the flag just before the fort was surrendered.

=== Status as national hero ===
Anderson's actions in defense of Fort Sumter made him an immediate national hero. He was promoted to brigadier general in the Regular Army, effective May 15. Anderson took the fort's 33-star flag with him to New York City, where he participated in a Union Square patriotic rally that was, at the time, the largest public gathering in North America.

=== Symbolism of the American flag ===
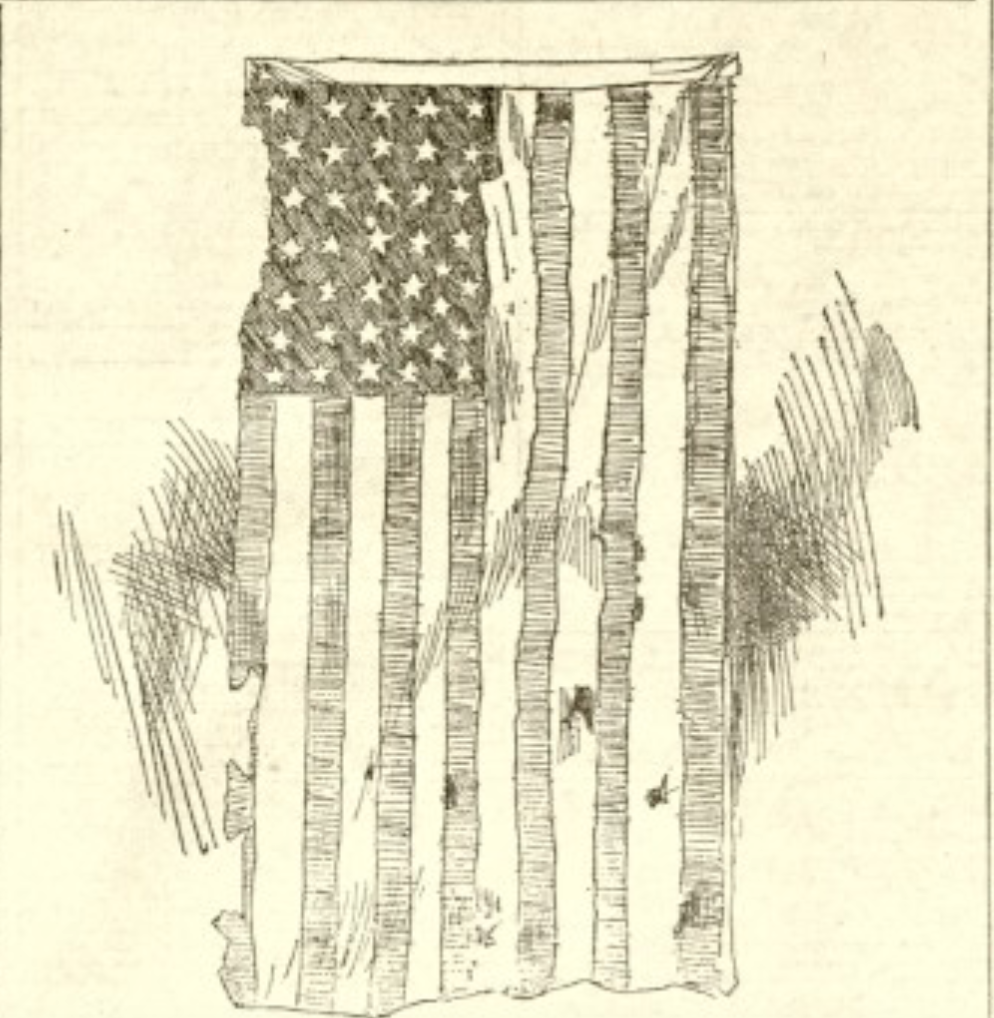
Anderson's personal flag, which was later captured by rebel forces

The modern meaning of the American flag, according to Harold Holzer in 2007 and Adam Goodheart in 2011, was forged by Anderson's stand at Fort Sumter. Holzer states that New York City:

responded with a "feast of the American flag." Eyewitnesses estimated that as many as 100,000 flags were quickly displayed across the city. To punctuate this feast of national colors, New York's graphic artists rushed out patriotic engravings and lithographs depicting avenging soldiers or gowned goddesses, bayonets upthrust, carrying "The Flag of Our Union" into future battles that, at the time, could only be imagined. Composers dedicated songs like "Our Country's Flag" to President Lincoln, and adorned their published sheet music with colorful images of resolute soldiers gripping the national banner.

During the war, the flag was used throughout the North to symbolize American nationalism and to reject secessionism. Goodheart explained that the flag was transformed into a sacred symbol of patriotism:

Before that day, the flag had served mostly as a military ensign or a convenient marking of American territory, and displayed on special occasions like the Fourth of July. But in the weeks after Major Anderson's surprising stand, it became something different. Suddenly the Stars and Stripes flew... from houses, from storefronts, from churches; above the village greens and college quads. ... [T]hat old flag meant something new. The abstraction of the Union cause was transfigured into a physical thing: strips of cloth that millions of people would fight for, and many thousands would die for.

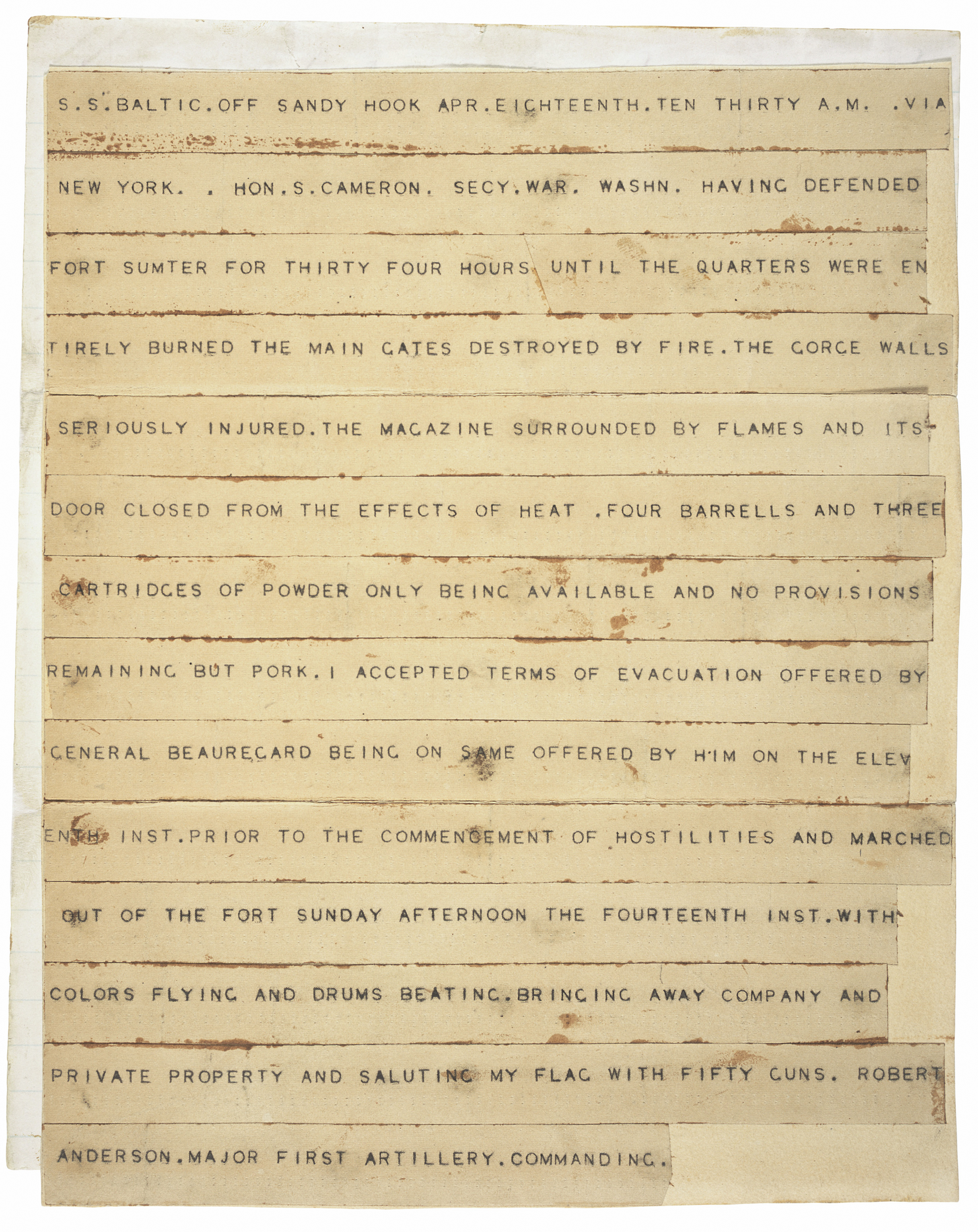
Robert Anderson's telegram announcing the surrender of Fort Sumter

=== Assignments ===
Anderson then went on a highly successful recruiting tour of the North and was promoted to brigadier general as of May 15, 1861. His next assignment placed him in another sensitive political position as commander of the Department of Kentucky (subsequently renamed the Department of the Cumberland), in a border state that had officially declared neutrality between the warring parties. He began serving in that position on May 28, 1861. Historians commonly attribute failing health as the reason for his relinquishing command to Brigadier General William T. Sherman on October 7, 1861. Still, a letter from Joshua Fry Speed, Lincoln's close friend, suggests that Lincoln preferred Anderson's removal.

Speed met with Anderson and found him reluctant to implement Lincoln's wishes to distribute rifles to Unionists in Kentucky. Anderson, Speed wrote to Lincoln on October 8, "seemed grieved that [he] had to surrender his command... [but] agreed that it was necessary and gracefully yielded."

In 1862, Anderson was elected an honorary member of the New York Society of the Cincinnati in which his grandnephew, Ambassador Larz Anderson, was highly active.

Anderson's last military assignment was a brief period as commanding officer of Fort Adams in Newport, Rhode Island, in August 1863. Anderson officially retired from the Army on October 27, 1863, "for Disability resulting from Long and Faithful Service, and Wounds and disease contracted in the Line of Duty." Still, he continued to serve on the staff of the general commanding the Eastern Department, headquartered in New York City, from October 27, 1863, to January 22, 1869. On February 3, 1865, Anderson was brevetted a major general for "gallantry and meritorious service" in the defense of Fort Sumter.

== Later life ==
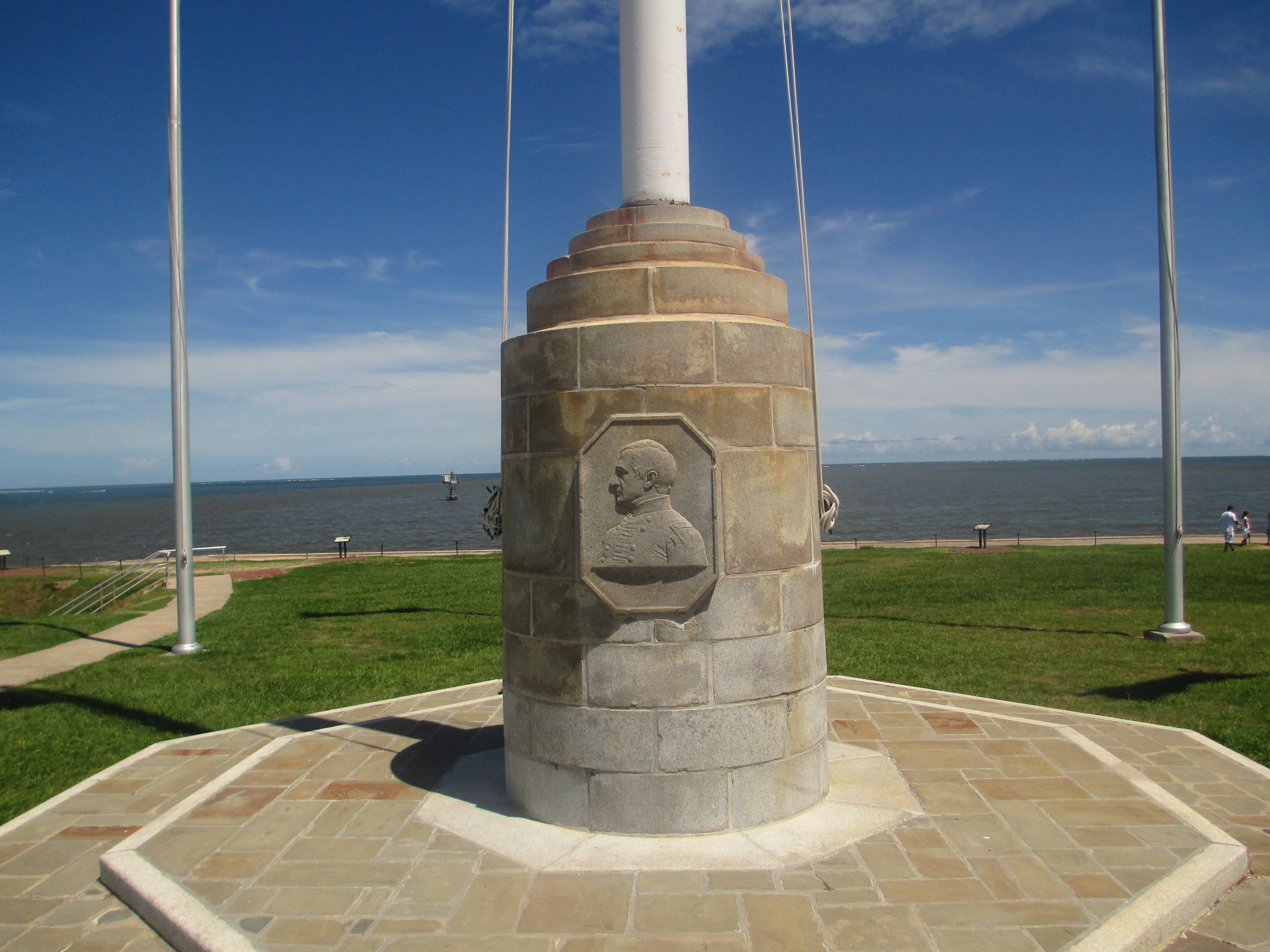
Major Robert Anderson is honored with his likeness inscribed in a monument atop Fort Sumter in Charleston harbor.

After Robert E. Lee's surrender at Appomattox and the effective conclusion of the war, at the behest of Secretary of War Edwin Stanton, Anderson returned to Charleston in uniform. Four years after lowering the 33-star flag in surrender, Anderson raised it in triumph over the recaptured but badly battered Fort Sumter. Hours after the ceremony of April 14, 1865, John Wilkes Booth assassinated President Lincoln.

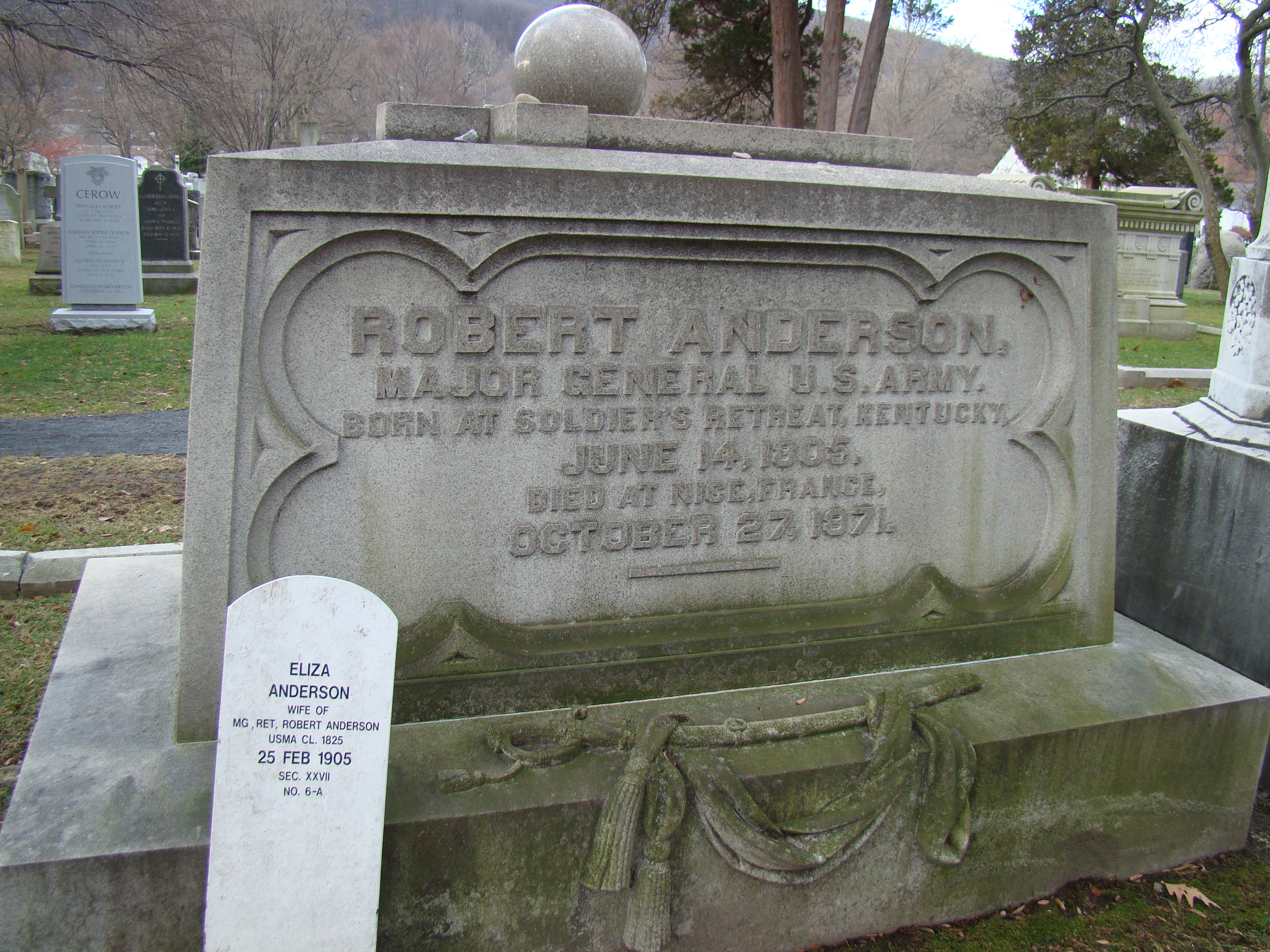
Gravesite at the West Point Cemetery

After the war, Anderson became a companion of the Military Order of the Loyal Legion of the United States. In 1869, he discussed the future of the U.S. Army with Sylvanus Thayer. Afterward, they helped establish the Military Academy's Association of Graduates (AoG).

In 1869, Anderson was reported to have sold his library and moved to Europe, "as half pay would not support his family here". Someone questioning his need informed us that Anderson's half salary as brigadier general was $4,125 (equivalent to $110,859 in 2025).

Anderson died in Nice, France, in 1871, seeking a cure for his ailments. He was interred at West Point Cemetery.

== Family ==
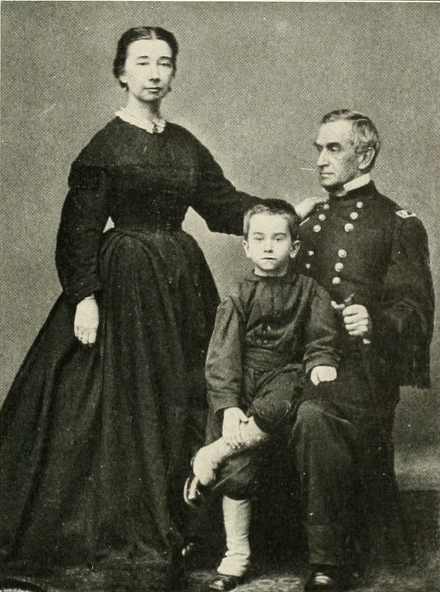
Anderson with his wife, Eliza Bayard Anderson, and son, Robert Jr.

Anderson's brother, Charles Anderson, served as Governor of Ohio from 1865 to 1866. A second brother, Larz Anderson II, was the father of Nicholas Longworth Anderson, who served as a Union Army general. Nicholas' son, Larz Anderson III, was a diplomat and a leading member of the Society of the Cincinnati.

Another brother, William Marshall Anderson, was a Western explorer and Ohio attorney. A zealous Catholic and Confederate sympathizer, he briefly moved to Mexico during the reign of Emperor Maximilian in hopes of establishing a Confederate colony there. W. Marshall Anderson's son, Thomas M. Anderson, was a brigadier general who fought in the Spanish–American War and Philippine–American War.

In 1845, Anderson married Eliza Bayard Clinch (1828–1905), the daughter of Duncan Lamont Clinch. They were the parents of five children: Marie (1849–1925), Sophie (1852–1934), Eliza, Robert Jr. (1859–1879), and Duncan. Anderson was the great-grandfather of actor Montgomery Clift through his daughter Maria, although genealogical sources have not definitively established this relationship. Allegedly, the doctor who delivered Ethel Anderson Clift told her when she was an adult that she was the illegitimate daughter of Maria Anderson and Woodbury Blair. Still, no documentation exists to verify the relationship. Nonetheless, the legend continues. Virtually all sources that advance this theory reference Ethel's own statements or Clift's biographies.

== Dates of rank ==
=== United States Army ===
Date	Insignia	Rank	Brevet promotions
July 1, 1821		Cadet	
July 1, 1825		Brevet second lieutenant Second lieutenant	
June 30, 1833		First lieutenant	Bvt. Captain (1838) (Note: April 2, 1838, for gallant and successful conduct during the Second Seminole War.)
October 23, 1841		Captain	Bvt. Major (1847) (Note: September 8, 1847, for gallantry and meritorious conduct in the Battle of Molino del Rey.)
October 5, 1857		Major	
May 15, 1861		Brigadier general	
October 27, 1863	Placed on the retired list with the rank of brigadier general (died October 26, 1871).		Bvt. Major general (1865) (Note: February 3, 1865, for gallant and meritorious service in the defense of Fort Sumter.)

== See also ==
- List of American Civil War generals (Union)
- List of people from the Louisville metropolitan area
