= Guthrie Greys =

The Guthrie Grays was an independent Ohio Militia company formed before the American Civil War.

The Guthrie Grays were organized in Cincinnati, Ohio in April 1854 as an "independent company", that is, a private military unit outside regular state control. Its first captain, Presley Guthrie, was a veteran of the Mexican–American War and the company came to attract many of "the most promising young men" of Cincinnati. Its first public appearance was in Cincinnati's Independence Day parade on July 4, 1854.

The company was reorganized, expanded, and redesignated the Guthrie Grays Battalion on January 10, 1859. The same year the Ohio legislature enacted a law recognizing the so-called "independent companies" such as the Guthrie Greys. They, thereafter, received access to state arms and munitions and would be subject to mobilization by the Governor of Ohio, but were otherwise permitted to select their own members, elect their own officers, drill at their own leisure, and choose their own uniforms.

The Guthrie Grays were amalgamated into the 6th Ohio Volunteer Infantry when it was formed in April 1861, becoming companies A and B of the regiment. The entire regiment carried the moniker "Guthrie Grays" during service in the U.S. Civil War.
