= USS Von Steuben =

USS Von Steuben has been the name of two ships in the United States Navy.

- USS Von Steuben (ID-3017), originally SS Kronprinz Wilhelm, a twin-screw, steam passenger ship built and operated by Germany, which was later commandeered by the United States government and renamed as USS Von Steuben during World War I, and sailed from 1901 to 1923
- USS Von Steuben (SSBN-632), a James Madison-class fleet ballistic missile submarine in service from 1964 to 1994.
