= Richard Clough Anderson Sr. =

American lawyer, politician, and surveyor (1750–1826)

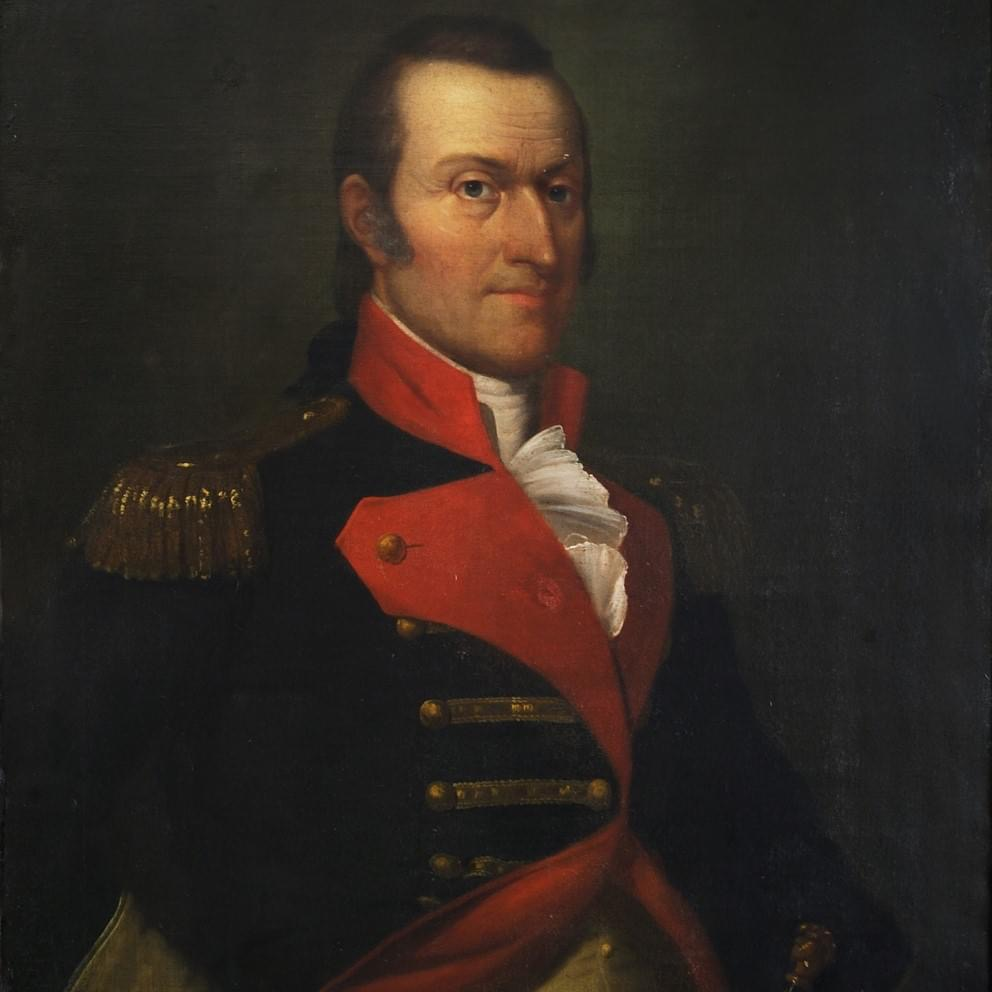
- 1805 portrait
- Born: January 12, 1750; Hanover County, Virginia
- Died: October 16, 1826 (aged 76); Hurstbourne, Kentucky
- Spouse(s): Elizabeth Clark; Sarah Marshall
- Children: 14, including Richard Jr., Charles, William, Robert
- Relatives: Larz Anderson (great grandson)
- Military career
- Allegiance: United States
- Branch: Continental Army
- Rank: Lt. Colonel
- Conflicts: American Revolutionary War

Richard Clough Anderson Sr. (January 12, 1750 – October 16, 1826) was an American lawyer, soldier, politician, and surveyor from Virginia.

== Revolutionary War ==
He was chosen to be a captain in the Hanover County, 5th Virginia Regiment on January 29, 1776.

After the Siege of Savannah, was on board the Wasp when Casimir Pulaski was taken north to be treated for the mortal wound he received. He attended Pulaski in his last hours and received from him his sword as an evidence of friendship.

Anderson fought in the battles of Brandywine and Germantown. He crossed the Delaware River with George Washington. He was aide-de-camp to Lafayette at the Battle of Yorktown.

At the end of the war, Anderson was promoted to lieutenant colonel.

== Later years ==
In 1788 he was a member of the state convention, and in 1793 a presidential elector. He was the principal surveyor of the Virginia Military District from 1783 until 1819. Anderson Township is named after him, as is Clough Creek. His first wife was Elizabeth Clark, sister of George Rogers Clark and William Clark. His second wife was Sarah Marshall (1779–1854), a cousin of John Marshall, the fourth Chief Justice of the United States. He is the father of Richard Clough Anderson Jr., Charles Anderson (27th governor of Ohio), William Marshall Anderson, and Robert Anderson (who surrendered to Confederate forces at Fort Sumter). He is the great grandfather of Larz Anderson, an American diplomat involved in foreign affairs, who had the Larz Anderson House built for him and his wife Isabel Weld Perkins, which was bequeathed to the Society of Cincinnati as their international headquarters. He is the father-in-law of Allen Latham who helped him with surveying and administered his estate. He was a charter member of the Society of Cincinnati. Their home near Louisville was known as "Soldiers' Retreat."
