= Hurstbourne, Kentucky =

- City
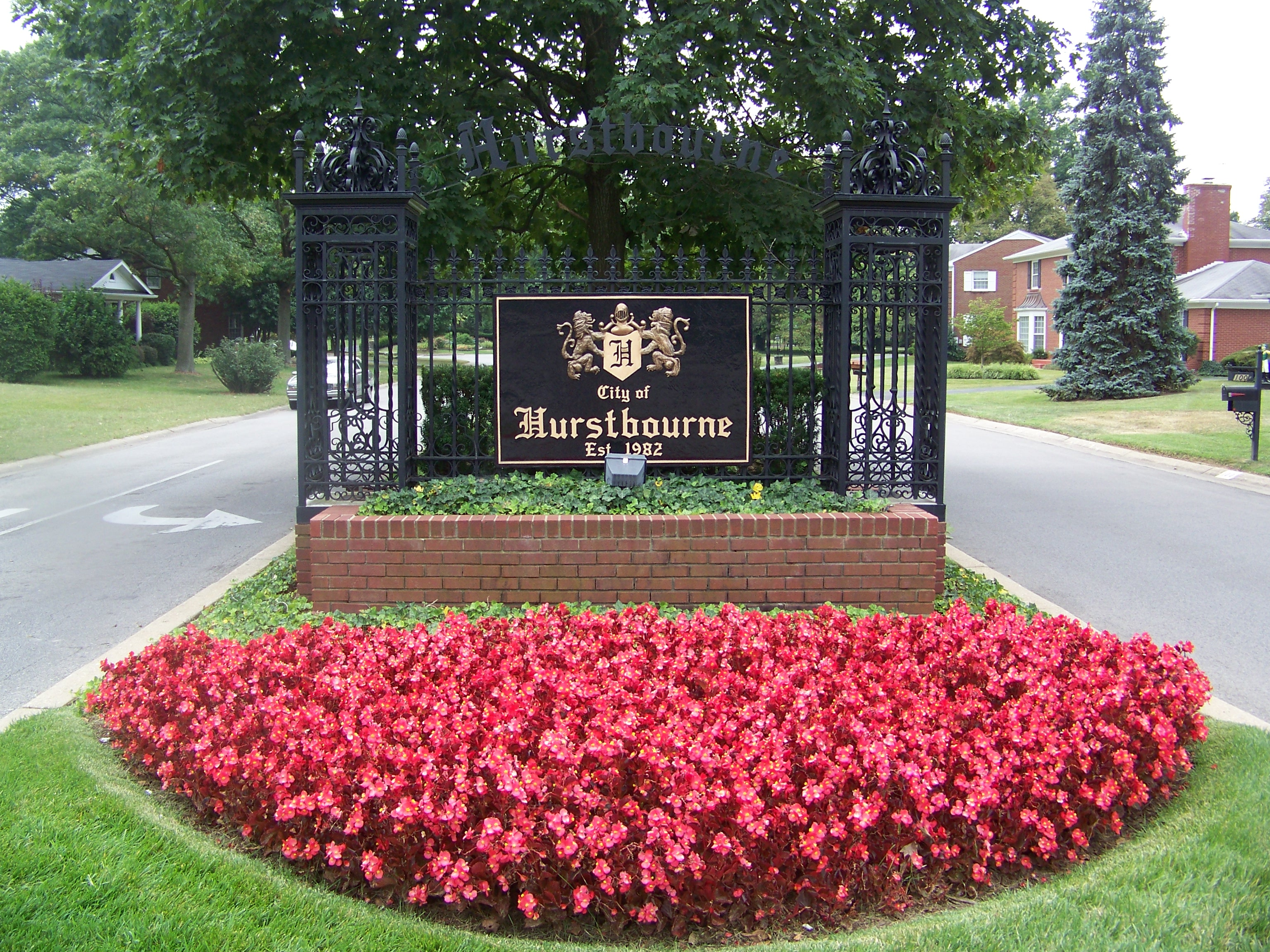
- Hurstbourne entrance at US 60 and Lyndon Lane

- Location of Hurstbourne in Jefferson County, Kentucky

- Location within Kentucky Location within the United States
- Coordinates: 38°14′17″N 85°35′21″W
- Country: United States
- State: Kentucky
- County: Jefferson
- Incorporated: 1982
- Named for: a local farm

Area
  - Total: 1.81 sq mi (4.69 km^{2})
  - Land: 1.80 sq mi (4.66 km^{2})
  - Water: 0.012 sq mi (0.03 km^{2})
- Elevation: 630 ft (190 m)

Population (2020)
  - Total: 4,683
  - Estimate (2024): 4,777
  - Density: 2,600.9/sq mi (1,004.23/km^{2})
- Time zone: UTC-5 (Eastern (EST))
  - Summer (DST): UTC-4 (EDT)
- ZIP Code: 40222
- FIPS code: 21-38814
- GNIS feature ID: 2404748
- Website: www.hurstbourne.org

Hurstbourne is a home rule-class city in Jefferson County, Kentucky, United States. As of the 2020 census, Hurstbourne had a population of 4,683. It is part of the Louisville Metro Government.

== History ==
The land of the present city was part of a military grant to Henry Harrison. It was surveyed by John Floyd in 1774 and first settled by Maj. William Linn, who erected Linn's Station along Beargrass Creek in 1779. It was probably located along the east side of what is now Hurstbourne Parkway and at the time formed a part of the road from the Falls of the Ohio to Fort Harrod. The victims of the 1781 Long Run Massacre were on their way to this site from Squire Boone's Station when they were attacked by Indians and British soldiers. Finding their claim to the land's title questionable, Linn's heirs abandoned the site in the 1790s.

In 1789, however, Colonel Richard Anderson purchased 500 acres (2.0 km^{2}) of land in the area and established his estate under the name "Soldier's Retreat". His house suffered damage in the 1811 earthquake, was struck by lightning, and was demolished in the 1840s. By 1842, John Jeremiah Jacob owned the property and erected Lyndon Hall, now part of the Hurstbourne Country Club's clubhouse.

In 1915, the Hert family acquired the property and renamed it "Hurstbourne". Hurstbourne Parkway was created in 1935 when an earlier lane was widened. By 1965, the property was called "Highbaugh Farms" and, owing to the expansion of Louisville, commercial and residential development began. It incorporated as a city in 1982 to prevent its annexation by Louisville. Almost all of the available land inside the city's limits was developed by 1990.

Development in the 1970s, however, rediscovered the ruins of the Anderson house, which was excavated and rebuilt by local developer Leroy Highbaugh Jr. He moved his family into the rebuilt Soldier's Retreat in 1983, and it now forms a local landmark.

== Geography ==
Hurstbourne is located in east-central Jefferson County. According to the United States Census Bureau, the city has a total area of 1.8 square miles (4.7 km^{2}), of which 0.01 square miles (0.03 km^{2}), or 0.63%, are water.

Hurstbourne is bounded by Shelbyville Road (U.S. Route 60) to its north, Hurstbourne Parkway to its east, I-64 to its south, and Oxmoor Farm and Oxmoor Center to its west. Neighboring cities include Lyndon and Bellemeade to the north, and Jeffersontown to the east. The area surrounding the intersection of I-64 and Hurstbourne Parkway can be considered an edge city to Louisville, with office parks, shopping centers, and an industrial park all concentrated within a few blocks of the parkway, and residential neighborhoods further off, all on land that was largely undeveloped 40 years earlier.

== Demographics ==
Historical population
Census	Pop.	Note	%±
1990	4,420		—
2000	3,884		−12.1%
2010	4,216		8.5%
2020	4,683		11.1%
2024 (est.)	4,777		2.0%
U.S. Decennial Census

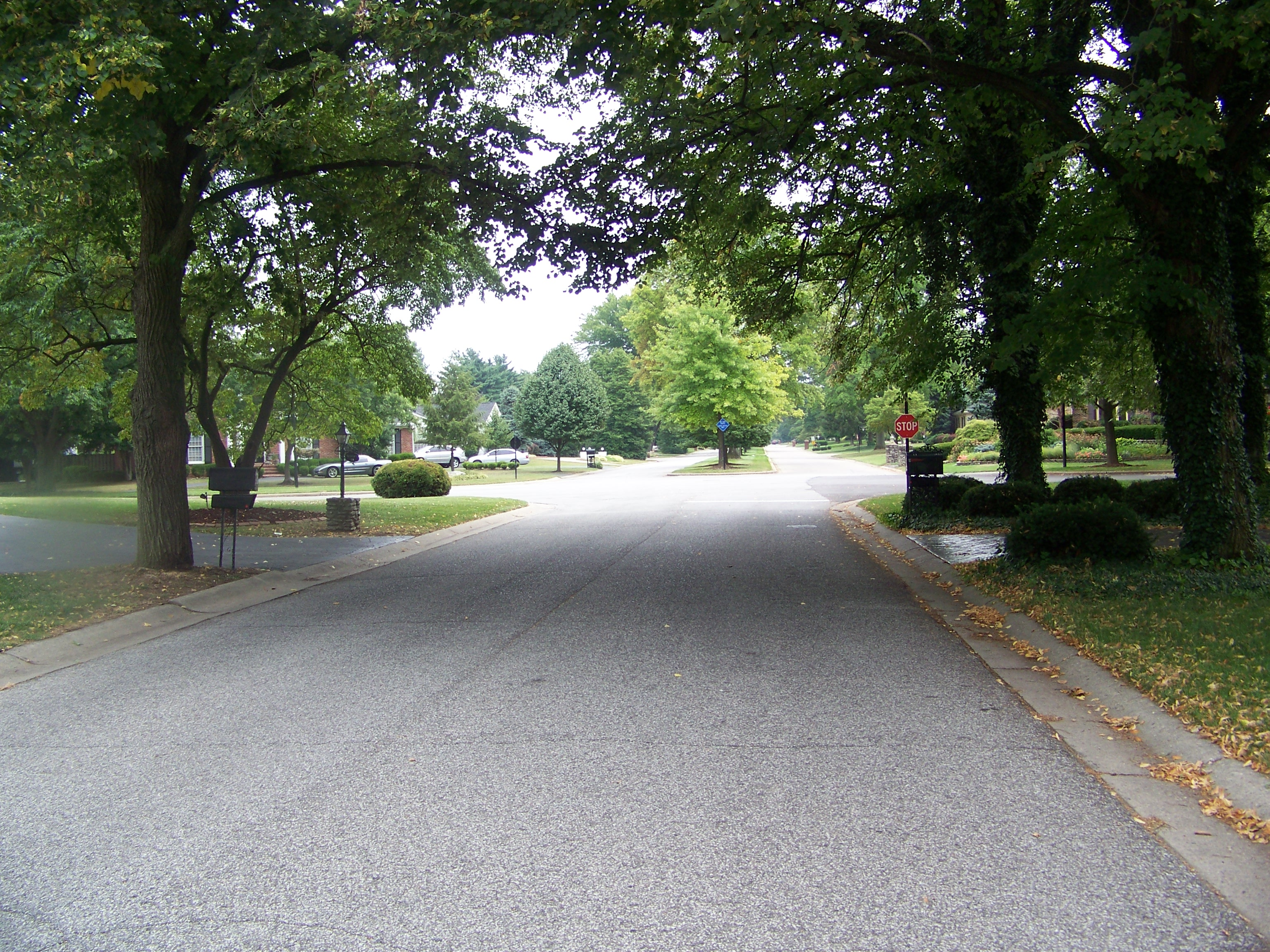
Summer day in Hurstbourne

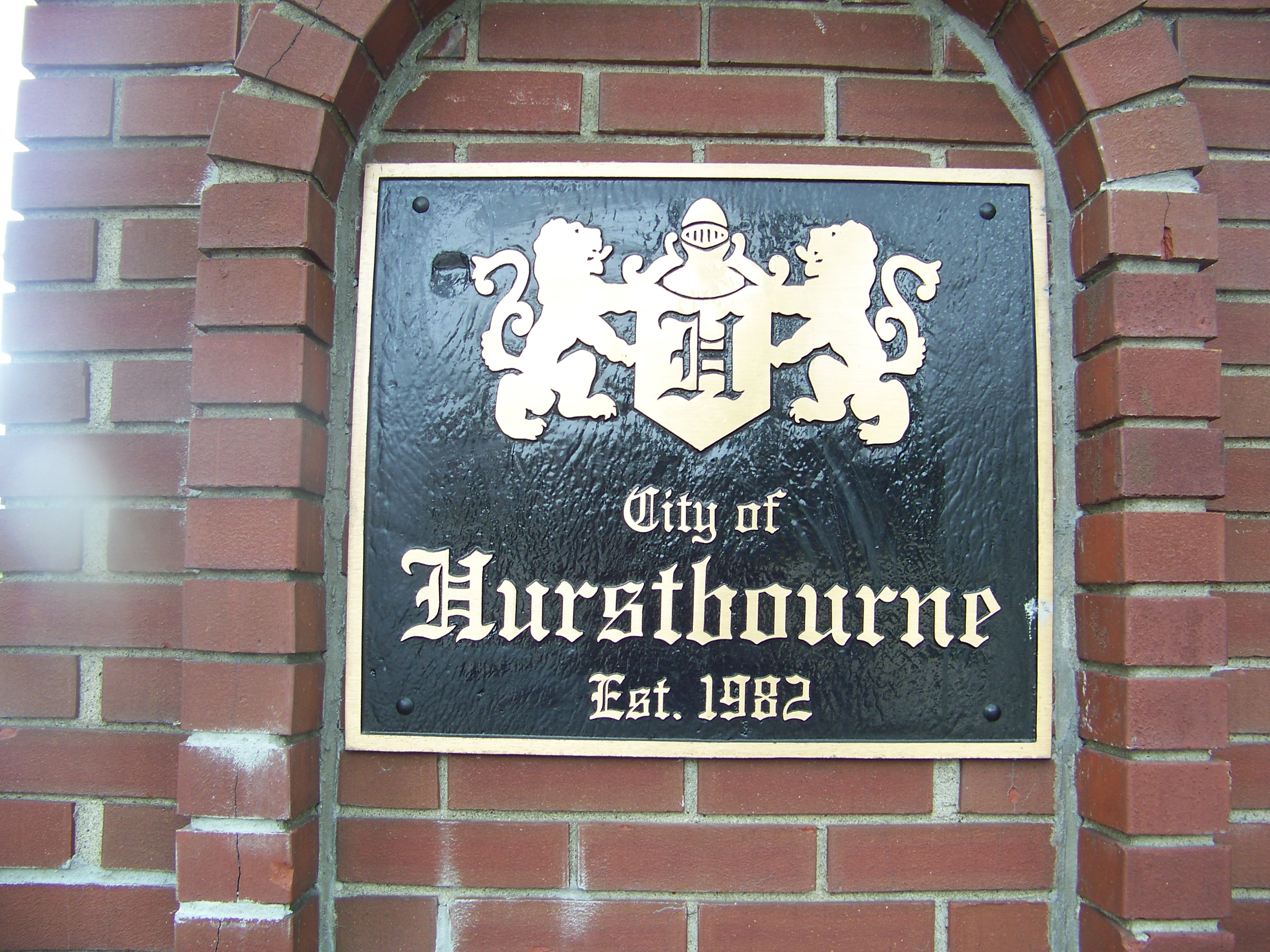
Hurstbourne entrance marker

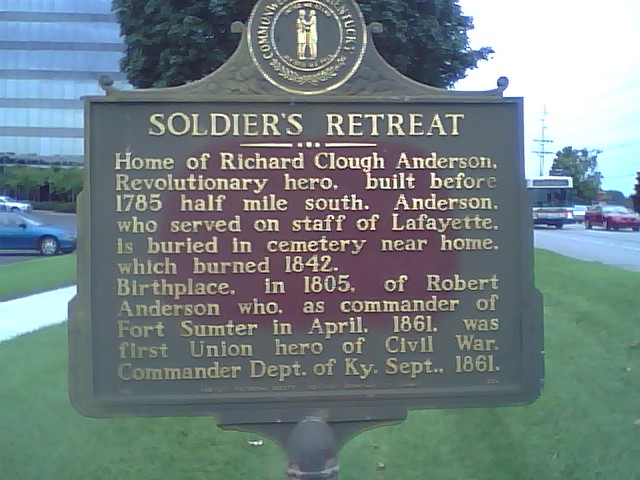
Historical marker

=== 2020 census ===
As of the 2020 census, Hurstbourne had a population of 4,683. The median age was 43.3 years. 22.1% of residents were under the age of 18 and 26.0% of residents were 65 years of age or older. For every 100 females there were 92.7 males, and for every 100 females age 18 and over there were 89.7 males age 18 and over.

100.0% of residents lived in urban areas, while 0.0% lived in rural areas.

There were 1,986 households in Hurstbourne, of which 31.5% had children under the age of 18 living in them. Of all households, 58.9% were married-couple households, 14.0% were households with a male householder and no spouse or partner present, and 24.5% were households with a female householder and no spouse or partner present. About 28.8% of all households were made up of individuals and 18.2% had someone living alone who was 65 years of age or older.

There were 2,122 housing units, of which 6.4% were vacant. The homeowner vacancy rate was 1.1% and the rental vacancy rate was 9.1%.

Racial composition as of the 2020 census
Race	Number	Percent
White	3,411	72.8%
Black or African American	181	3.9%
American Indian and Alaska Native	13	0.3%
Asian	870	18.6%
Native Hawaiian and Other Pacific Islander	0	0.0%
Some other race	39	0.8%
Two or more races	169	3.6%
Hispanic or Latino (of any race)	107	2.3%

=== 2000 census ===
As of the 2000 census, there were 3,884 people, 1,699 households, and 1,199 families residing in the city. The population density was 2,077.1 inhabitants per square mile (802.0/km^{2}). There were 1,887 housing units at an average density of 1,009.1 units per square mile (389.6 units/km^{2}). The racial makeup of the city was 91.45% White, 3.01% African American, 0.10% Native American, 4.25% Asian, 0.23% from other races, and 0.95% from two or more races. Hispanic or Latino of any race were 1.08% of the population.

There were 1,699 households, out of which 22.0% had children under the age of 18 living with them, 65.7% were married couples living together, 3.6% had a female householder with no husband present, and 29.4% were non-families. 27.7% of all households were made up of individuals, and 17.1% had someone living alone who was 65 years of age or older. The average household size was 2.29 and the average family size was 2.78.

In the city, the population was spread out, with 18.4% under the age of 18, 4.3% from 18 to 24, 16.7% from 25 to 44, 36.8% from 45 to 64, and 23.8% who were 65 years of age or older. The median age was 51 years. For every 100 females, there were 87.8 males. For every 100 females age 18 and over, there were 82.9 males.

The median income for a household in the city was $88,972, and the median income for a family was $106,450. Males had a median income of $98,616 versus $35,029 for females. The per capita income for the city was $49,328. About 1.3% of families and 3.1% of the population were below the poverty line, including 1.9% of those under age 18 and 6.1% of those age 65 or over.
