= W. R. Graves =

20th century American politician

Member of the Wisconsin State Assembly from the Crawford County district
- In office January 5, 1931 – January 2, 1933
- Preceded by: Archie J. McDowell
- Succeeded by: Thorleif A. Peterson

District Attorney of Crawford County, Wisconsin
- In office January 1, 1903 – January 1, 1907
- Preceded by: Ormsby B. Thomas
- Succeeded by: John Scott Earll

Wisconsin Circuit Court Clerk for Crawford County, Wisconsin
- In office January 1, 1899 – January 1, 1903
- Preceded by: Norman T. Bull
- Succeeded by: William Atchison

Personal details
- Born: January 29, 1873 Haney, Wisconsin, U.S.
- Died: June 18, 1949 (aged 76) Prairie du Chien, Wisconsin, U.S.
- Resting place: Evergreen Cemetery, Prairie du Chien
- Party: Republican
- Spouse: Martha Horsfall
- Children: Florence Graves^{(b. 1907; died 1922)}; Roswell Horsfall Graves^{(b. 1910; died 1997)}; Lisetta Dorothea (Lautz)^{(b. 1912; died 2005)}; David Alanson Graves^{(b. 1915; died 2000)}
- Education: University of Wisconsin; University of Chicago Law School
- Profession: Lawyer

William Roswell Graves (January 29, 1873 – June 18, 1949) was an American educator, lawyer, and Republican politician from Crawford County, Wisconsin. He was a member of the Wisconsin State Assembly, representing Crawford County during the 1931–1932 legislative session. He also served as district attorney and circuit court clerk. His name was often abbreviated as W. R. Graves.

== Biography ==
W. R. Graves was born on January 29, 1873, in the town of Haney, in Crawford County, Wisconsin. He graduated from Boscobel High School, and taught school in Grant County, Wisconsin, before attending the University of Wisconsin and earning his bachelor's degree in 1895. He continued working as an educator and worked as a principal for several schools in southern Crawford County.

While working as a principal in Soldiers Grove, Wisconsin, in 1898, he was elected Wisconsin circuit court clerk for Crawford County. While working as clerk of the court, he decided to obtain a formal legal education and graduated from the University of Chicago Law School in 1902. The same year he graduated, he was elected district attorney of Crawford County, serving a four-year term. While serving as district attorney in Prairie du Chien, he formed a law partnership with John Scott Earll, known as Graves & Earll. This firm became his primary business interest for the remainder of his life.

Graves remained involved in education issues as well, and in 1919 he was appointed to the state board of education by Governor Emanuel L. Philipp, serving a two-year term.

Graves was elected to the Wisconsin State Assembly in 1930, running on the Republican Party ticket. He prevailed in a crowded Republican primary, receiving 45% of the vote over his three opponents. He went on to win the general election with 55%, defeating Democrat Thorleif A. Peterson. Graves sought re-election in 1932, but the political environment had dramatically shifted toward the Democratic Party in the midst of the Great Depression and Franklin Roosevelt's 1932 presidential campaign. Graves lost a rematch with his 1930 opponent, Thorleif A. Peterson, as the Democrats won their first majority in the Wisconsin State Assembly in 40 years.

Graves did not hold state office again, and largely focused on his legal practice. He died at his home in Prairie du Chien on the morning of June 18, 1949, after a brief illness.

== Personal life and family ==
W. R. Graves was the second of four children born to Alanson and Hannah (née Dowling) Graves. Alanson Graves served as an enlisted volunteer in the 31st Wisconsin Infantry Regiment during the American Civil War, and served through most of Sherman's campaigns through Atlanta and the Carolinas, rising to the rank of sergeant.

W. R. Graves married Martha Horsfall, also a native of Crawford County, on June 24, 1903. They had four children together, though one daughter died young.

In addition to his legal and political work, Graves was active in Freemasonry for over 50 years.

== Electoral history ==
=== Wisconsin Assembly (1930, 1932) ===
Year	Election	Date	Elected				Defeated				Total	Plurality
1930	Primary	Sep. 16	W. R. Graves	Republican	1,815	44.97%	J. D. Stuart	Rep.	755	18.71%	4,036	1,060
1930	Primary	Sep. 16	W. R. Graves	Republican	1,815	44.97%	J. J. McKenna	Rep.	751	18.61%	4,036	1,060
1930	Primary	Sep. 16	W. R. Graves	Republican	1,815	44.97%	Jason C. Russell	Rep.	715	17.72%	4,036	1,060
1930	General	Nov. 4	W. R. Graves	Republican	2,467	54.85%	Thorleif A. Peterson	Dem.	2,031	45.15%	4,498	436
1932	Primary	Sep. 20	W. R. Graves (inc)	Republican	1,899	53.96%	Albert L. Hurlbut	Rep.	1,620	46.04%	3,519	279
1932	General	Nov. 4	Thorleif A. Peterson	Democratic	3,730	56.53%	W. R. Graves (inc)	Rep.	2,868	43.47%	6,598	862

Wisconsin State Assembly
Preceded by Archie J. McDowell	Member of the Wisconsin State Assembly from the Crawford County district January 5, 1931 – January 2, 1933	Succeeded by Thorleif A. Peterson
Legal offices
Preceded by Norman T. Bull	Wisconsin Circuit Court Clerk for Crawford County, Wisconsin; January 1, 1899 – January 1, 1903	Succeeded by William Atchison
Preceded by Ormsby B. Thomas	District Attorney of Crawford County, Wisconsin; January 1, 1903 – January 1, 1907	Succeeded by John Scott Earll
