= Child soldiers in the American Civil War =

American Civil War topic

Throughout the American Civil War, approximately 250,000–420,000 males under the age of 18 were involved in both Union and Confederate forces. It is estimated that 100,000 Union soldiers were 15 years of age or younger. By one estimate, approximately ten percent of Union soldiers were underaged (the Confederate army likely had a similar proportion of underage soldiers).

== Reasons for joining ==
When the surrender of Fort Sumter was announced, boys and men of all ages (7–17) on both sides of the conflict were permitted to enlist. Abraham Lincoln initially called for 90-day enlistments. However, after the Union army was driven out of Richmond in the Peninsula campaign, and after the Confederate Army began to march to Washington, Lincoln issued a call for 300,000 three-year volunteers.

Boys had many of the same motives for joining the military as their adult counterparts did. In the North, boys felt a desire to defend the North and the union. Southern boys wanted to repel the North, whom they viewed as hostile invaders.

A key difference between boys and adults was their attitude towards slavery: in general, boys on both sides had neutral feelings towards slavery. Thus, few were motivated to fight for or against it.

The most popular reason boys joined the military was to escape farm work or an abusive family life. (In 1860 the population of the United States was mostly rural.)

== Methods of enlistment ==
Although the official minimum enlistment age was 18, there were various ways boys got around this.

First, a boy's appearance often fooled recruiters. It was common for teenagers to appear much older than they were. This was made easier during the chaos that often occurred at recruiting stations when new units were hastily formed.

Secondly, it was easy to lie about one's age, especially given the fact that modern methods of identification (social security, driver's license, computer databases) did not exist at that time. Furthermore, recruiters were anxious to fill recruitment quotas. So, even though they were required to certify on the enlistment papers that they judged the volunteer to be of lawful age, they often turned a blind eye to an underage recruit. Such recruitment passivity increased as the manpower on both sides dwindled and both sides were desperate for more help. One trick was to have an underage recruit write "18" on his shoes and truthfully reply to the recruiter "I am over 18."

Third, some underage boys were able to enlist with the endorsement of an adult. Ned Hutter, sixteen years old, joined the Confederate Army in Mississippi. His father vouched for Ned's work ethic and shooting ability. The recruiter then accepted Ned into the unit.

Despite such workarounds, many other boys joined the military legitimately by signing up for non-combat positions. Many such youths signed up as musicians (such as drummers, buglers, flautists). There were places for 40,000 such positions in the Union Armies. They often performed other tasks, such as carrying canteens, bandages, and stretchers, to assist surgeons and nurses with the wounded; relaying orders on the battlefield; few participated in the fighting.

== Conditions ==
=== Food ===
The biggest complaint of underage soldiers during the Civil War was the lack of food. Feeding an army relied on many factors, including gathering, loading, and transporting food. If any of these processes were delayed, or if any miscommunications would occur, it could be days or weeks before the army was fed.

Hardtack was a staple food item, to the boys' chagrin: "After we had been in the field a year or two the call, 'Fall in for your hard-tack!' was leisurely responded to by only about a dozen men.... Hard-tack was very hard. This attributed to its great age, for there was a common belief among the boys that our hard-tack had been baked long before the beginning of the Christian era. This opinion was based upon the fact that the letters 'B.C.' was stamped on many, if not, indeed, all the cracker-boxes."

Other staples included pork, coffee, and bread.

Starving boys often devised intricate ways to sneak out of their camps and forage for food. They found food by either gathering it from the local land, or stealing it from local farmers. In the Union Army, some soldiers initially objected to this practice as violating the Ten Commandments. But as the war wore on, it became evident that "such tender regard for Rebel property" strengthened the enemy and weakened the Union cause. Consequently, "conscientious scruples stepped to the rear, and the soldier who had them at the end of the war was a curiosity indeed." Commanding officers forbade foraging, but often connived it and shared in the spoils.

=== Clothing ===
Clothing was a crude procedure for both armies, especially towards the beginning of the war. Once colors and patterns were agreed upon, uniforms were more easily standardized. However, boys often found themselves in uniforms that were too big. Additionally, many boys continued to grow after being assigned a uniform, and many outgrew their uniforms.

Some units did not have the resources to provide uniforms to boys, so many had to wear their own clothes from home.

As a result, many boys often resorted to stealing uniforms from deceased soldiers, or bartering food and supplies in order to have their clothes tailored by locals.

=== Marching ===
Excitement over enlistment swiftly gave way to the boring routines of camp life and marches.

"Day after day and night after night did we tramp along the rough and dusty roads 'neath the most broiling sun with which the month of August ever afflicted a soldier; thro' rivers and their rocky valleys, over mountains—on, on, scarcely stopping to gather the green corn from the fields to serve us for rations.... During these marches the men are sometimes unrecognizable on account of the thick coverings of dust which settle upon their hair, eye-brows and beard, filling likewise the mouth, nose, eyes, and ears."

=== Death, injury, and capture ===
These children were not spared from the horrors of war that their adult counterparts faced, including violent deaths, injuries, poor medical treatment, and appalling living conditions when captured.

Young soldiers' romantic illusions about military glory evaporated under the harsh realities of combat. They suffered hunger, fatigue, and discomfort, and gradually lost their innocence in combat. Every aspect of soldiering comes alive in their letters and diaries: spoiled meat, the deafening sound of cannons, the sight of maimed bodies, and randomness and anonymity of death.

The accounts of young Union prisoners at Confederate prison camps are especially harrowing. Sixteen-year-old Michael Dougherty was shocked by the sight of "different instruments of torture: stocks, thumb screws, barbed iron collars, shackles, ball and chain. Our prison keepers seemed to handle them with familiarity." William Smith, a fifteen-year-old soldier in the 14th Illinois Infantry, was shaken by the physical appearance of prisoners at Andersonville in Georgia, a "great mass of gaunt, unnatural-looking beings, soot-begrimes, and clad in filthy trousers."

Michael Dougherty was the only member of his company to survive imprisonment at Andersonville Prison in Georgia.

"No one, except he was there in the prison can form anything like a correct idea of our appearance about this time. We had been in prison for nearly five months and our clothing was worn out. A number were entire naked; some would have a ragged shirt and no pants; some had pants and no shirt; another would have shoes and a cap and nothing else. Their flesh was wasted away, leaving the chaffy, weather beaten skin drawn tight over the bones, the hip bones and shoulders standing out. Their faces and exposed parts of their bodies were covered with smoky black soot, from the dense smoke of pitch pine we had hovered over, and our long matted hair was stiff and black with the same substance, which water would have no effect on, and soap was not to be had. I would not attempt to describe the sick and dying, who could now be seen on every side."

=== Offenses and punishments ===
Boys committed the same offenses as their adult counterparts, and their commanding officers did not spare them from punishment.

Offenses included:

- "Back talking" (i.e. addressing a superior with insolence) or refusal to follow military etiquette
- Drunkenness
- Absence from camp without leave
- "Turbulence after taps" (i.e. causing a commotion after lights-out)
- Sitting while on guard
- Gambling
- Cowardice
- Theft

Punishments included:

- Hard labor
- Carrying a log by oneself
- Forcing the offender to stand on a barrel for an entire day
- Confinement to the "guard-tent." A veteran of the Civil War observed that this punishment "may not be though a very severe penalty; still, the men did not enjoy it, as it imposed quite a restriction on their freedom to be thus pent up and cut off from the rest of their associates."
- Confinement in a box
- Lashing the offender to a wheel
- Wearing a board describing the offense
- Being tied up by one's thumbs
- "Drumming out of camp" (usually for cowardice). This punishment involved stripping the offender of his equipment and uniform, and marching him through the camp with a guard on either side, four soldiers behind, and a fife and drum corps bringing up the rear. This gave the rest of the army the chance to publicly humiliate the offender.
- Death by firing squad or hanging (usually for desertion). Abraham Lincoln was so reluctant to approve the death penalty that he became famous (or, at least from the perspective of those in favor of the military's ultimate sanction, infamous) for his last-minute pardons and reprieves. Over time, Generals increasingly demanded executions be carried out before the President would have an opportunity to review them.

== Notable examples ==
Elisha Stockwell, Jr. joined the Union Army at age fifteen. Since this was against his father's wishes, he tricked his father by claiming that he was going to a Dutch dance. He told his sister he'd be back for dinner, but did not return home for two years. He was in the Union Army for the entire duration of the war, participating in battles such as the Battle of Shiloh, the Siege of Vicksburg, and Sherman's March to the Sea. He survived the war and wrote a memoir of his wartime experiences at age 81. His story is cited extensively in the award-winning children's book, The Boys' War.

The most celebrated schoolboy performance of the war was the baptism of fire of the Virginia Military Institute Cadet Corps at the Battle of New Market. The corps was 215 strong when it reached the battle. The boys were eighteen or under (tradition has it that some were only fourteen).

Washington and Lee University provided a company of sixty-four boys in the first days of the Civil War. Their average age was about seventeen, and their average weight was about 130 pounds. Of a total of 65 present in the two battles of Manassas, 23 were killed or wounded. In the forty battles in which it fought with the 4th Virginia Infantry, the company lost 100 dead or wounded, and 46 captured, of a total strength of 150 from recruitments.

=== Union ===
- Mancil V. "Manny" Root. Root was the youngest soldier in the Union Army on record. He was born in Ohio in 1854 and enlisted as a drummer boy at the age of 11, serving in the 36th Wisconsin Infantry. He died in Cedar Rapids, Iowa in 1929.
- Joseph Francis Goss, the youngest combat soldier, serving in the 31st Wisconsin Infantry from December 16, 1862, to July 8, 1865. He was involved in the March to the Sea, Siege of Atlanta and Savannah, and many other battles.
- Willie Johnston, the youngest Medal of Honor recipient in American history, joined Company D of the 3rd Vermont Infantry Regiment with his father in 1861 as a drummer boy at the age of 11. In 1863 The Secretary of war Edwin Stanton awarded Johnston the Medal of Honor for being the only soldier to return from the field with their equipment when retreating during the Seven Days Battles.
- William Black. The Civil War's youngest wounded soldier on record, he was twelve when his left hand and arm were shattered by an exploding shell.
- Courtland Comly Cooper born 1847, of De Kalb, NY, enlisted in the 92nd NY Infantry in 1861 at the age of either 14 or 15, birthdate unknown, and died at Cold Harbor June 1, 1864, while charging the rebel forces.
- Avery Brown enlisted at in 1861 at age 8 as a musician
- John Clem joined the 22nd Michigan Volunteer Infantry Regiment as a drummer boy at 11 years of age, (Murphy) and became a mounted orderly on the staff of George Henry Thomas. At the Battle of Chickamauga, he defiantly killed a Confederate colonel who ordered his surrender. For this, he was promoted to Sergeant. Clem went on to become a career soldier, retiring in 1915 with the rank of Brigadier General.
- George Penfield Bennett born in 1852, enlisted in 1861 in New York, Company B, 1st Marine Regiment, at the age of 9 years and 7 days. Served on the ship his father commanded, the U.S.S. Cossack. He was a "powder monkey," passing ammunition to the gunners from the magazine. During the battle of New Bern he was presented with a pony by General Reno for intrepidity on the battlefield.
- Leonidas Jordan was born in 1845 enlisted in 1861 at age 16
- Private Charles H. Bickford of B Company, 2nd Massachusetts Infantry Regiment; born March 1844, date and place of death, May 3, 1863, at Chancellorsville, Virginia,
- Cornelius Herz. born 1845 enlisted at 16
- Joseph B. Foraker born 1846 enlisted 1862 age 16
- Paul Vandervoort born 1846 enlisted 1862 age 15
- John S. Kountz born 1846 enlisted in 1861 at age 14
- John Cook born 1847 served 1862 and 1863
- George Yost born 1848 served US Navy 1862 age 14
- Orion Howe born 1848 enlisted in 1861 at age 12
- Irwin Warner born 1848 enlisted 1864 age 16
- Charles Edwin King enlisted in 1861 at age 12 in Co F 49th PA Vols as a musician; died of wounds in September 1862 Battle of Antietam
- Charles Smith enlisted in 1861 at age 14 in Co B 49th PA Vols as a musician; captured and paroled; discharged September 1864
- Frederick H. Dyer born 1849 Enlisted as a Drummer boy
- John Whitnah Leedy born 1849 enlisted 1864
- Benjamin Zellner born 1849 served Union army [PA]
- Henry Foote Baker enlisted 1862 age 14
- Newton Peters enlisted in 1861 at age 15
- Samuel Scott enlisted 1862 age 16
- Theodore Penland (1849–1950) enlisted age 16
- Albert Woolson (1850–1956) enlisted 1864
- James A. Clough born 1850 enlisted age 15
- Aspinwall Fuller (born 1851) was a 13-year-old Powder Monkey on the USS New Hampshire in 1864
- Thomas Tad Lincoln (born 1853) was a commissioned lieutenant in 1864
- Galusha Pennypacker is reported to have enlisted in 1861 at age 16.
- Arthur MacArthur Jr., from Wisconsin, failed to get into West Point in 1861, and instead wrangled a place as adjutant of the 24th Wisconsin Volunteer Infantry Regiment at the age of seventeen, and was promoted to colonel (and nicknamed "The Boy Colonel") a year later. He commanded a regiment at the bloody battles of Resaca and Franklin, and was wounded three times. He went into the regular army, and retired in 1909 as the last lieutenant general of his era. He was the father of General Douglas MacArthur.
- John Michael Dunning born 1852 was a drummer boy enlisted at age 10
- William H. H. Hart, born 1848, enlisted in a scout company on January 23, 1862, two days before his fourteenth birthday. He was later elected Attorney General of California.
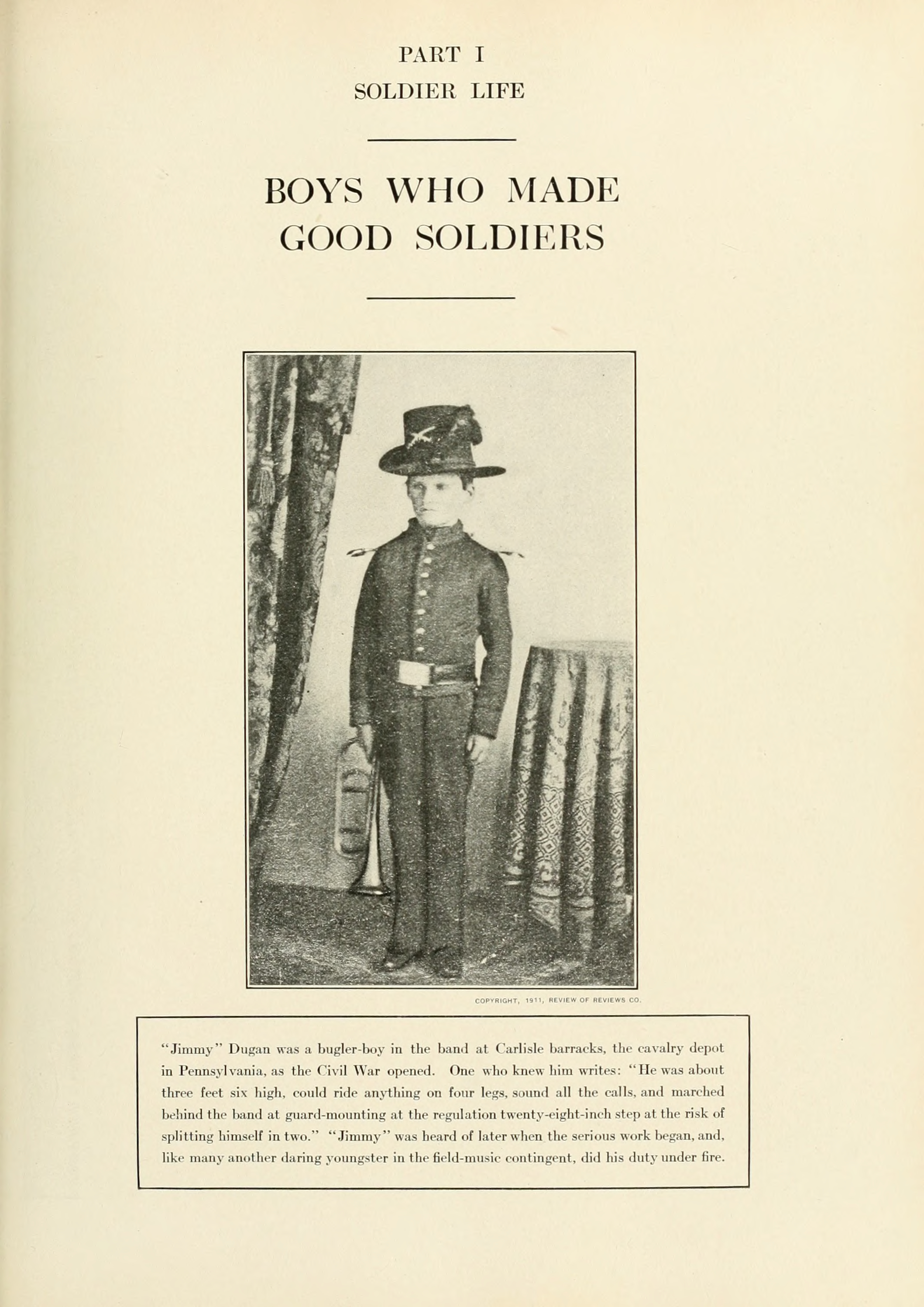
Jimmy Dugan cavalry bugler

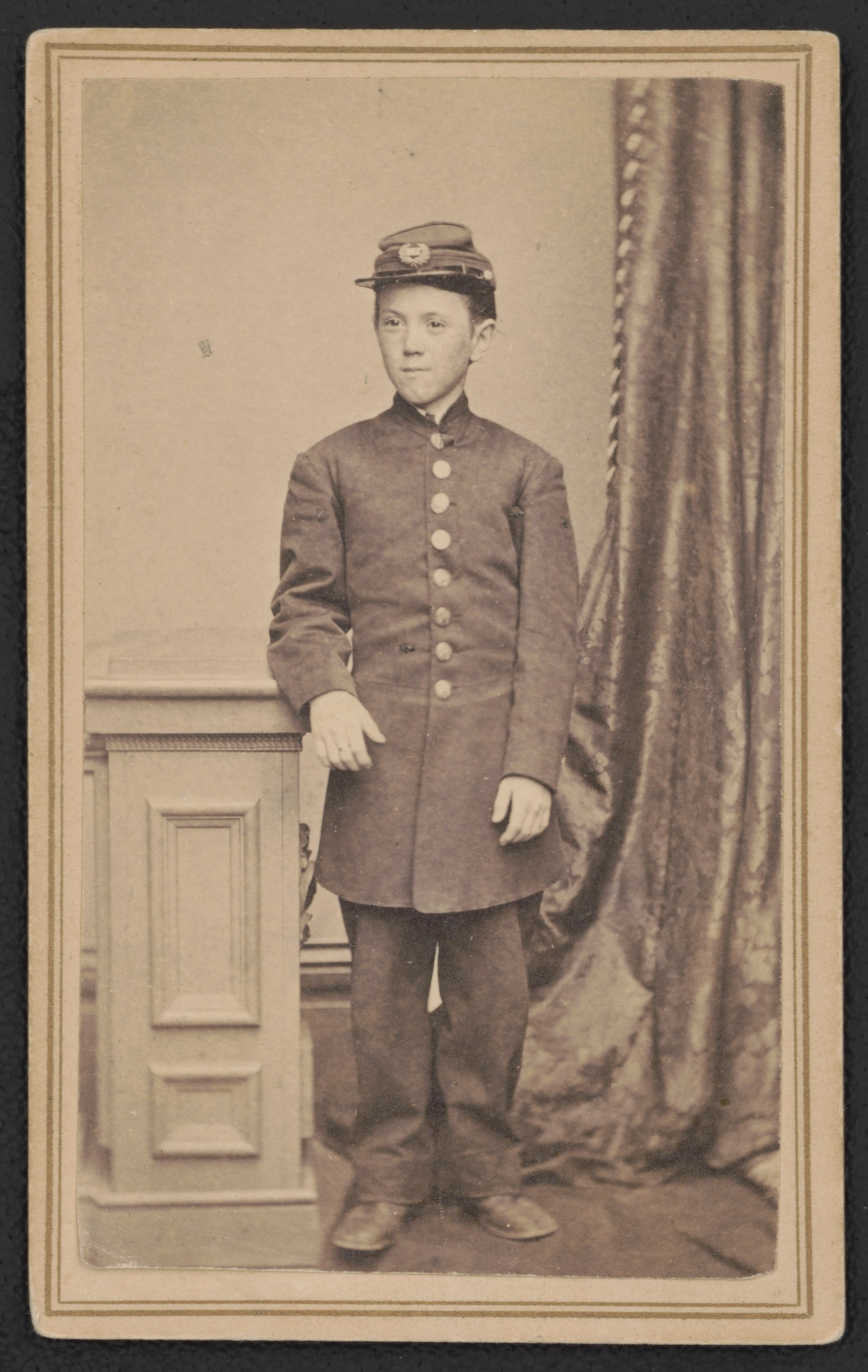
Drummer Jimmy Doyle of Co. B, 18th U.S. Infantry Regiment

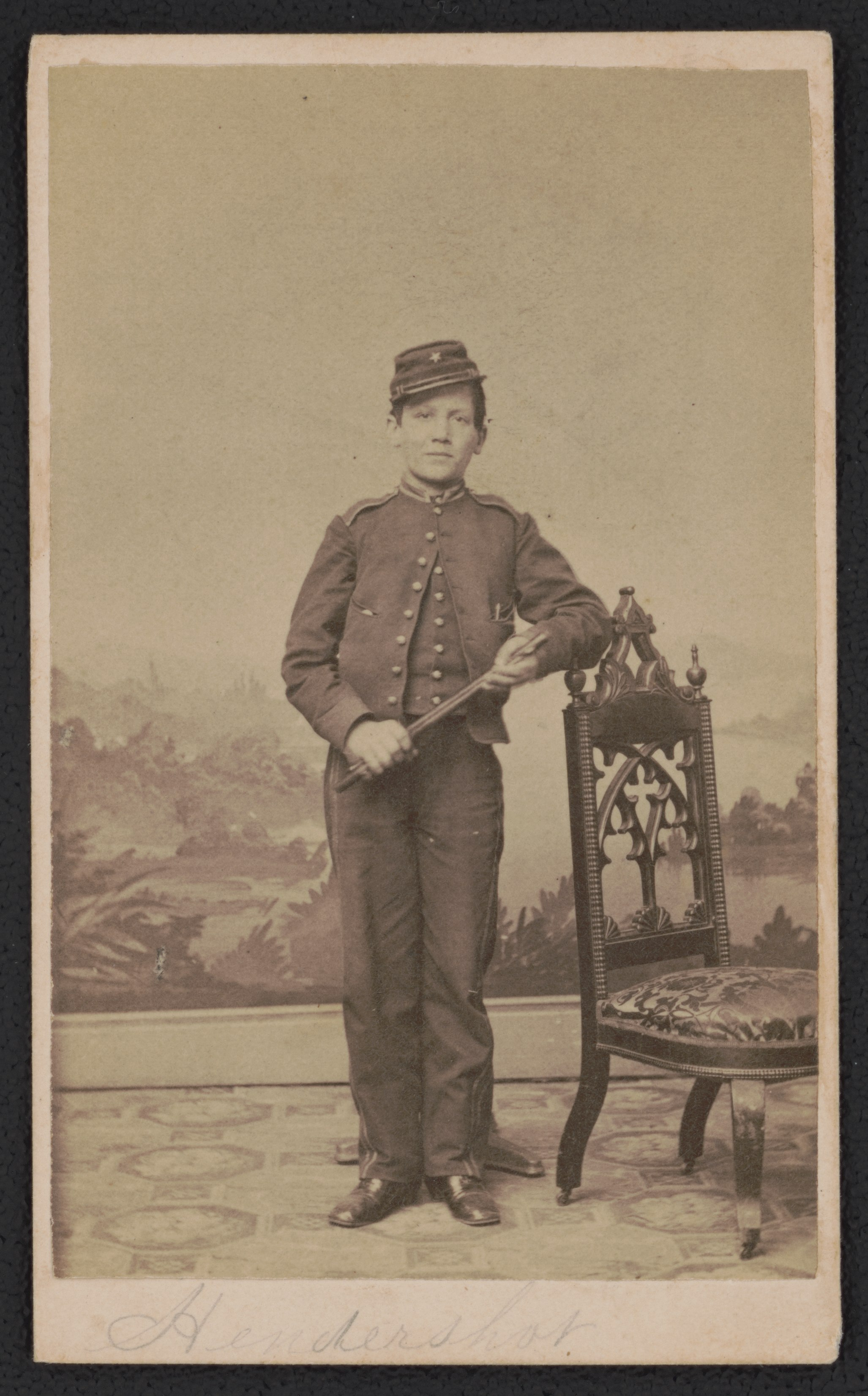
Drummer Robert Henry Hendershot ("Drummer Boy of the Rappahannock") of Co. B, 8th Michigan Infantry Regiment

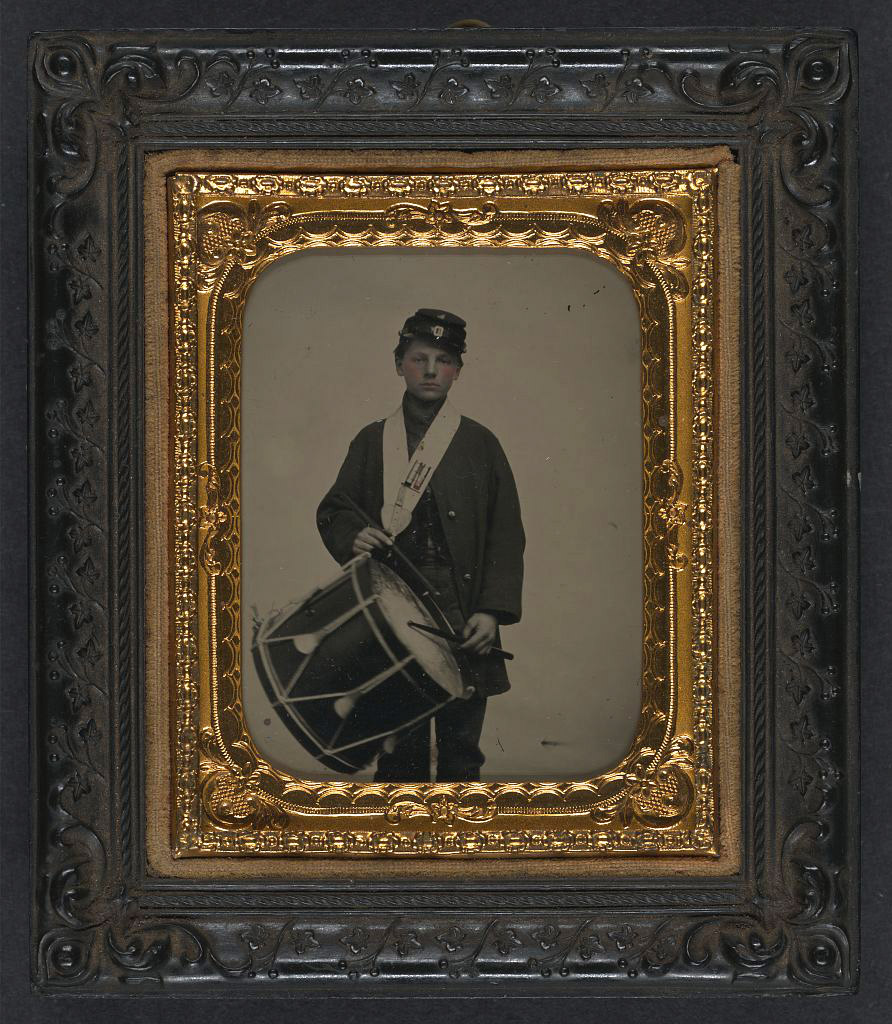
Samuel W. Doble of Company D, 12th Maine Infantry Regiment, with drum

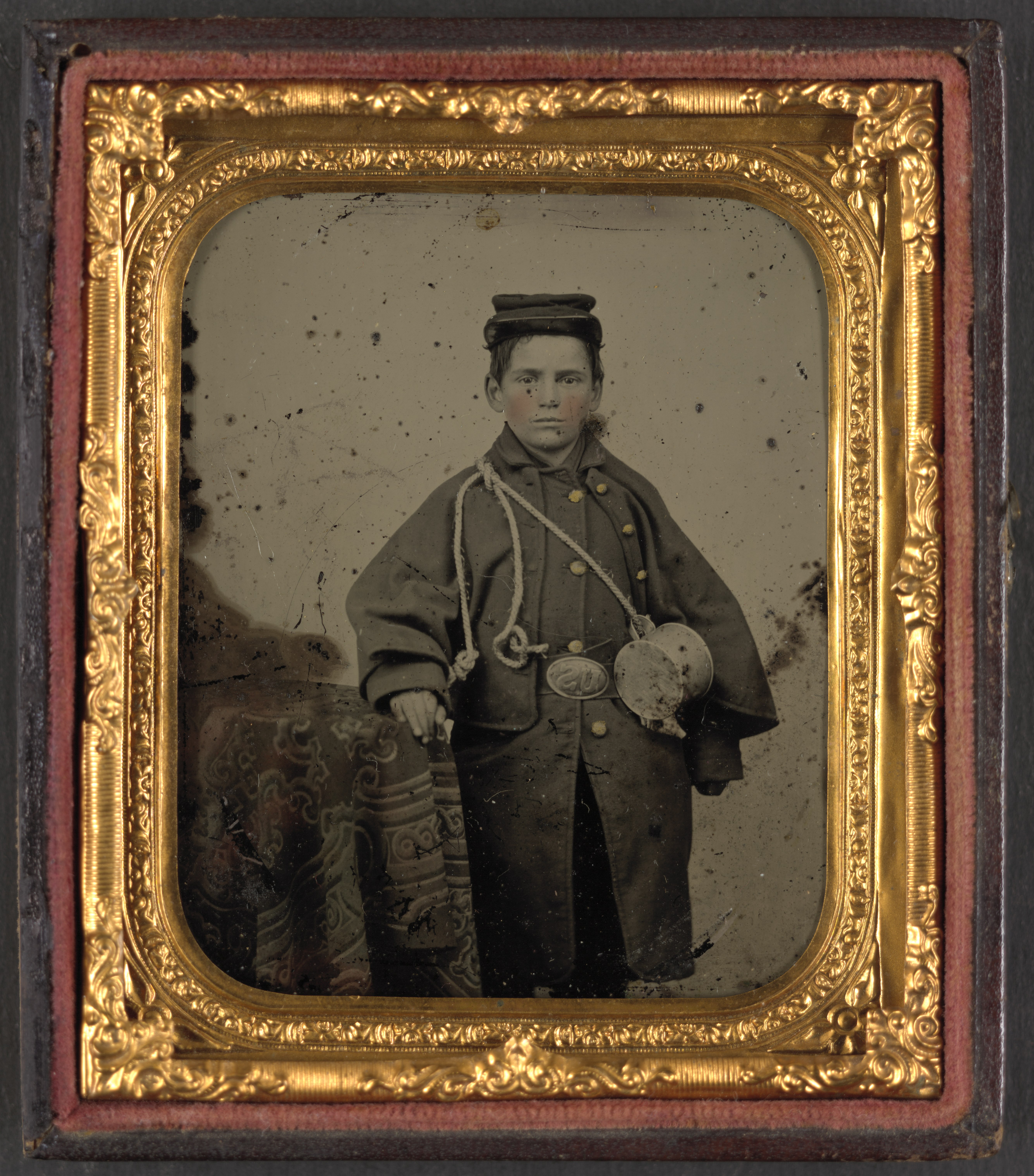
Johnny Jacobs drummer boy

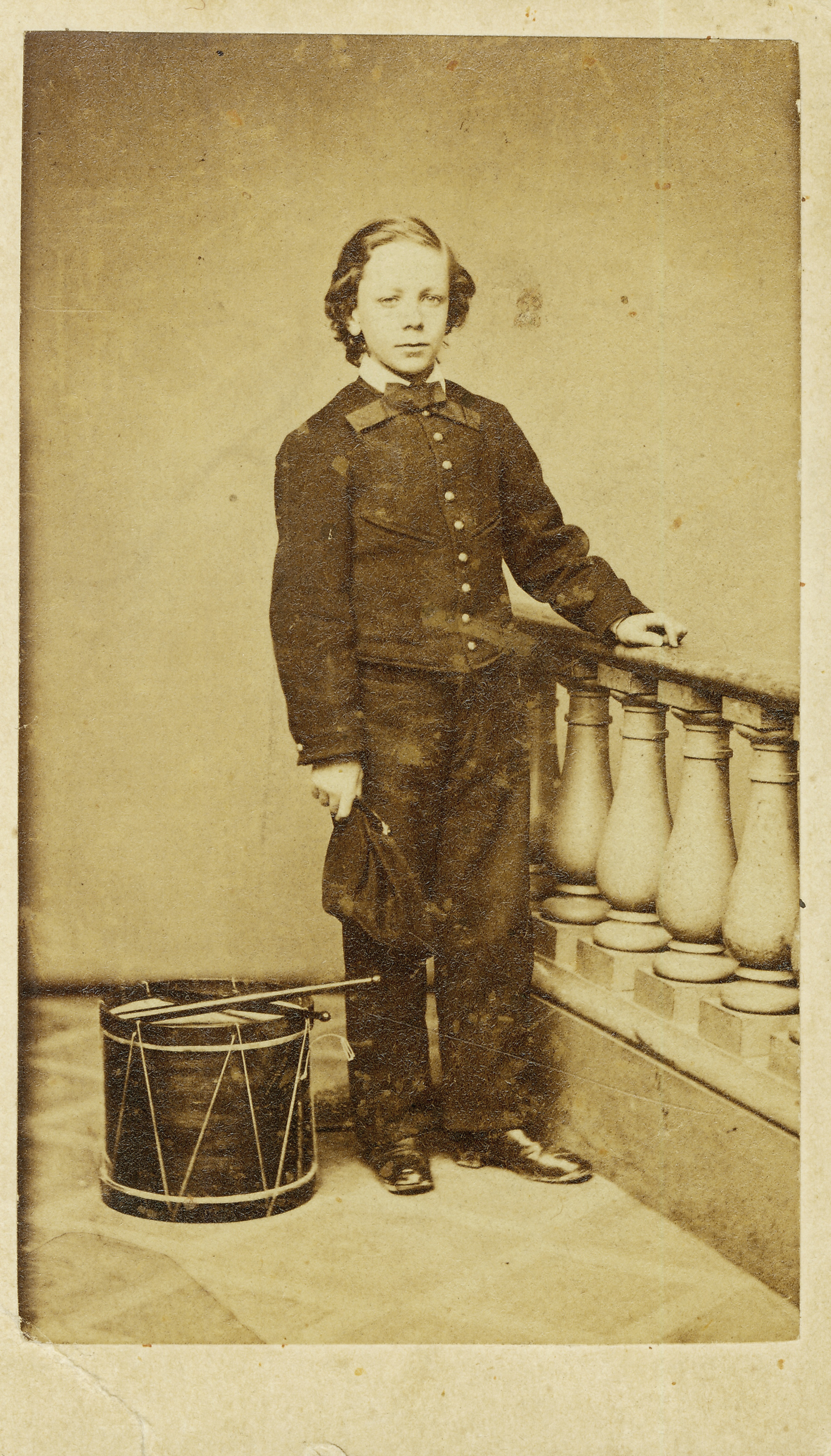
Arthur Gale Drummer boy

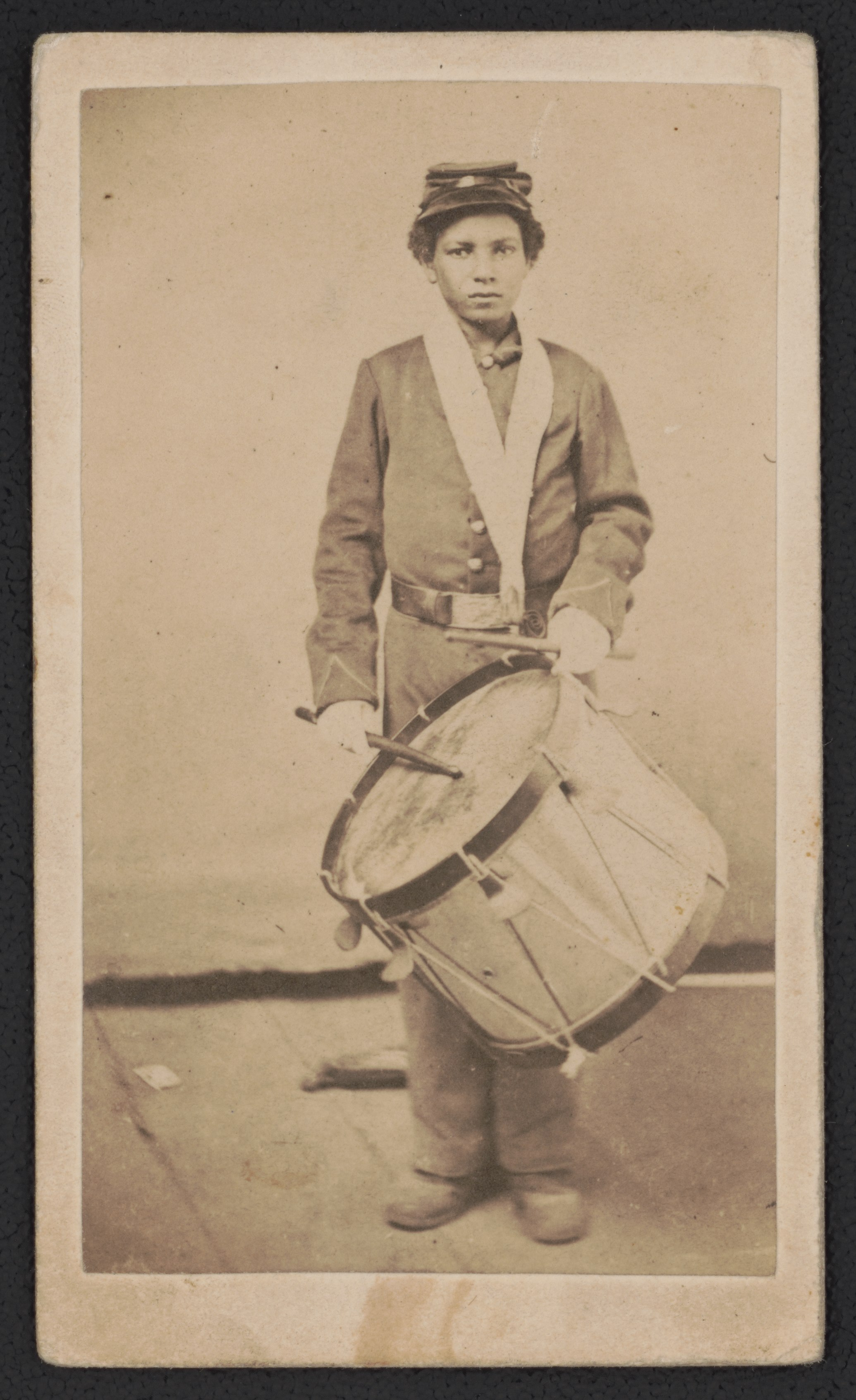
Taylor drummer boy of the 78th USCT

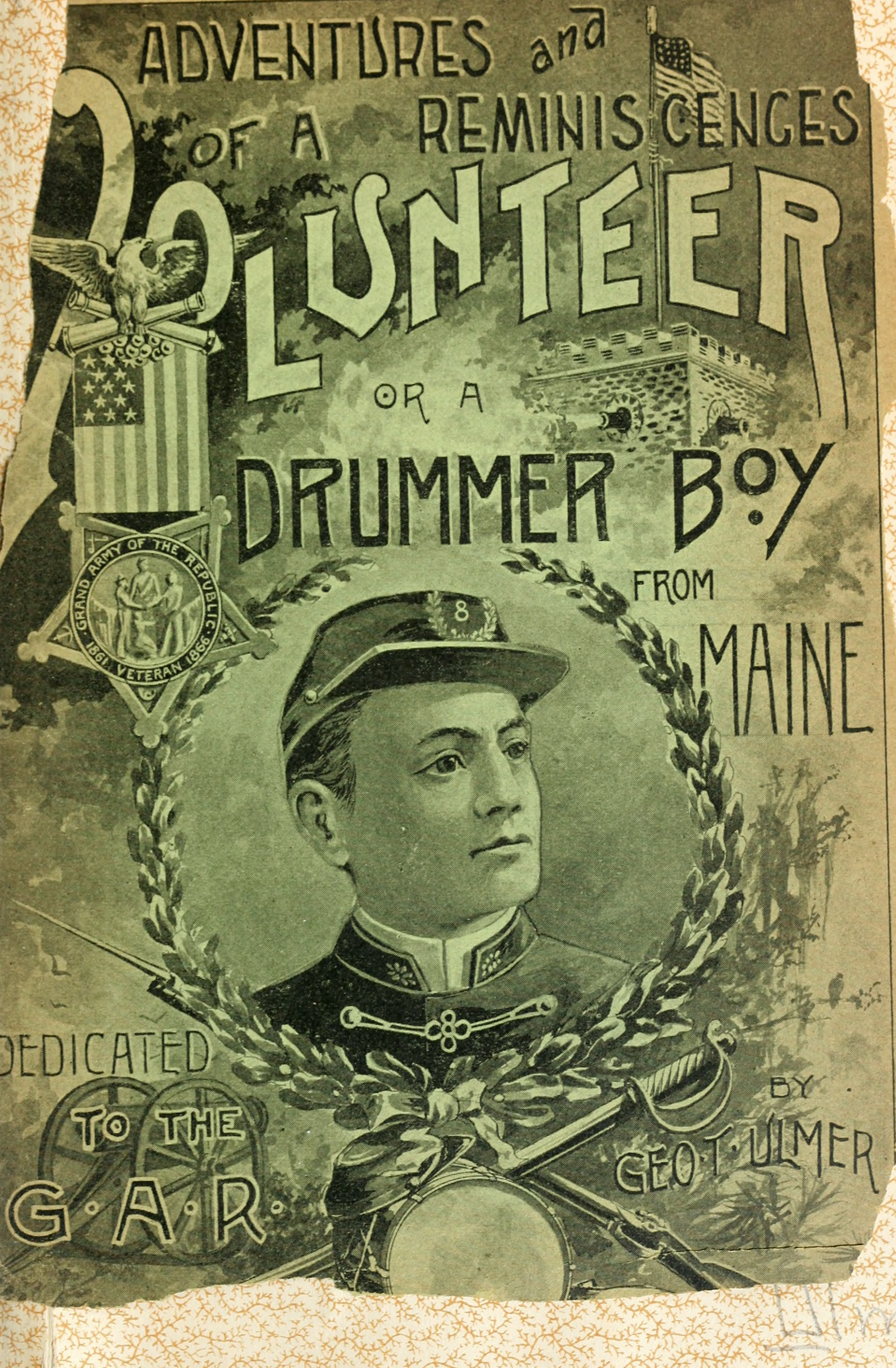
George T. Ulmer

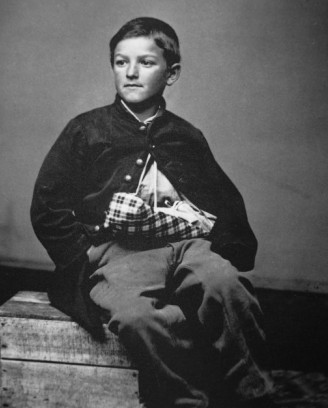
William Black, drummer boy for the Union

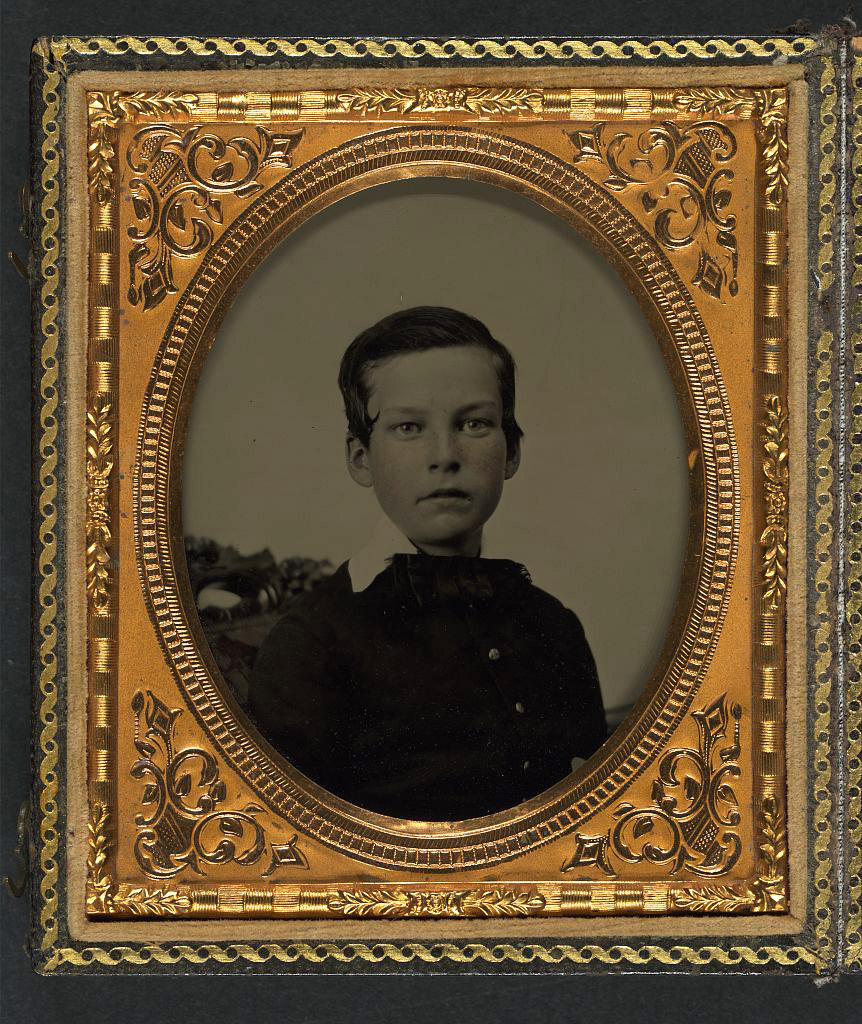
Private Charles H. Bickford of B Company, 2nd Massachusetts Infantry Regiment

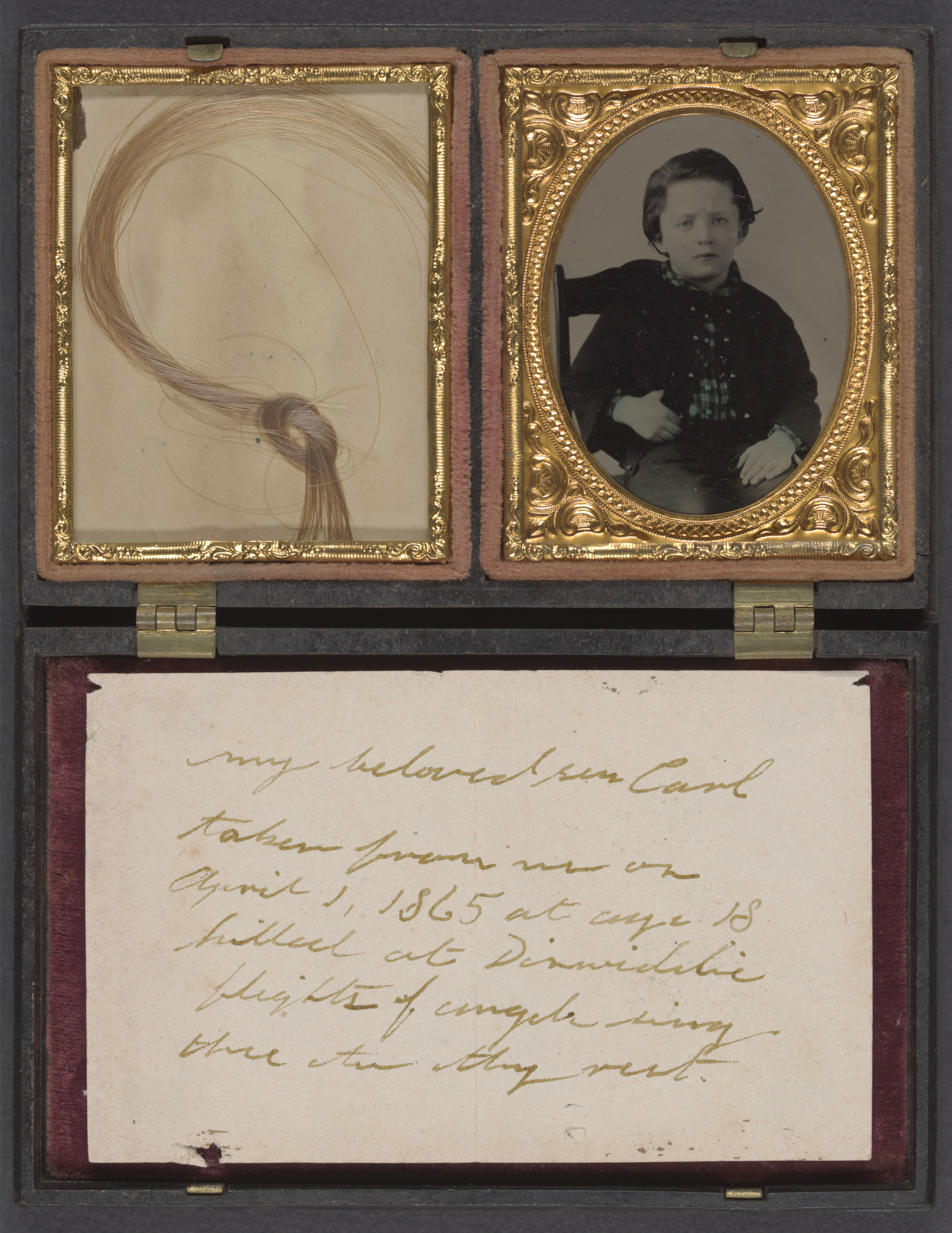
Carlos E. Rogers of Company K, 185th New York, who was killed on either March 29 or 30, 1865, at Quaker Road in Dinwiddie County [age 18]

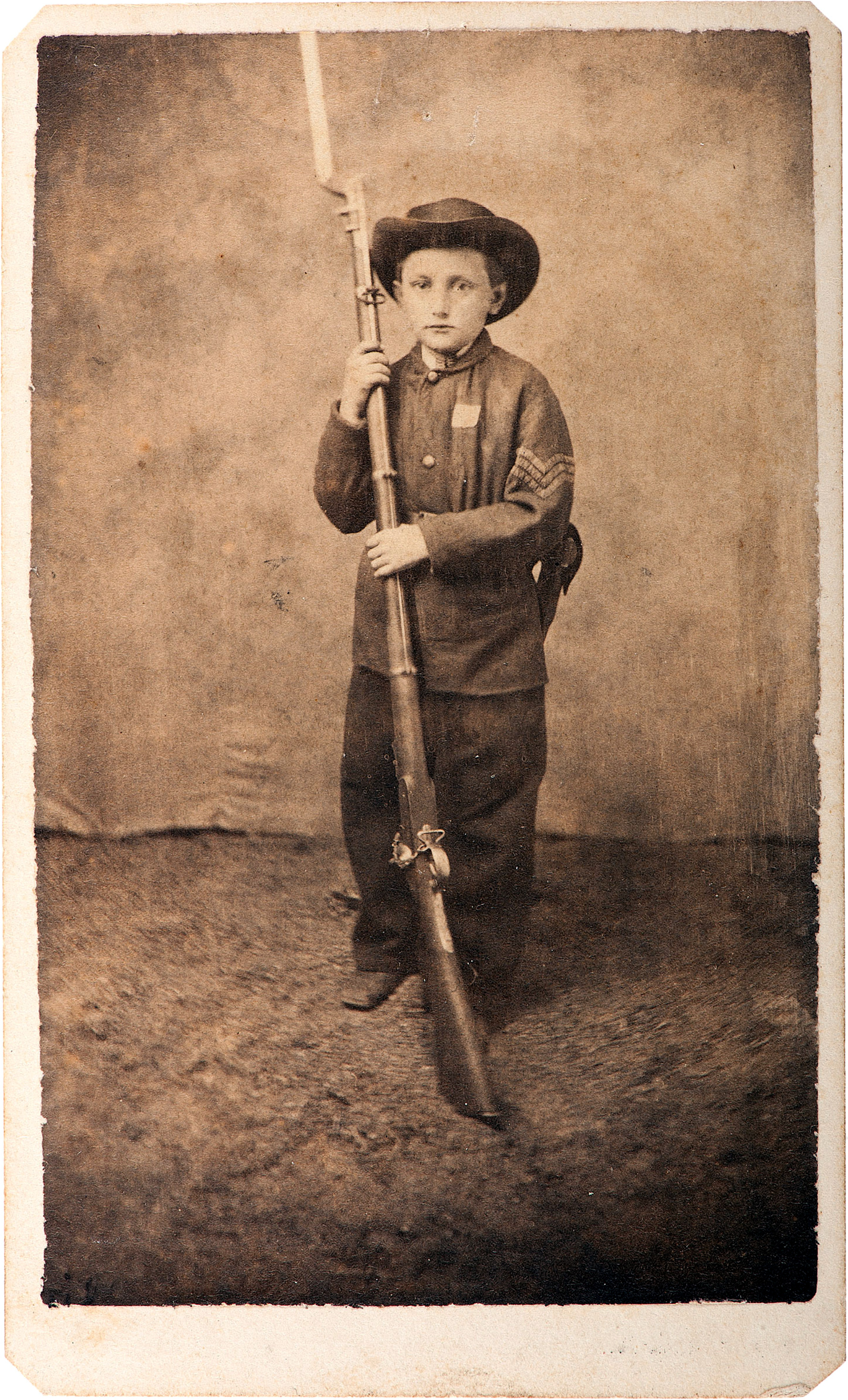
John Clem

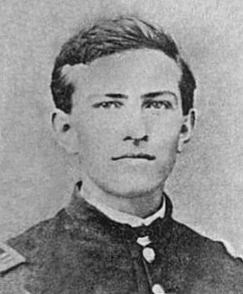
Joseph Foraker as a captain in the Union Army

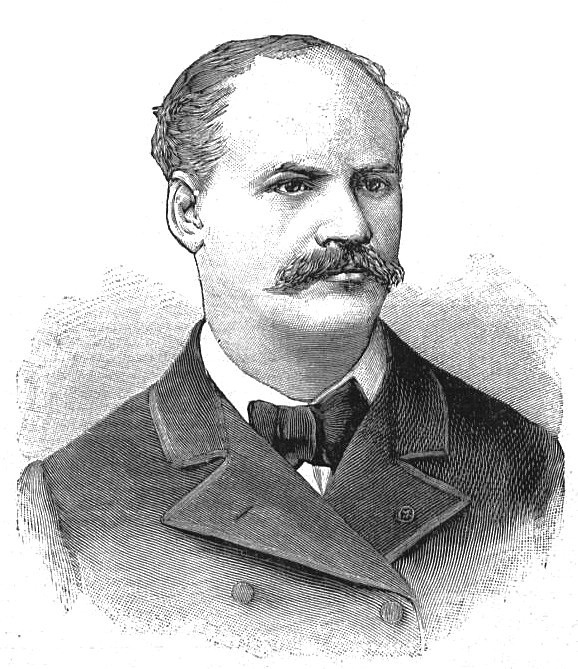
Lt Cornélius Herz

Paul Vandervoort

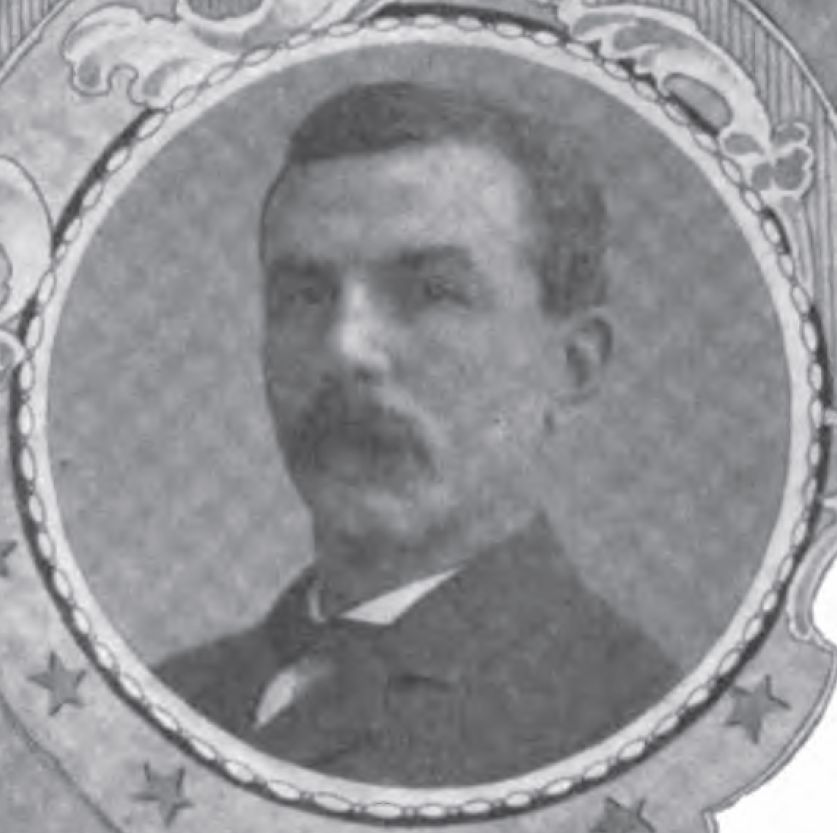
John S Kountz

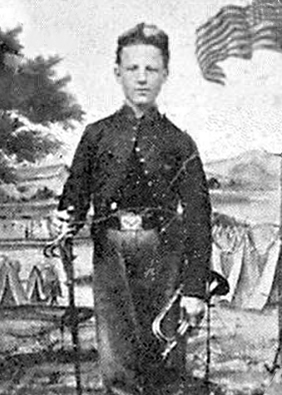
John Cook [bugler]

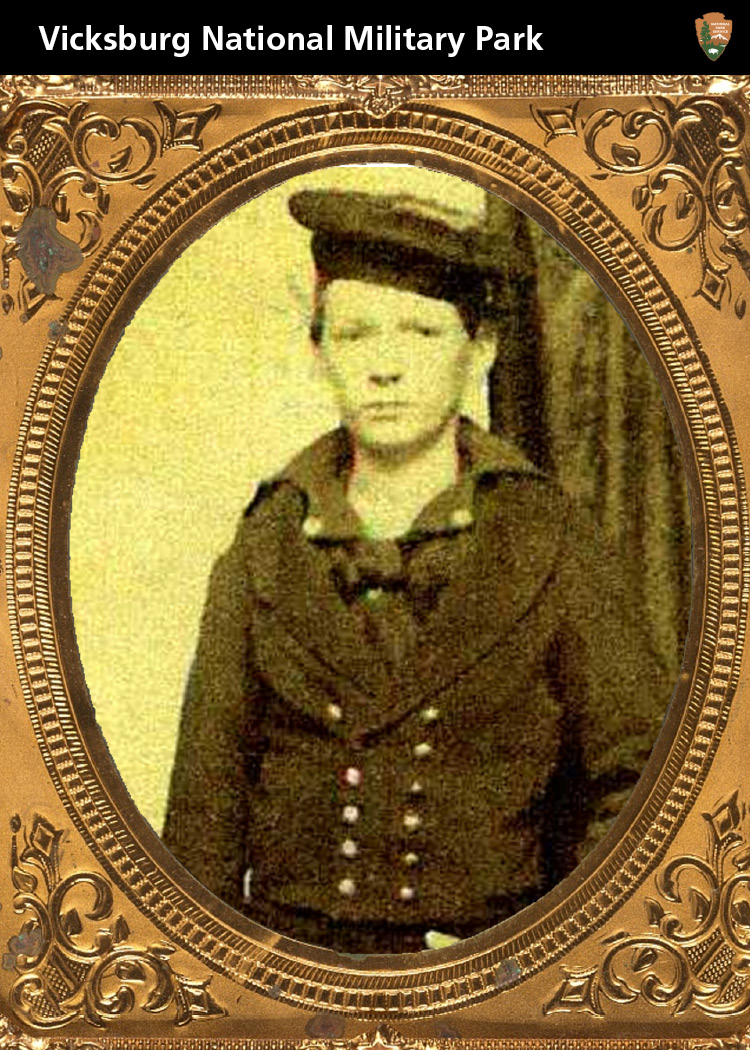
George R. Yost 1st Class Boy US navy

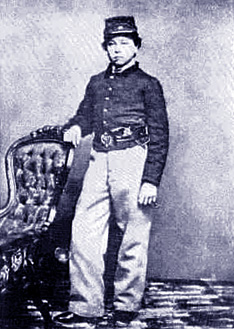
Orion Howe

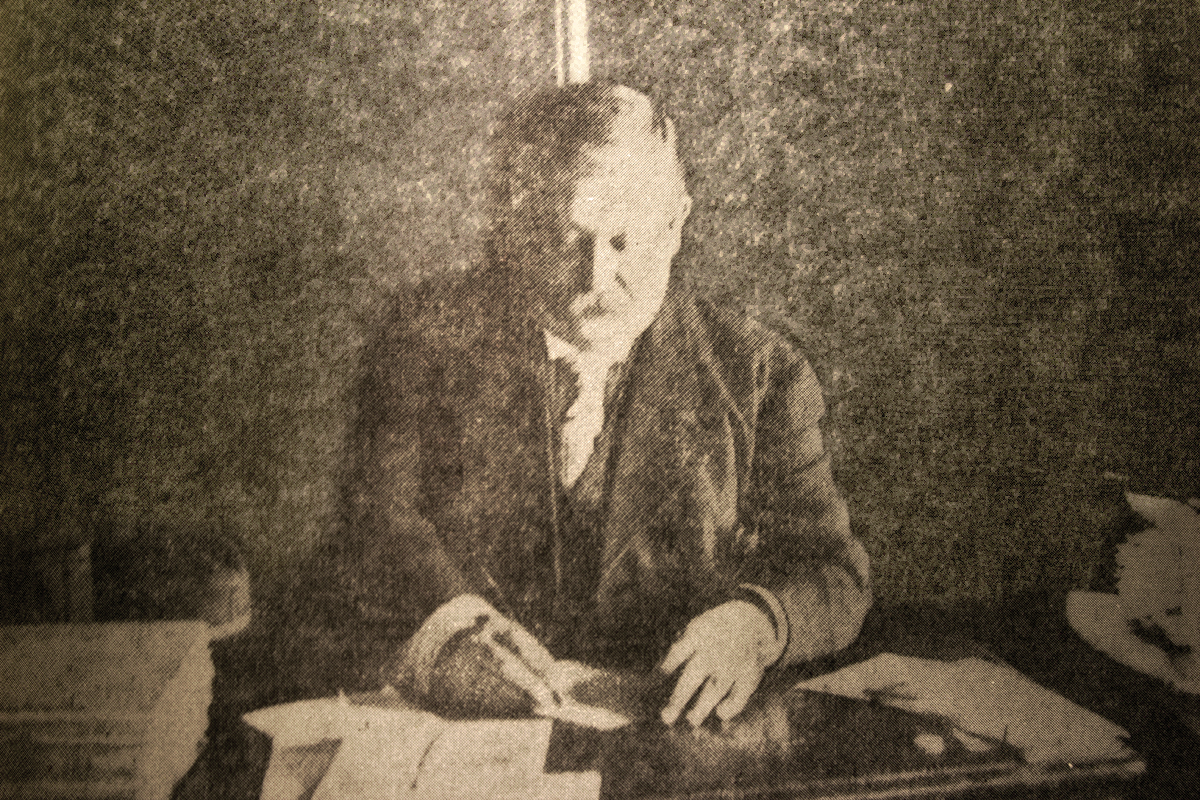
Frederick H Dyer

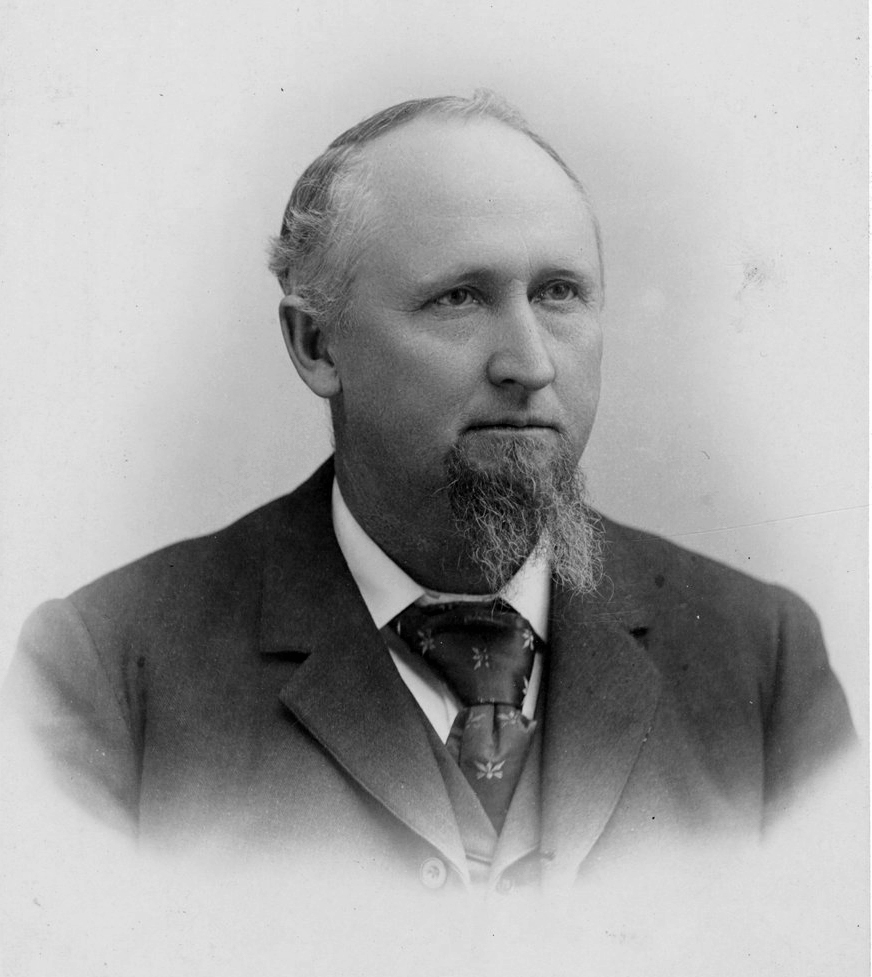
John Whitnah Leedy

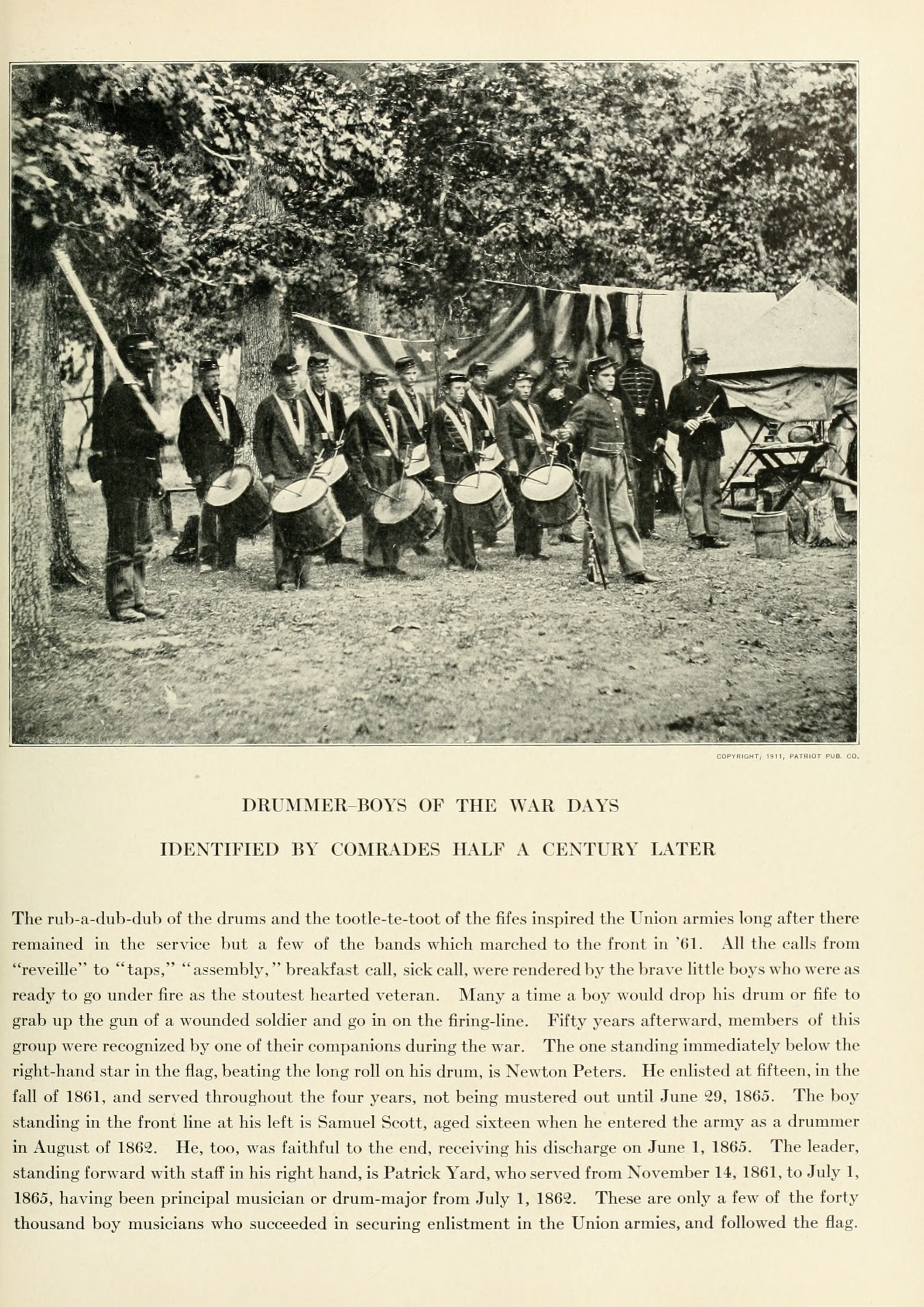
Newton Peters and Samuel Scott in above photograph [Band leader Patrick Yard served 1861–1865]

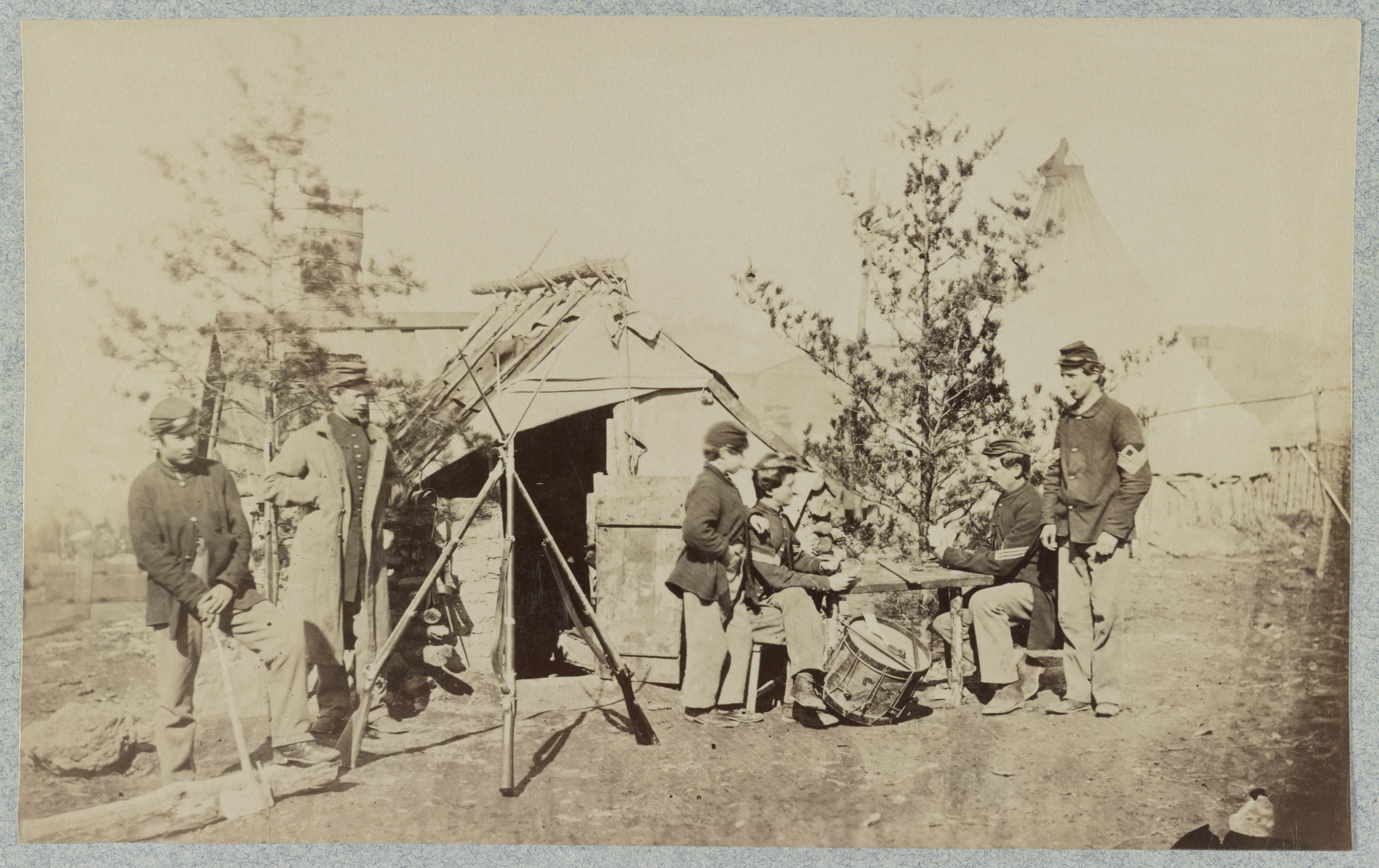
Drummer boys off duty, playing cards in camp, winter of 1862

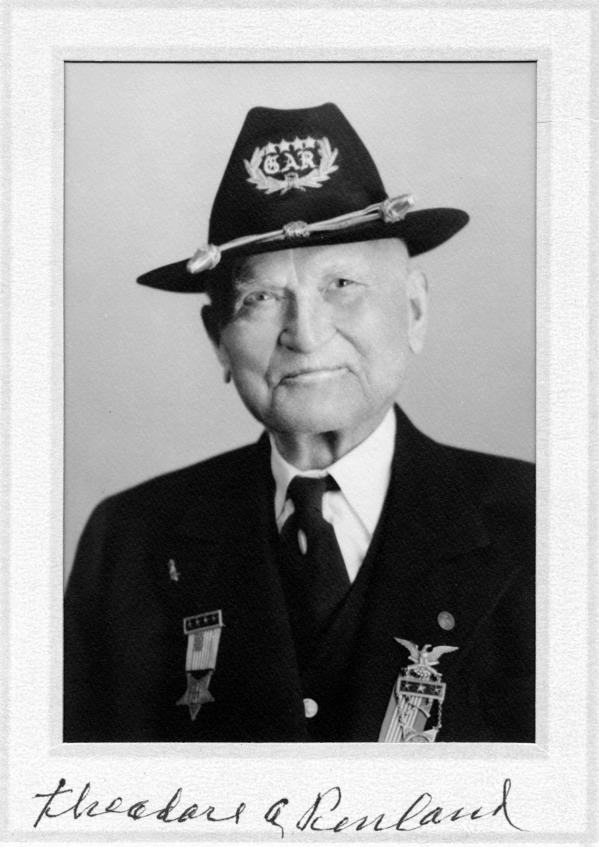
Theodore Penland

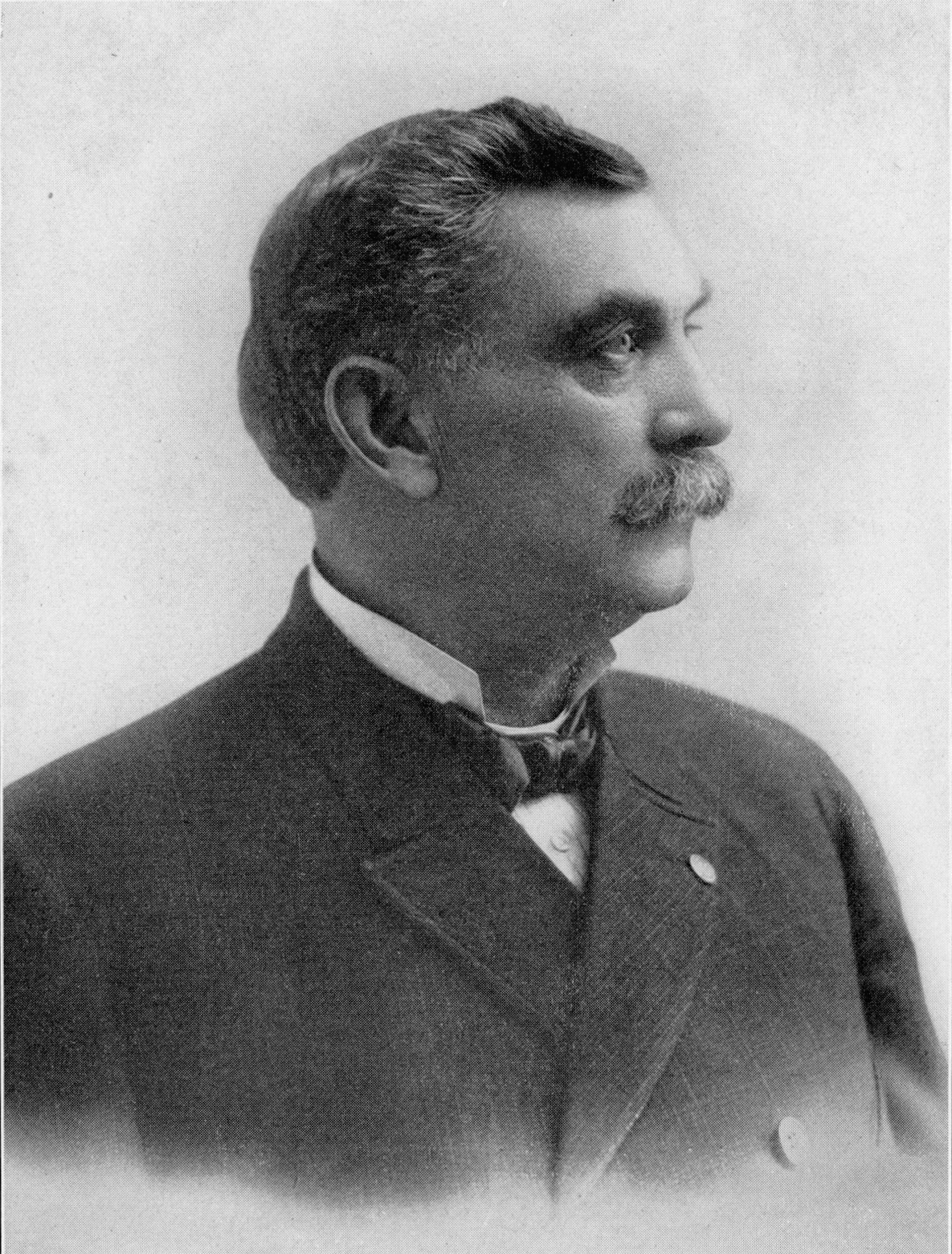
James A. Clough

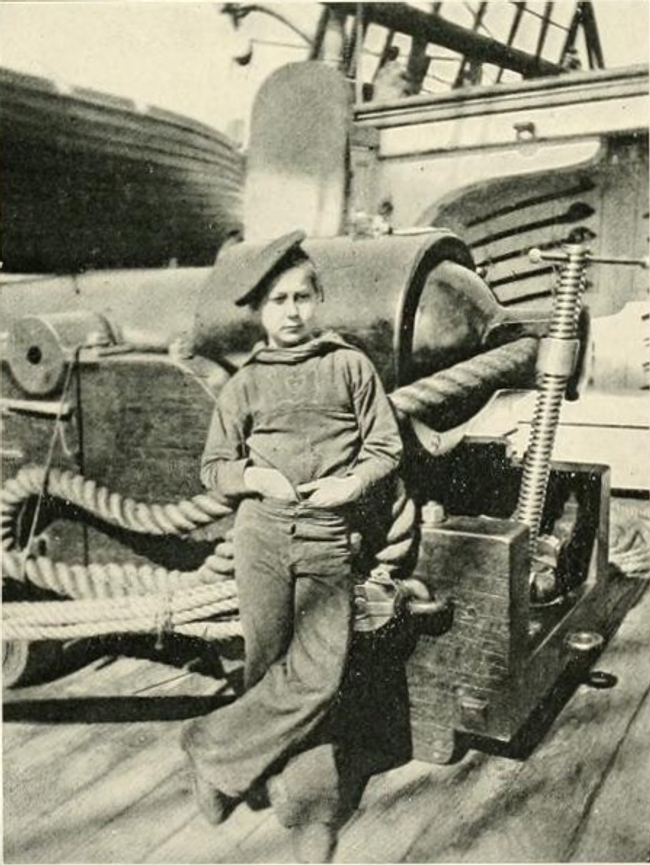
Aspinwall Fuller a powder monkey on the USS Hampshire, circa 1864

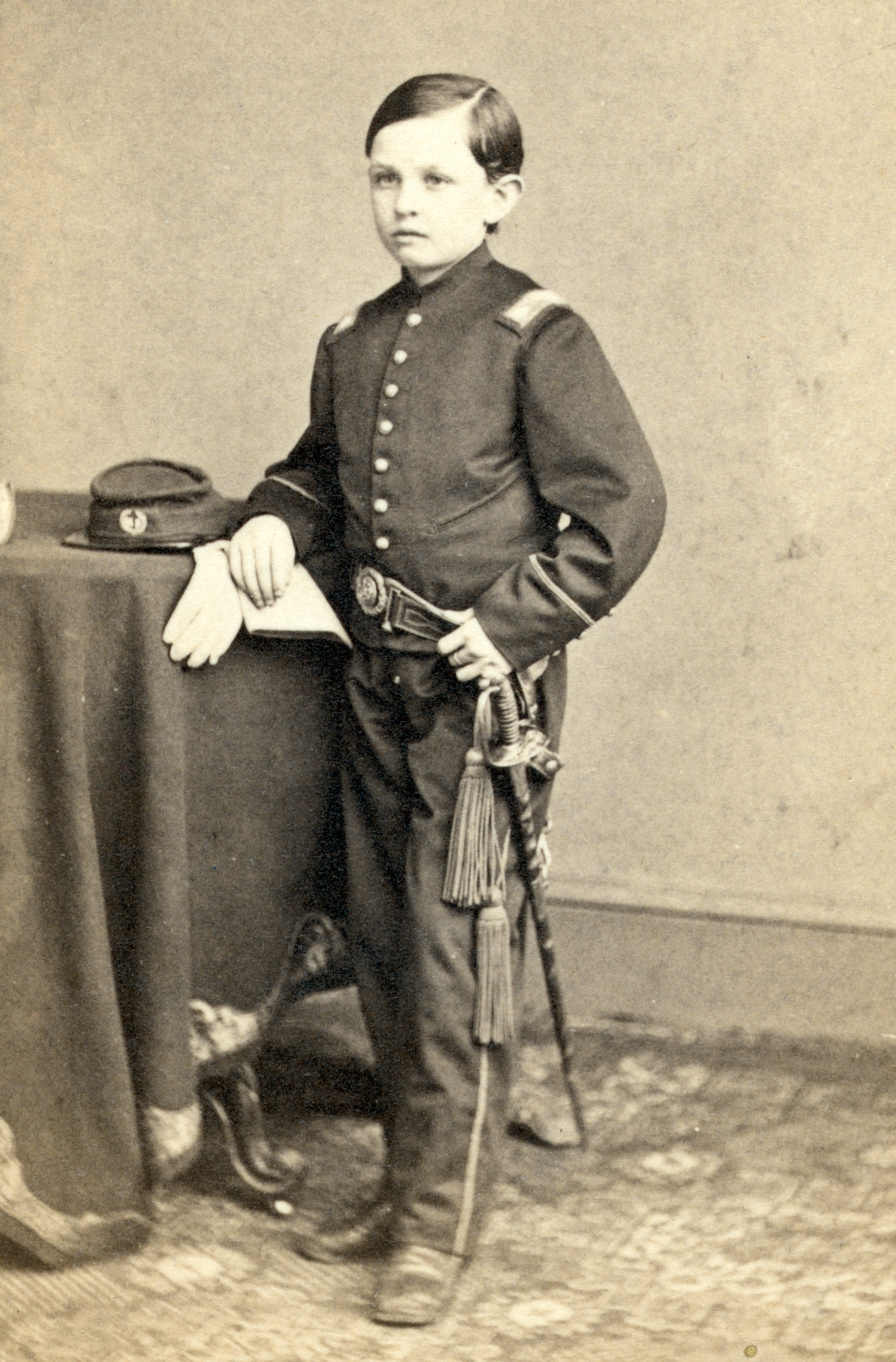
Lt Thomas Lincoln 1864

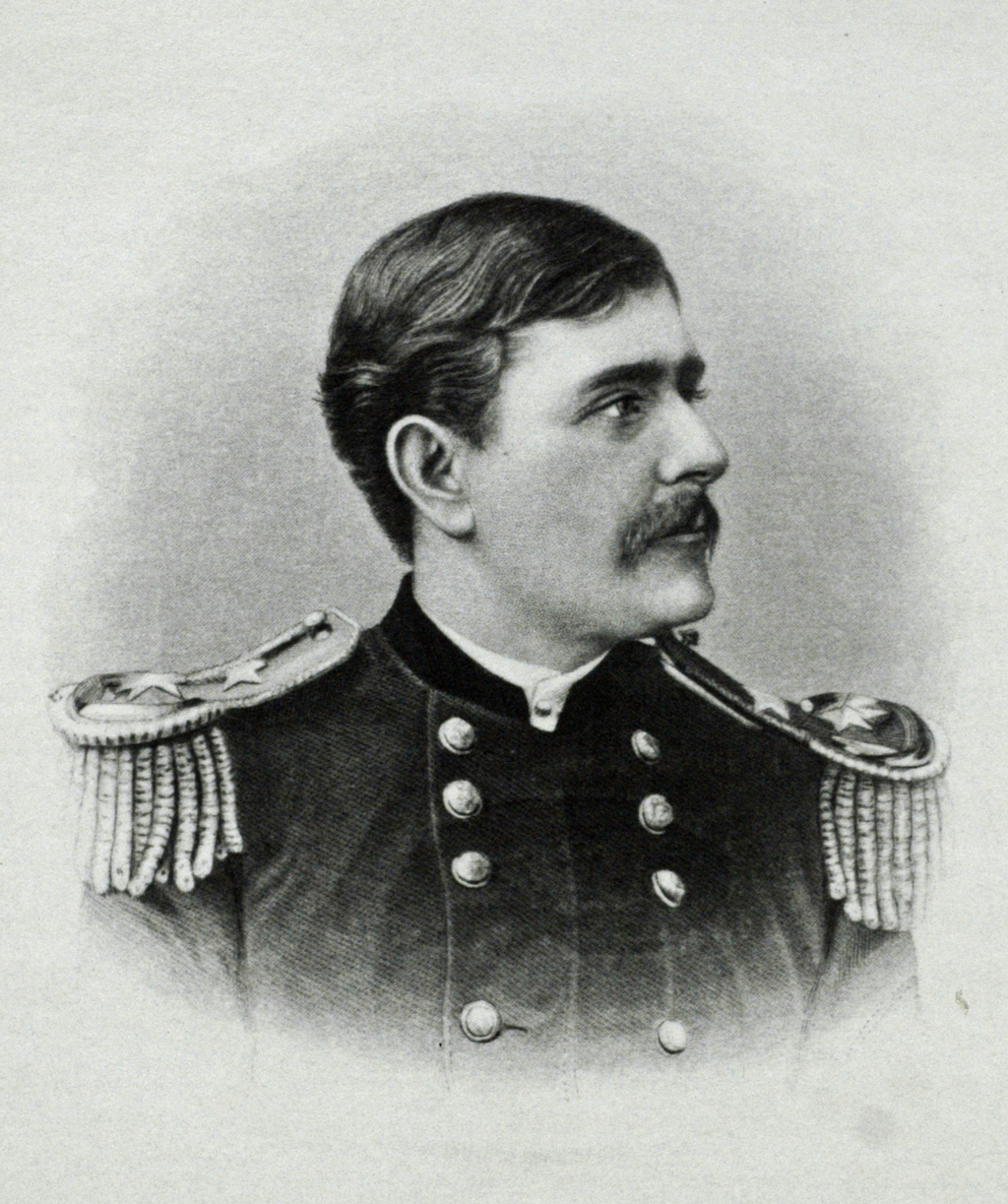
Galusha Pennypacker

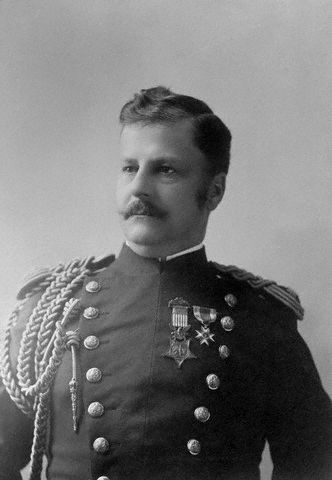
Arthur MacArthur Jr.

William H. H. Hart

=== Confederacy ===
- Benjamin Franklin Williams, Born 1854, Private, Co. I, 3rd Georgia State Troops, Enlisted at the age of 7, served as a wagon driver.
- Glenn Reynolds (sheriff) born 1853, served in Civil War [Texas] against Native Americans
- Charles F Mosby enlisted in 1861 at age 13
- Clell Miller [1849/1850-1876) joined Quantrill raiders at 14; part of James-Younger gang
- James P. Collier age 14 "killed June 1862 at Battle of Seven Pines as substitute for his brother Tip."
- James Morris Morgan was enlisted as a Midshipman 1861 at 15
- Henry Andrew Heck Thomas age 12 served 1862–63
- Dallas Stoudenmire is reported to have enlisted at age 15
- Frank Bowden Childton enlisted 1861 age 16
- Edwin Francis Jemison enlisted in 1861 at age 16; he was killed in 1862 at the Battle of Malvern Hill
- Isidor Strauss (b. 1845) In 1861 he was elected an officer in a Georgia Military unit
- John A Wyeth enlisted in 1861 at age 16
- Sgt William Thomas Biedler 16 years old, of Company C, Mosby's Virginia Cavalry Regiment with flintlock musket
- Allan C. Redwood (b.1844) served 55th Virginia Infantry
- Walter Mackenzie Clark born 1846 in 1861 at age 14 was Lt 22nd N.C; 1862 Adjutant 35th N.C.; 1864 Major 6th N.C. Battalion; 1865 Lt. Col. 70th N.C. age 17
- Jesse James went to war at age 16 in 1863
- Sumner Archibald Cunningham Born 1843 served 1861–1864
- Francis Marion Gibson (1847–1939) enlisted at age 15 and served 2 years and several months
- John F Brown enlisted in 1861 at age 17 Co G Lamar Rifles 11th Mississippi Rifles
- Marcellus Jerome Clarke Enlisted at age 17 in 1861
- Henry Howe Cook promoted to Lt age 17 in 1861
- Texas Jack Omohundro Born 1846 went to war age 17
- J.C Goolsby enlisted at 14 years old, served in Crenshaw Battery part of William Pegram's Battalion of Artillery
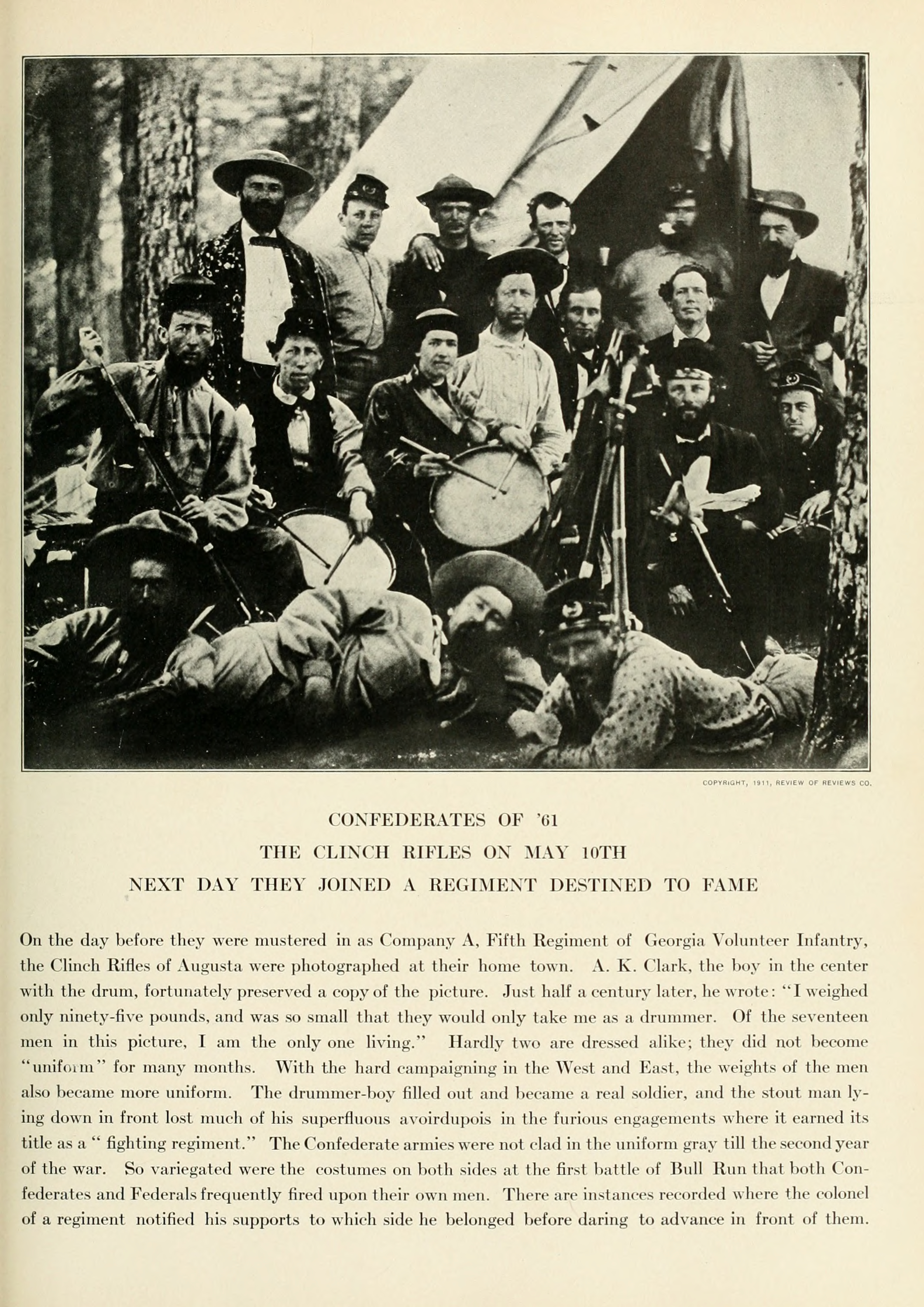
Drummer A.K. Clark [center with drum] "Clinch Rifles" Georgia May 1861

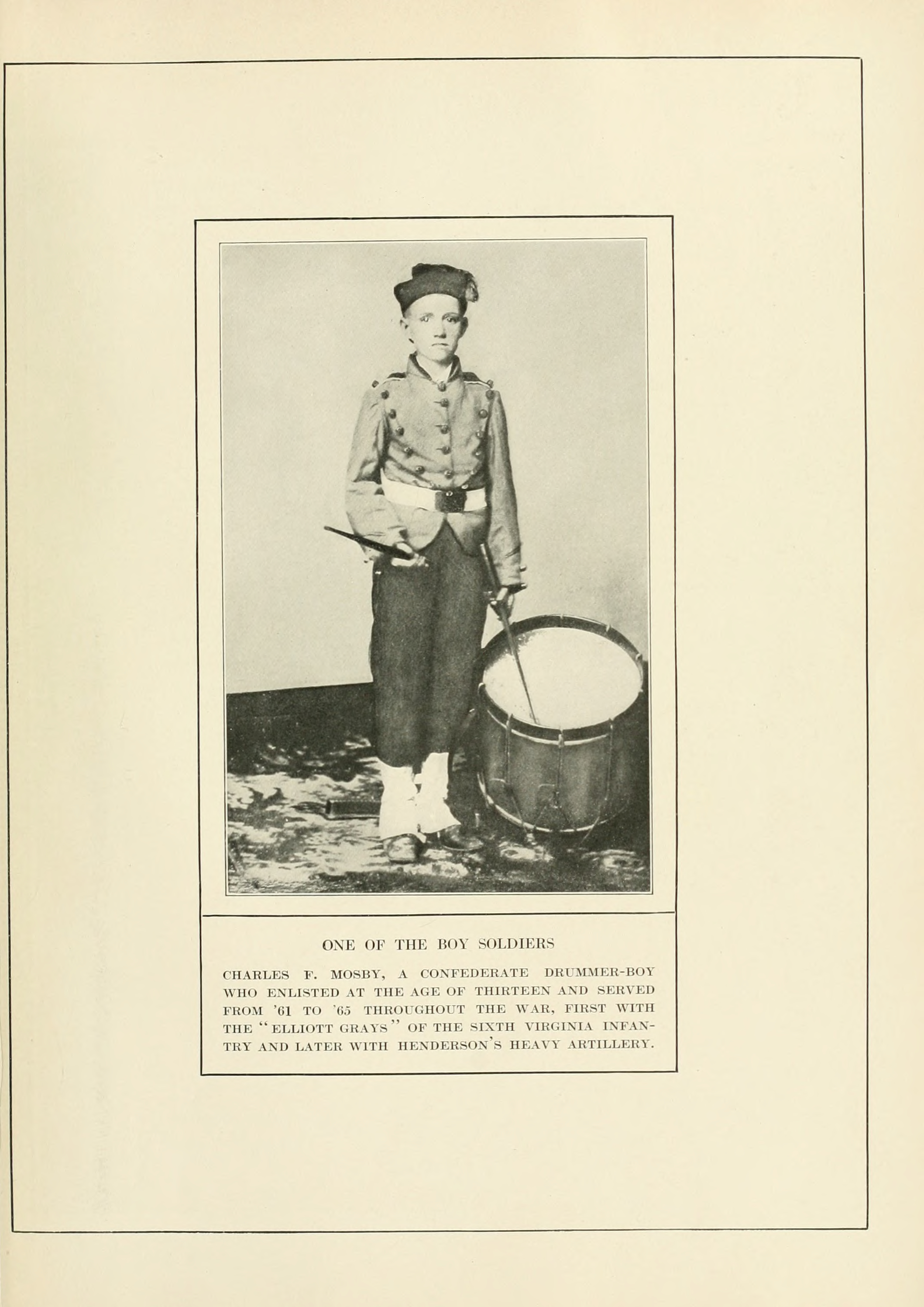
Drummer Charles F Mosby

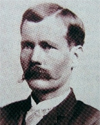
Glenn Reynolds

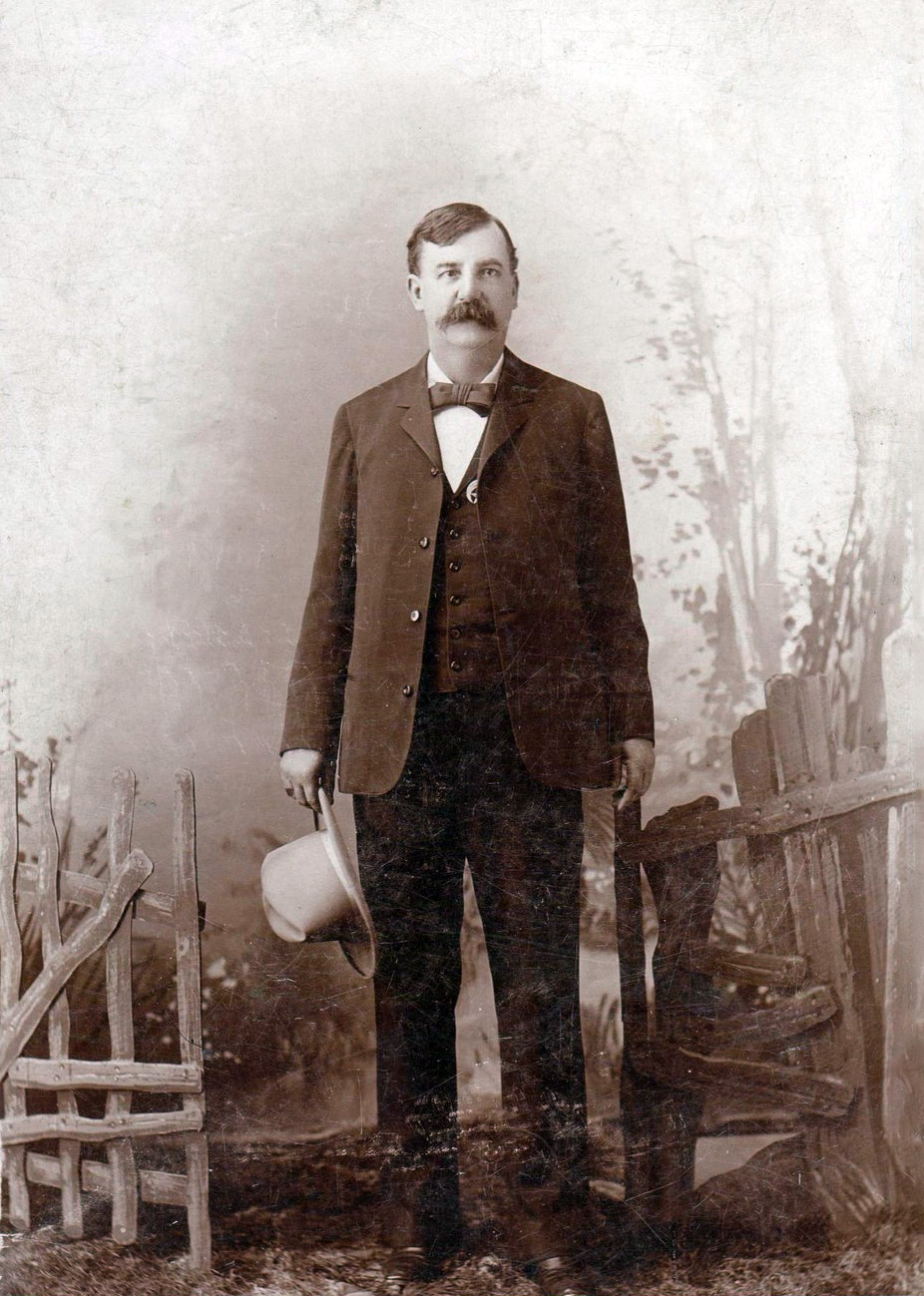
Henry Andrew "Heck" Thomas

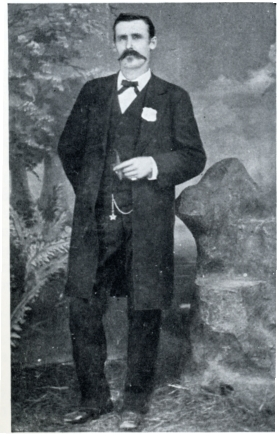
Dallas Stoudenmire

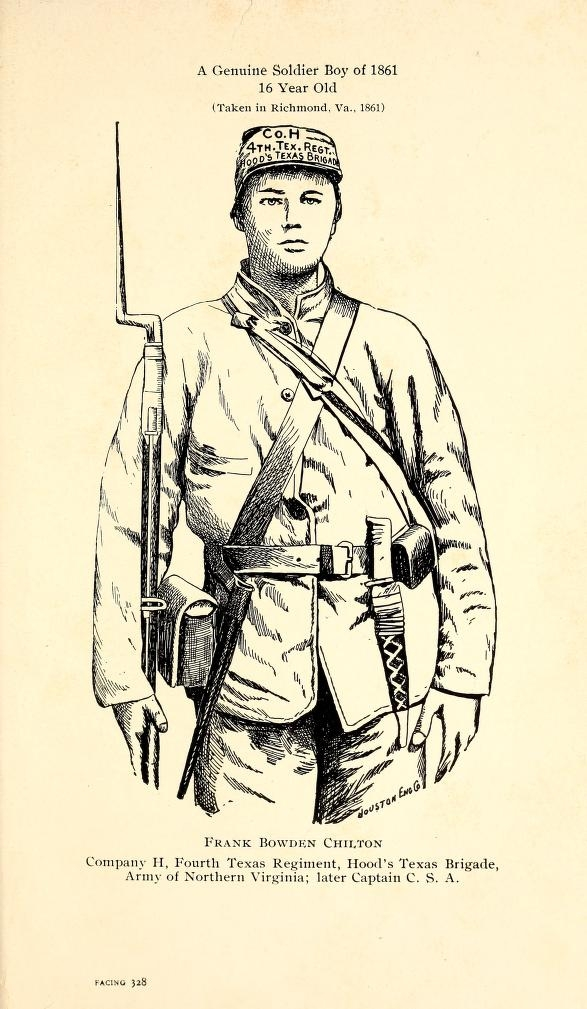
Frank Bowden Chilton, Company H, 4th Texas Infantry, Hood's Texas Brigade in 1861 age 16

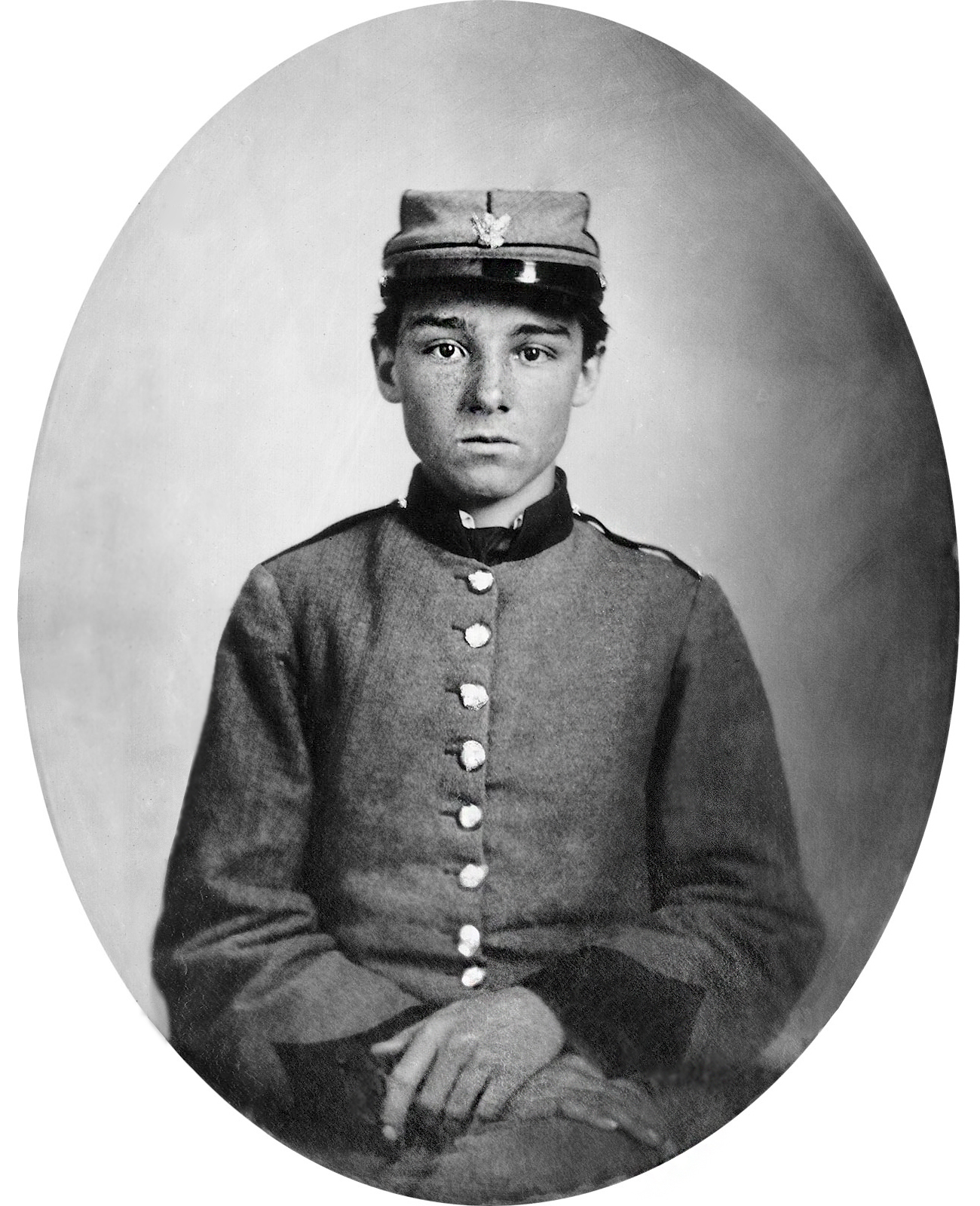
Edwin Francis Jemison

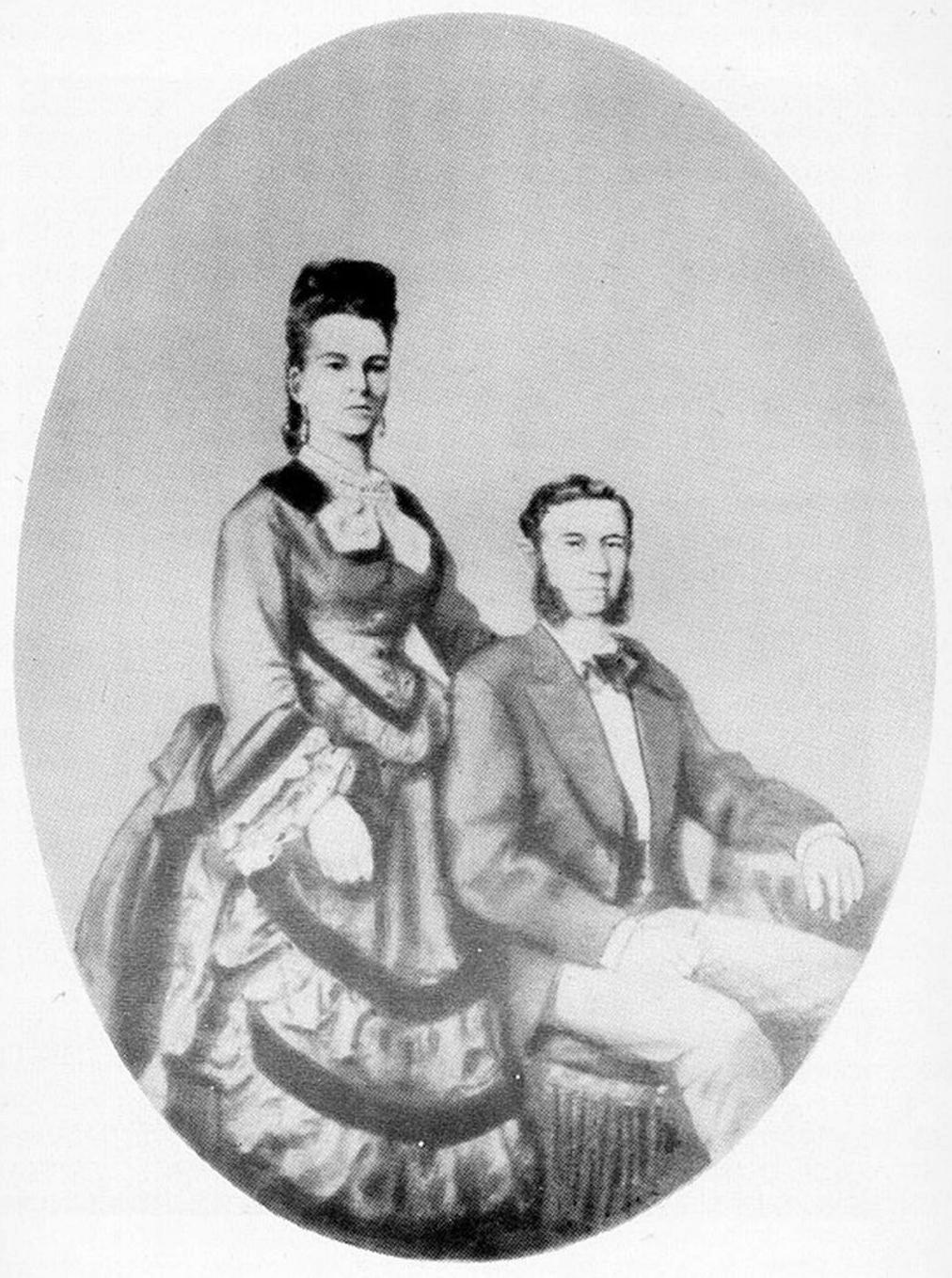
Isidor Straus and wife

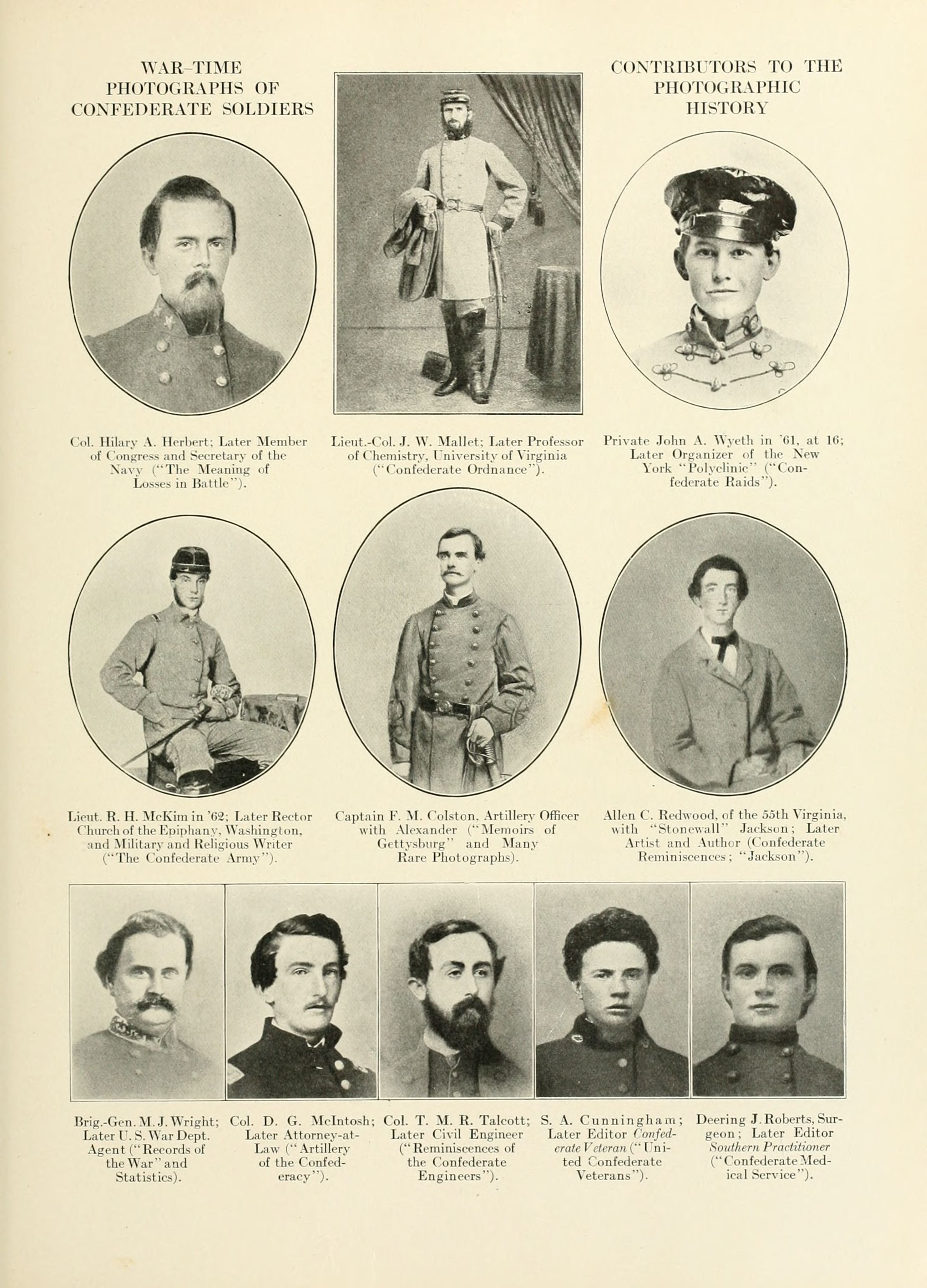
John A Wyeth [upper right hand corner];Allan C Redwood [far right middle row]; Sumner Archibald Cunningham is 2nd from right bottom row

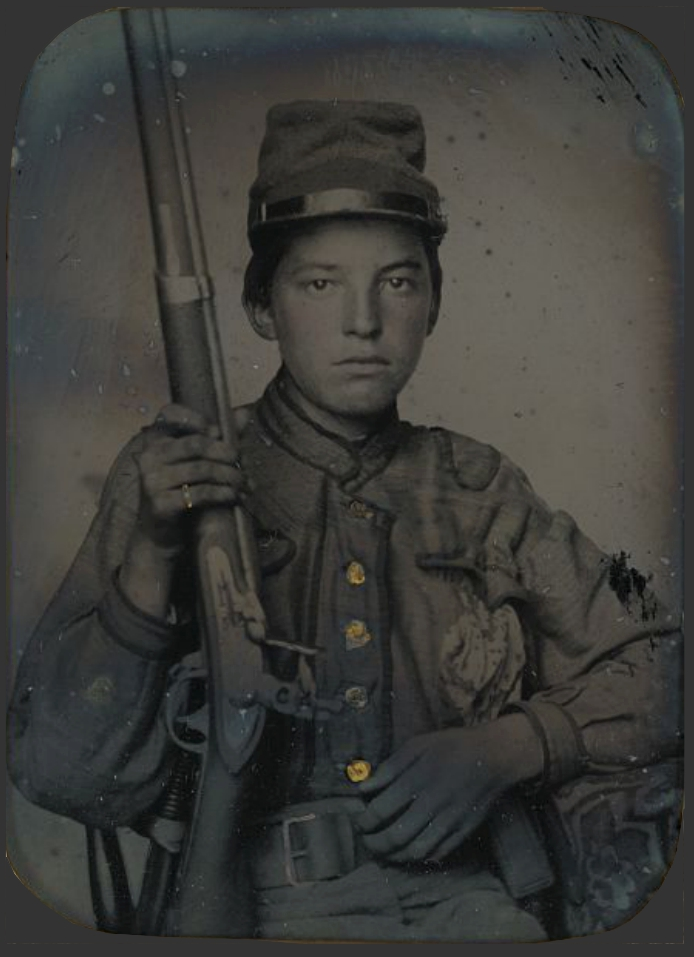
Sgt William T. Biedler

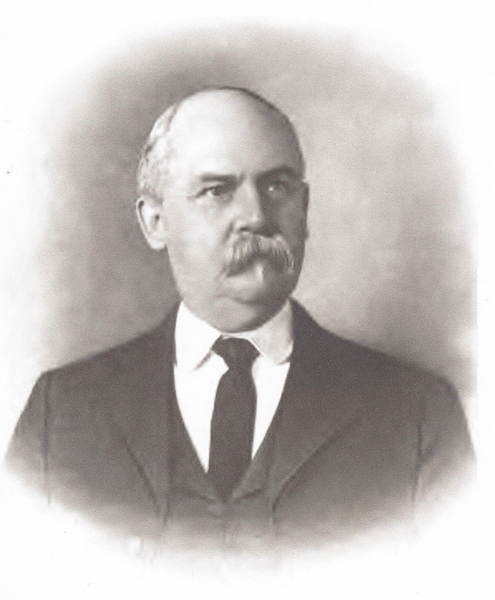
Walter Mackenzie Clark

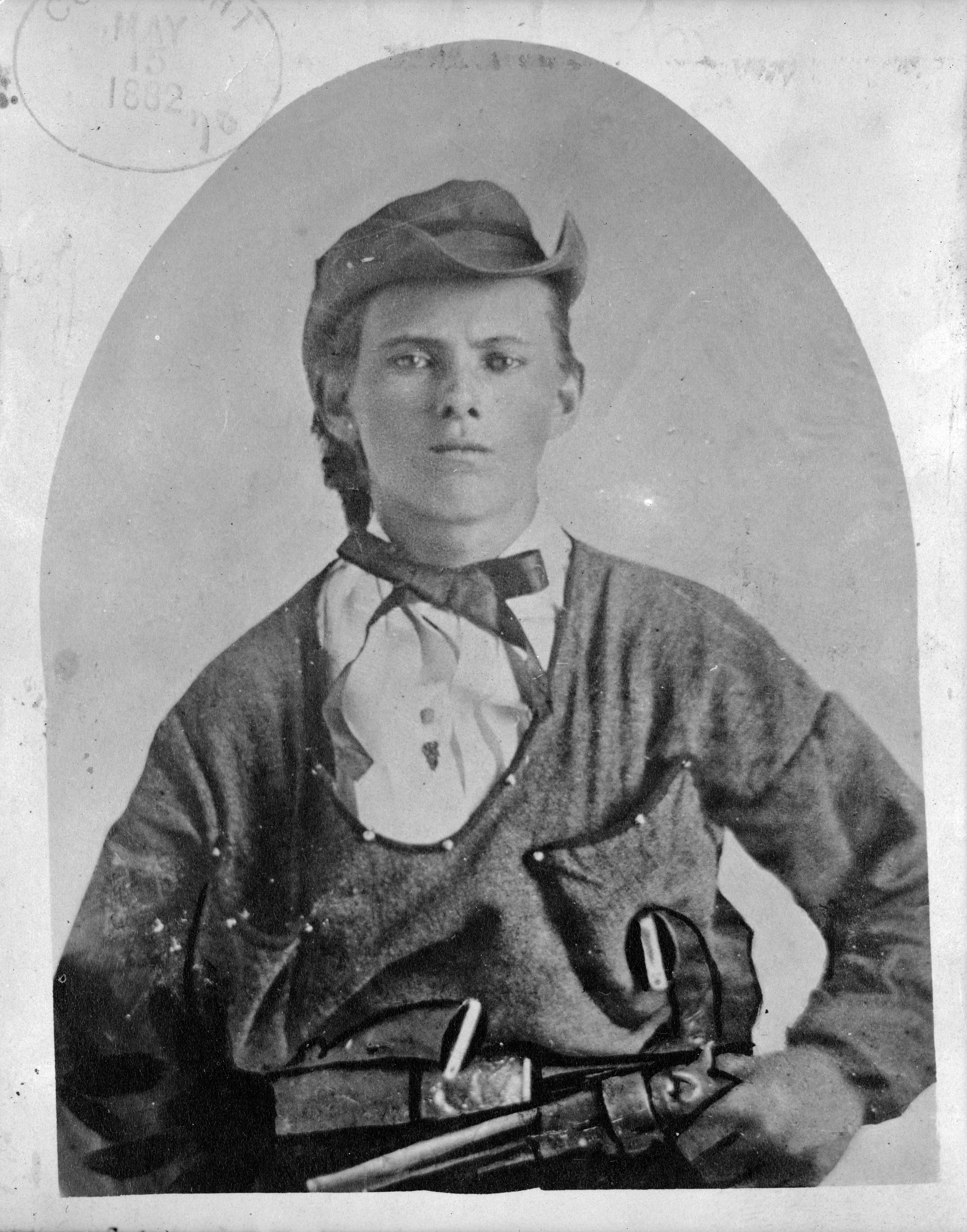
Jesse James 1863

Marcellus Jerome Clarke

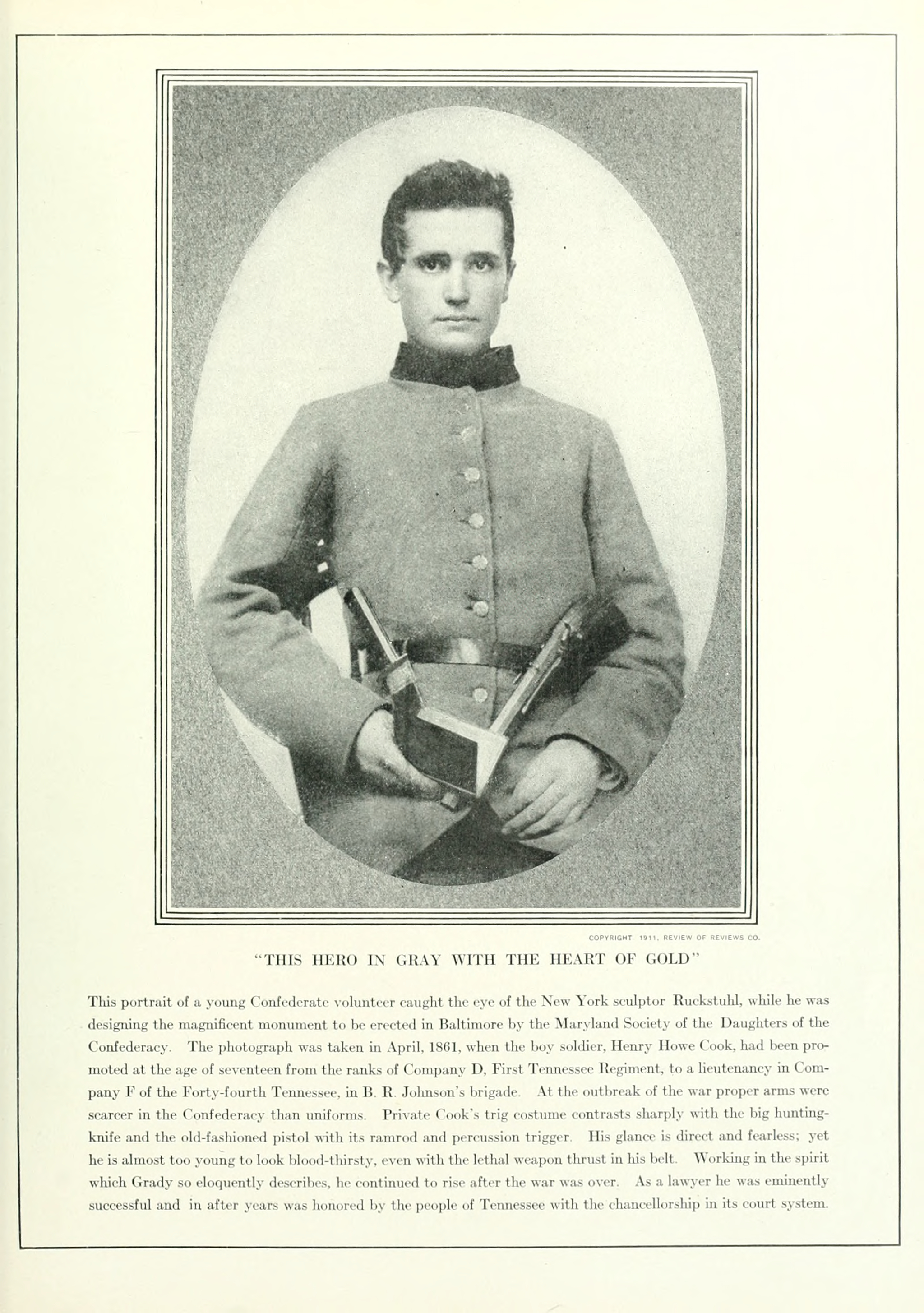
Henry Howe Cook

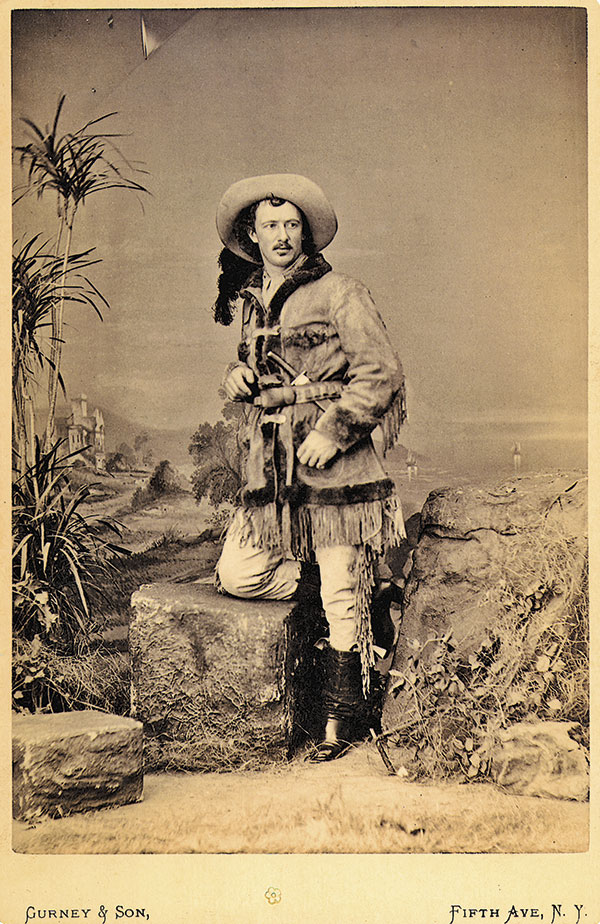
Texas Jack Omohundro

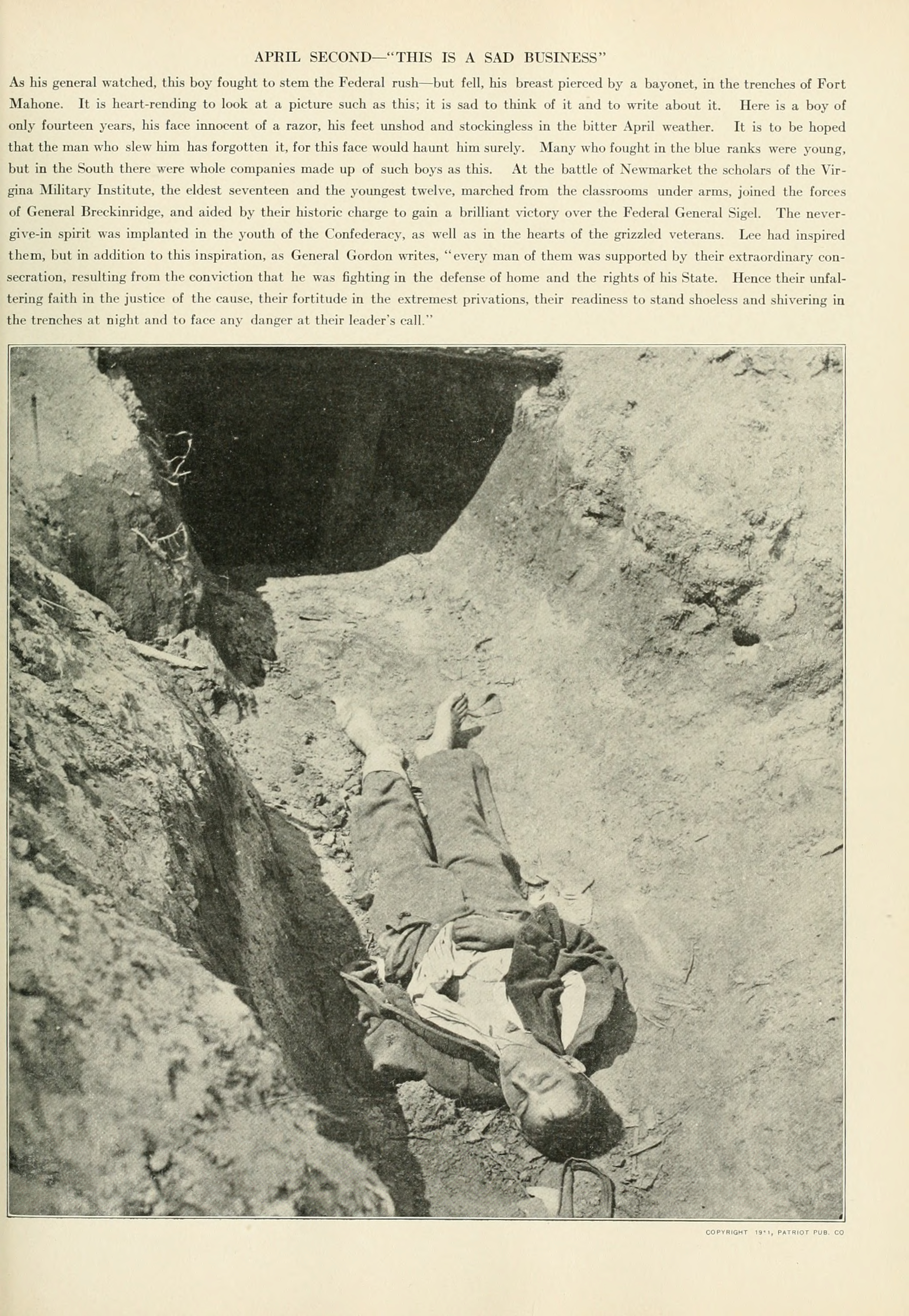
Unknown Confederate soldier estimated at being 14 years of age killed at Petersburg, Virginia, April 2, 1865

== Statistics ==
Federal Soldiers:

- 2,000,000+ were 21 or younger
- 1,000,000 were 18 or younger
- 500,000+ were seventeen or under
- 200,000 were sixteen or under
- 100,000 were fifteen or under
- 10,000 were fourteen or under
- 300 were thirteen or under—most of these were fifers or drummers, but regularly enrolled, and sometimes fighters. Twenty-five were ten or under.

Compared to the number of older men:

- 50,000 were 25 or older
- 15,000 up to the age of 44
- 1,000 were born in the 18th century
