= Peter Anderson (soldier) =

Peter T Anderson
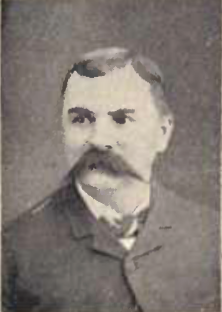
- Born: July 4, 1847; Darlington, Territory of Wisconsin, U.S.
- Died: July 25, 1907 (aged 60); Newell, Iowa, U.S.
- Burial place: Newell Cemetery, Newell, Iowa
- Military career
- Allegiance: United States; Union
- Branch: United States Army; Union Army
- Service years: 1863 - 1865
- Rank: Corporal; Brevet Captain
- Unit: 31st Regiment Wisconsin Volunteer Infantry
- Conflicts: American Civil War; Battle of Bentonville
- Awards: Medal of Honor

Peter T. Anderson (July 4, 1847 – July 25, 1907) served in the Union Army during the American Civil War. He received the Medal of Honor for his actions during the Battle of Bentonville.

Anderson was born July 4, 1847, in Lafayette County, Wisconsin. He enlisted in the 31st Wisconsin Volunteer Infantry in September 1863 and was mustered out in July 1865. He received a brevet promotion to captain two years later. He died July 25, 1907, and was buried in Newell Cemetery, Newell, Iowa.

== Medal of Honor citation ==
His award citation reads:

For extraordinary heroism on 19 March 1865, while serving with Company B, 31st Wisconsin Infantry, in action at Bentonville, North Carolina. Entirely unassisted, Private Anderson brought from the field an abandoned piece of artillery and saved the gun from falling into the hands of the enemy.

== See also ==
- List of American Civil War Medal of Honor recipients
