= 31st Wisconsin Infantry Regiment =

Union Army infantry regiment

- Flag of Wisconsin
- Active: December 24, 1862 – July 8, 1865
- Country: United States
- Allegiance: Union
- Branch: Infantry
- Size: Regiment
- Engagements: American Civil War: Atlanta campaign; Savannah Campaign; Carolinas Campaign; Battle of Averasborough; Battle of Bentonville

Commanders
- Colonel: Isaac E. Messmore
- Colonel: Francis H. West

The 31st Wisconsin Infantry Regiment was a volunteer infantry regiment that served in the Union Army during the American Civil War. They served in the western theater of the war, participating in the Atlanta Campaign, Sherman's March to the Sea (Savannah Campaign), and the Carolinas Campaign.

== Service ==
The 31st Wisconsin Infantry was raised as two battalions beginning in September 1862. The first battalion was organized at Prairie du Chien, comprising companies A, B, C, D, E, and F; they were mustered into federal service under a special order of the War Department on October 9, 1862, to guard Confederate prisoners of war in Wisconsin. The second battalion, consisting of companies G, H, I, and K, was raised at Camp Utley in Racine, Wisconsin. Companies A, D, and F were ordered to Camp Randall on November 14, at the same time, companies B, C, and E, and the incomplete companies G, H, I, and K, were set on temporary duty to guard the draft operations in southeast Wisconsin after recent draft riots. On December 20, the companies were reassembled at Racine; they mustered into federal service as the 31st Wisconsin Infantry Regiment on December 24, 1862.

Companies A–F were mustered out on June 20, 1865. Companies G–K followed on July 8, 1865.

== Commanders ==
- Colonel Isaac E. Messmore (August 28, 1862 – October 2, 1863) resigned. Before the war he was a Wisconsin legislator and judge.
- Colonel Francis H. West (October 8, 1863 – June 20, 1865) was originally lieutenant colonel of the regiment. He received an honorary brevet to brigadier general. Before the war he served in the Wisconsin State Senate, after the war, he served in the Assembly and was appointed U.S. marshal for the Eastern District of Wisconsin.

== Total enlistments and casualties ==
The 31st Wisconsin suffered 23 enlisted men killed in action or who later died of their wounds, plus another 3 officers and 86 enlisted men who died of disease, for a total of 112 fatalities.

31st Wisconsin Infantry, Company Organization
Company	Captain(s)
A	Henry A. Chase (mustered out)
B	Robert B. Stephenson (promoted); Nathaniel B. Treat (mustered out)
C	Ira D. Burdick (resigned); William Williamson (mustered out)
D	Ormsby B. Thomas (resigned); Nathaniel C. Denio (mustered out)
E	James B. Mason (died–disease); Daniel B. Dipple (mustered out)
F	Charles W. Burns (mustered out)
G	George D. Rogers (promoted); Farlin Q. Ball (mustered out)
H	Edward K. Buttrick (detailed); Byron Hewitt (mustered out)
I	John B. Vliet (POW); Martin C. Short (mustered out)
K	Edwin Augustus Bottum (resigned); George R. Peck (mustered out)

== Notable people ==
- Peter Anderson, corporal in Co. B, died at the Battle of Bentonville and received the Medal of Honor for his actions; also granted a posthumous brevet to captain.
- Alfred Brunson served one year as chaplain of the regiment.
- William Henry Evans, private in Co. D, later served as a Wisconsin state legislator.
- William J. Gibson, major, died of disease. Before the war, he had served as a Wisconsin state senator.
- Joseph Francis Goss, private in Co. I, was the youngest combatant soldier enlisted in the Union Army during the war, having enlisted in the regiment at age 14.
- Alanson Graves, father of W. R. Graves, was enlisted in Co. D, then promoted to sergeant in Co. K.
- Ormsby B. Thomas, captain of Co. D, later served in the U.S. House of Representatives.
- Nathaniel B. Treat, captain of Co. B, later served as a Wisconsin state legislator.

== See also ==
- List of Wisconsin Civil War units
- Wisconsin in the American Civil War
