= Joseph Francis Goss =

Private Joseph Francis Goss
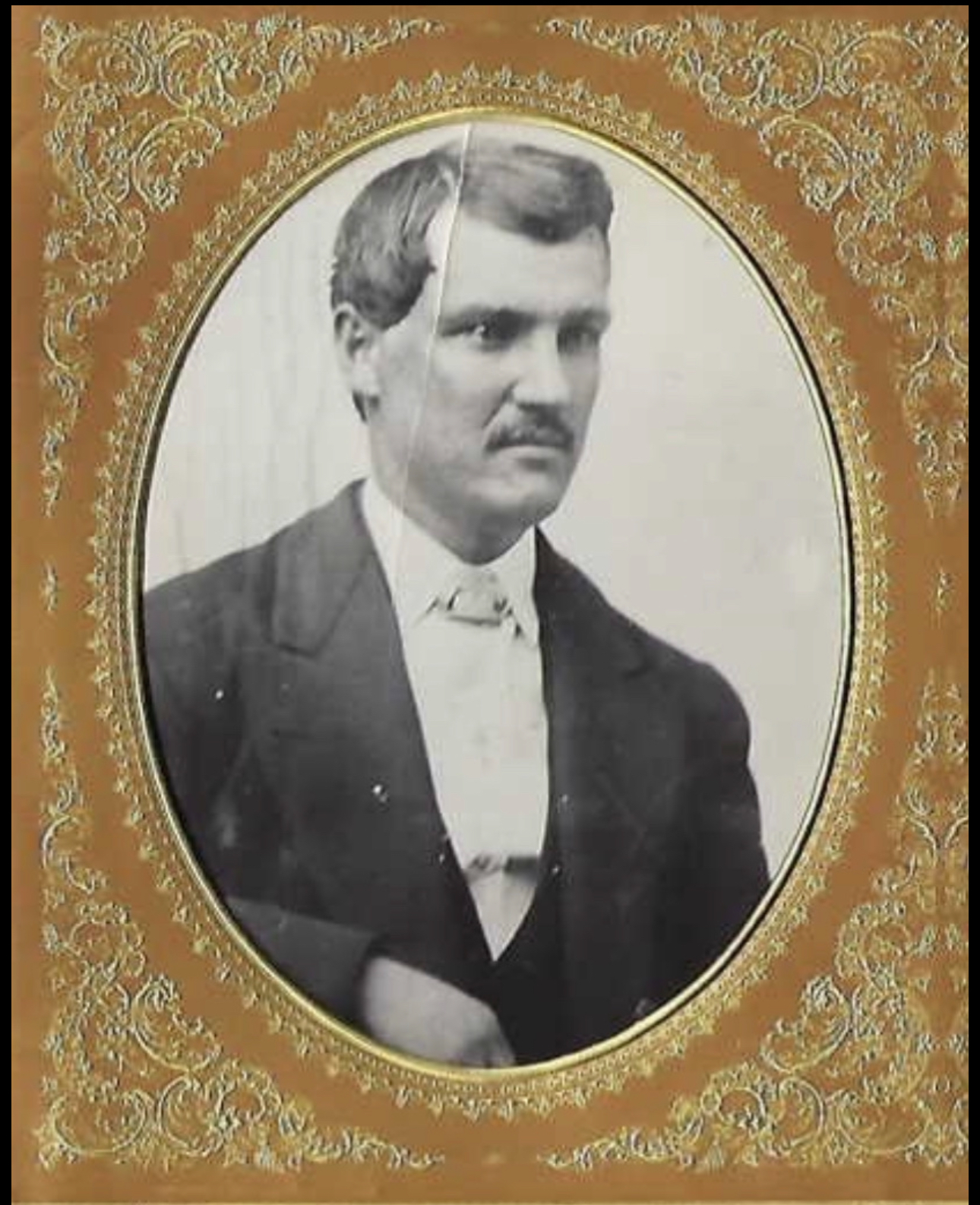
- Portrait of Goss c. 1875
- Born: June 15, 1848; Sterling, Massachusetts, U.S.
- Died: December 3, 1918 (aged 70); Milwaukee, Wisconsin, U.S.
- Burial place: Wood National Cemetery
- Years active: 1861–1865
- Known for: Youngest combat soldier in the American Civil War

Joseph Francis Goss (June 15, 1848 – December 3, 1918) was the youngest combatant soldier in the American Civil War, serving in the 31st Wisconsin Infantry Regiment. He joined the service in December 1862, at the age of 14 years and 8 months. He participated in the Siege of Atlanta, the Siege of Savannah, and Sherman's March to the Sea.

== Life ==
=== Early life ===
Joseph Francis Goss was born in June 1848 to Michael Goss and Mary Rice in Sterling, Worcester County, Massachusetts. His parents had immigrated from Dundalk, County Louth, Ireland, after marrying in 1840. His brother Edward was born in 1847 in County Louth, Ireland.

Shortly after Joseph's birth, the Goss family moved West, with Joseph's family stopping in Milwaukee, Wisconsin. His grandparents and uncle continued west, with his uncle Stephen Goss stopping Texas, who later fought against his nephew Joseph Francis in the Civil War. His grandparents continued west and settled in Sacramento, California.

His brother, Thomas, was born June 5, 1855 in Madison, Wisconsin.

=== Civil War ===
When the Civil War began, Joseph's father enlisted at the age of 60, but did not see the front lines due to having no teeth, therefore being unable to eat hardtack. He was mustered into the 32nd Wisconsin Regiment, but never saw combat.

At 13 years old, Goss was enlisted as an “aide-de-camp”, a confidant to Colonel Reynolds, a neighbor and close friend to the Goss’s. Joseph was put into the army after he had disrespected Colonel Reynolds, by telling him to “Go to hell”, therefore having the Colonel tell his father “Not a man nor a soldier would dare say such a thing to such a high-ranking officer.” Joseph would be mustered in, the Colonel told his father. Joseph, at the age of 14 years and 8 months, was mustered in to the 31st Wisconsin Regiment, as a private in Company I, Unit 3084. Joseph Goss had always wanted to be in the army, and used disrespect as an avenue in, rather than plainly enlisting. He was then transferred to the general control of George McClellan, Commander-in-chief of the North.

He fought in the battles of Chickamauga, Chattanooga, Lookout Mountain, and Chancellorsville. Here he was transferred under the command of General Ulysses S. Grant, who was in charge of what was known as "War of the West". General Sherman was recruiting his army at that time and Joseph was chosen as one of the soldiers to make up General Sherman's regiment on his famous "March to the Sea". He served under General Sherman until the close of the war. He was mustered out of service in December 1865, without any wounds. In 1898, the United States Congress voted him a gold medal, honorably discharged with outstanding bravery and ability. The medal was presented at a G.A.R meeting. His son sang “Just As the Sun Went Down” .He in the end was the youngest soldier to have enlisted into the army and to serve as a combatant soldier.

=== Post-Civil War ===
After Joseph was mustered out of the military in December 1865, his father had started a tobacco farm, and worked well into his 90's, and was credited for the growth of tobacco in Door County. Joseph became a stonecutter and was one till 1914.

Joseph's brother Edward became a priest in 1886 but was paralyzed in 1887, leaving him to be at home for the remainder of his life, which ended in 1895. His parents, Michael and Mary (Rice) Goss lived with him in a lakefront home on Kangaroo Lake. His brother Thomas built the home in the 1830s and was a pioneer settler of Bailey's Harbor, Wisconsin.

In 1905, Joseph's father, Michael, died on December 10, at the age of 106, from old age. His life spanned from 1799 to 1905.

On December 3, 1918, Joseph Francis Goss died at the age of 70 years old.

== Sources ==
- Historical Data Systems, comp. U.S., American Civil War Regiments, 1861-1866. Provo, UT, USA: Ancestry.com Operations Inc, 1999
