= Thorleif A. Peterson =

American farmer and politician

Thorleif Alfred "Tulley" Peterson (Note: Thorleif is the correct spelling of his given name; see Senate Manual Wisconsin, 1935, Lawrence R. Larsen, Chief Clerk of the Wisconsin Senate, Democratic Printing Company, Madison, Wisconsin: 1935, p. 24.) (September 9, 1885 – January 9, 1982) was an American farmer and politician.

Peterson was born in the town of Utica, Crawford County, Wisconsin. He was a farmer and was involved with the cheese, creamery, and insurance businesses. Peterson served on the Utica Town Board and was the chairman of the town board. He also served on the Star Valley School Board. Peterson served in the Wisconsin Assembly from 1933 to 1937 and was a Democrat. He was involved in the good roads movement, and in 1935 he introduced an unsuccessful bill to limit road speeds on Wisconsin highways. In 1958, Peterson moved to Viroqua, Wisconsin. He died in Viroqua, Wisconsin.
