= List of elections in 1872 =

The following elections occurred in the year 1872.

== America ==
=== Canada ===
- 1872 Canadian federal election

=== United States ===
- 1872 New York state election
- 1872 United States elections

==== United States Presidential ====
- 1872 United States presidential election

==== United States Senate ====
- 1872 and 1873 United States Senate elections

==== United States House of Representatives ====
- 1872 United States House of Representatives elections
- United States House of Representatives elections in California, 1872
- United States House of Representatives elections in South Carolina, 1872
- United States House of Representatives elections in Tennessee, 1872

==== United States lieutenant gubernatorial ====
- 1872 Connecticut lieutenant gubernatorial election
- 1872 Illinois lieutenant gubernatorial election
- 1872 Missouri lieutenant gubernatorial election

==== United States gubernatorial ====
- 1872 Alabama gubernatorial election
- 1872 Arkansas gubernatorial election
- 1872 Connecticut gubernatorial election
- 1872 Florida gubernatorial election
- 1872 Georgia gubernatorial election
- 1872 Illinois gubernatorial election
- 1872 Indiana gubernatorial election
- 1872 Kansas gubernatorial election
- 1872 Louisiana gubernatorial election
- 1872 Maine gubernatorial election
- 1872 Massachusetts gubernatorial election
- 1872 Michigan gubernatorial election
- 1872 Missouri gubernatorial election
- 1872 Nebraska gubernatorial election
- 1872 New Hampshire gubernatorial election
- 1872 New York gubernatorial election
- 1872 North Carolina gubernatorial election
- 1872 Pennsylvania gubernatorial election
- 1872 Rhode Island gubernatorial election
- 1872 South Carolina gubernatorial election
- 1872 Vermont gubernatorial election
- 1872 West Virginia gubernatorial election

==== United States mayoral elections ====
- 1872 Boston mayoral election
- 1872 Manchester, New Hampshire mayoral election

=== Colombia ===
- presidential election

== Europe ==
- April 1872 Spanish general election
- August 1872 Spanish general election
- 1872 Belgian general election
- 1872 Danish Folketing election
- 1872 Greek legislative election
- 1872 Hungarian parliamentary election
- 1872 Liechtenstein general election
- 1872 Swedish general election
- 1872 Swiss federal election
- United Kingdom:
  - 1872 Aberdeen by-election
  - 1872 Bedfordshire by-election
  - 1872 Cork City by-election
  - 1872 Flint Boroughs by-election
  - 1872 Flintshire by-election
  - 1872 East Gloucestershire by-election
  - 1872 County Galway by-election
  - 1872 County Kerry by-election
  - 1872 Kincardineshire by-election
  - 1872 Londonderry City by-election
  - 1872 Mallow by-election
  - 1872 North Nottinghamshire by-election
  - 1872 Northern West Riding of Yorkshire by-election
  - 1872 Oldham by-election
  - 1872 Pontefract by-election
  - 1872 Preston by-election
  - 1872 Richmond (Yorks) by-election
  - 1872 Southern West Riding of Yorkshire by-election
  - 1872 Tamworth by-election
  - 1872 Tiverton by-election
  - 1872 Wallingford by-election
  - 1872 West Cheshire by-election
  - 1872 West Cumberland by-election
  - 1872 Wexford by-election
  - 1872 Wick Burghs by-election

== Australia ==
- 1872 Mudgee colonial by-election
- 1872 New South Wales colonial election
- 1872 Parramatta colonial by-election

== New Zealand ==
- 1872 City of Nelson by-election
- 1872 Coleridge by-election
- 1872 Rodney by-election
- 1872 Waikato by-election
- 1872 Waikouaiti by-election
- 1872 Wakatipu by-election
- 1872 Caversham by-election
- 1872 Egmont by-election
- 1872 Heathcote by-election
- 1872 Wairau by-election

== See also ==
- Category:1872 elections
