= 1872 New York gubernatorial election =

- November 3, 1872
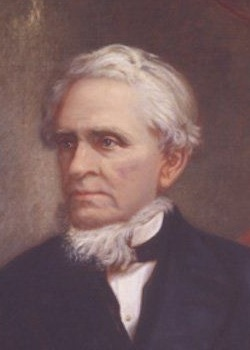

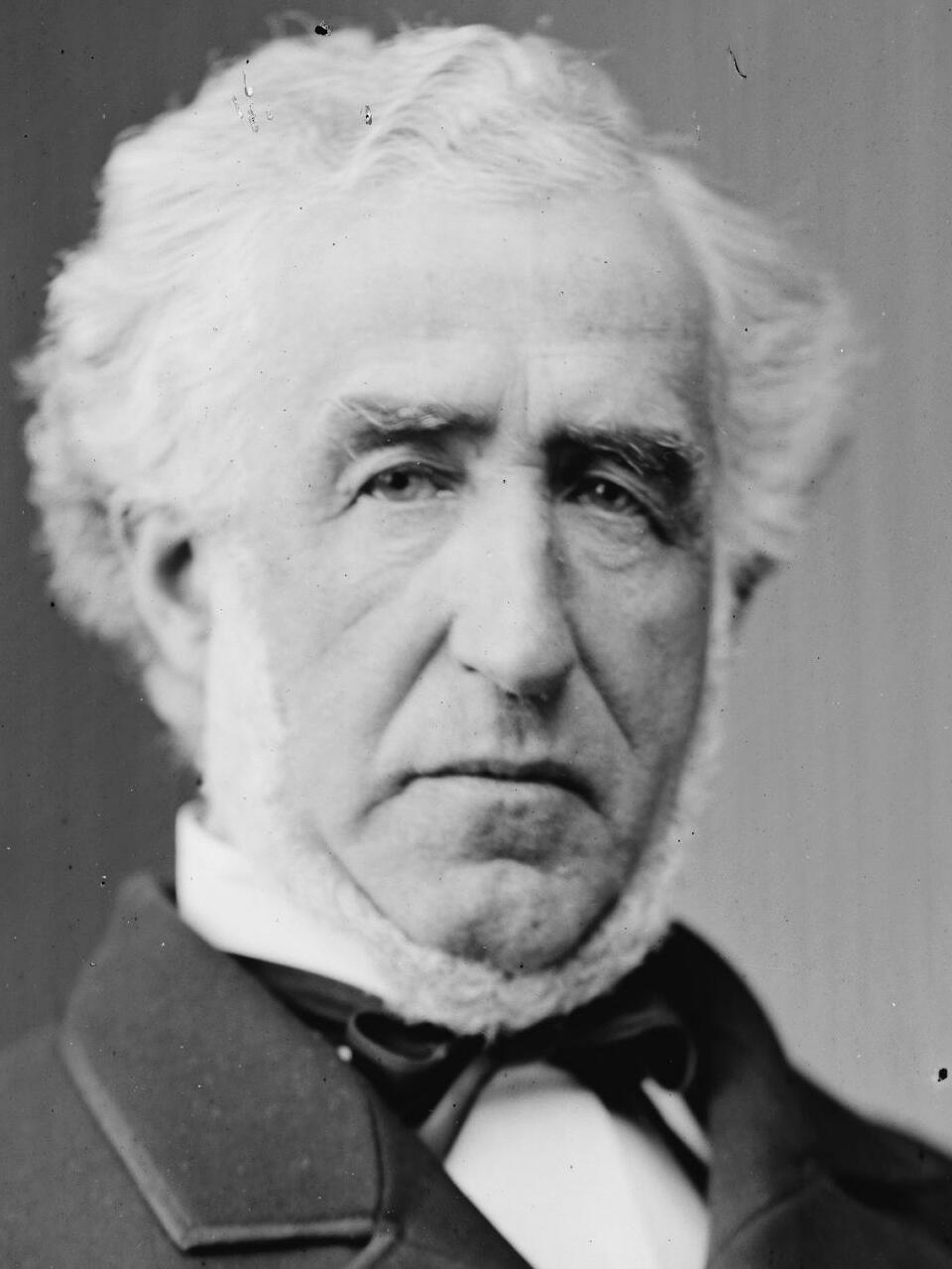
Nominee	John Adams Dix	Francis Kernan
Party	Republican	Democratic
Alliance		Liberal Republican
Popular vote	445,801	392,350
Percentage	53.19%	46.81%
- County results Dix: 50–60% 60–70% 70–80% Kernan: 50–60% 60–70%
Governor before election
John T. Hoffman
Democratic
Elected Governor
John Adams Dix
Republican

The 1872 New York gubernatorial election was held on November 3, 1872. Incumbent Governor John T. Hoffman was not a candidate for re-election. In the race to succeed him, Republican John Adams Dix defeated Francis Kernan, a member of the Democratic Party running with Liberal Republican support.

== Republican nomination ==
=== Candidates ===
- Freeman Clark, Rochester businessman (withdrawn at convention)
- John Adams Dix, former U.S. Minister to France, U.S. Senator and U.S. Secretary of the Treasury
- William H. Robertson, State Senator and former U.S. Representative from Katonah (withdrawn at convention)
- John C. Robinson, former Union Army brigadier general (withdrawn at convention)
- Martin I. Townsend, former District Attorney of Rensselaer County and nominee for Attorney General in 1869 (withdrawn at convention)

==== Withdrew ====
- Edwin D. Morgan, former Governor of New York

=== Convention ===
The Republican state convention met on August 21 in Utica. On the eve of the convention, former Governor Edwin Morgan was expected to easily win the nomination for governor over John Adams Dix with little fanfare. However, on the eve of the convention, delegates received word that both Dix and Morgan had declined to be candidates, and speculation fell on other names. Chief among them were William H. Robertson of Westchester County and John C. Robinson of Broome County. Robertson appeared to have a substantial early lead as delegated conferred overnight, but his supporters struggled to convince some Morgan supporters who would not abandon their candidate until they received his withdrawal in writing.

Morgan's clear written withdrawal came early on the morning of the convention, ending speculation. Robertson's faction continued to struggle, however, to convince delegates that he would have strength in New York City. Rumors persisted that Dix could be drafted as a candidate and that Robertson could not be an available candidate.

After the proceedings began, the floor was opened for nominations for governor. Robertson and Robinson were nominated, as well as Rochester businessman Freeman Clark and Rensselaer County attorney Martin I. Townsend. Robertson's nomination was nearly not seconded before proceeding to a ballot. After Charles Van Wyck delivered the seconding speech for Robertson, the convention was thrown into chaos when delegate George Washington Clark rose to nominate John Adams Dix. Dix was the first choice of most delegates, who took the nomination by Clark as a sign that Dix would be available as a candidate. Clark delivered a forceful speech endorsing Dix, which was followed by a powerful seconding speech by Edward Delafield Smith. Several more seconding speeches were made endorsing Dix, and once order was restored, supporters of Robertson, Robinson, Clark and Townsend were withdrawn. The motion to nominate Dix by acclamation carried unanimously by a voice vote.

Exiting the convention, Dix was considered the strong favorite to win the election.

== Democratic and Liberal Republican nominations ==
=== Candidates ===
- Francis Kernan, former U.S. Representative from Utica
- Sanford E. Church, Chief Judge of the New York Court of Appeals (withdrawn at convention)

=== Conventions ===
The Democratic state convention met at Wieting Opera House in Syracuse on September 4. Party chair Samuel J. Tilden called the convention to order and delivered a lengthy address calling for the end to sectional hostilities stemming from the Civil War. After some proceedings on delegate credentials, the convention recessed. At the same time, the Liberal Republican convention, led by Reuben Fenton and John Cochrane, allies of Horace Greeley, met at Shakespeare Hall in the same city. After an address by temporary chair T. G. Younglove, the convention resolved to confer with the Democratic delegates and reconvene following a recess. After both conventions recessed and conferred, they met briefly before adjourning for the night.

Throughout the day, supporters of Chief Judge Sanford E. Church and former U.S. Representative Francis Kernan struggled for the gubernatorial nomination. While a large number of delegates supported Church, Kernan's supporters threatened to publish a letter in which Church personally declined to run and endorsed Kernan. Facing no other option, the Church supporters sought to induce Kernan's supporters to withdraw his name. They were unsuccessful, however, and Kernan's supporters further threatened to raise a religious issue by telling voters that Kernan was forced out of the race because he was Catholic.

In addition to the struggle between Church and Kernan supporters within the Democratic Party, Tilden and Younglove struggled to bring their two parties together in support of a single ticket. When the Liberal Republicans demanded the right to nominate a United States Representative at-large, a new office as of 1872, Democratic delegates who supported Samuel S. Cox revolted against Tilden, forcing him to return to the negotiating table. In short order, the parties reached an agreement to exchange U.S. Representative at-large for the offices of Lieutenant Governor and State Prison Inspector.

With the allocations between the parties sorted, the Democratic delegates proceeded to balloting for governor. The New York Times estimated that four-fifths of the convention preferred Church, but his letter to Kernan (as well as to various other parties) had destroyed his opportunity to honorably accept the nomination. The Kernan supporters' threats of division further settled the matter, and after a single ballot on which Church received only 15–20 votes (including all of Kings County), his name was withdrawn, and a motion was made and carried to make Kernan's nomination unanimous.

== General election ==
=== Candidates ===
- John Adams Dix, former U.S. Minister to France, U.S. Senator and U.S. Secretary of the Treasury (Republican)
- Francis Kernan, former U.S. Representative from Utica (Democratic and Liberal Republican)

=== Results ===
1872 New York gubernatorial election
Party	Candidate	Votes	%	±%
Republican	John Adams Dix	445,801	53.19%	▲5.35
Democratic	Francis Kernan	392,350	46.81%	▼5.35
Total votes		838,151	100.00%	

== See also ==
- New York gubernatorial elections
- 1872 New York state election
- 1872 United States elections
