= 1875 United States Senate election in New York =

- January 19–20, 1875

Majority vote of legislature needed to win
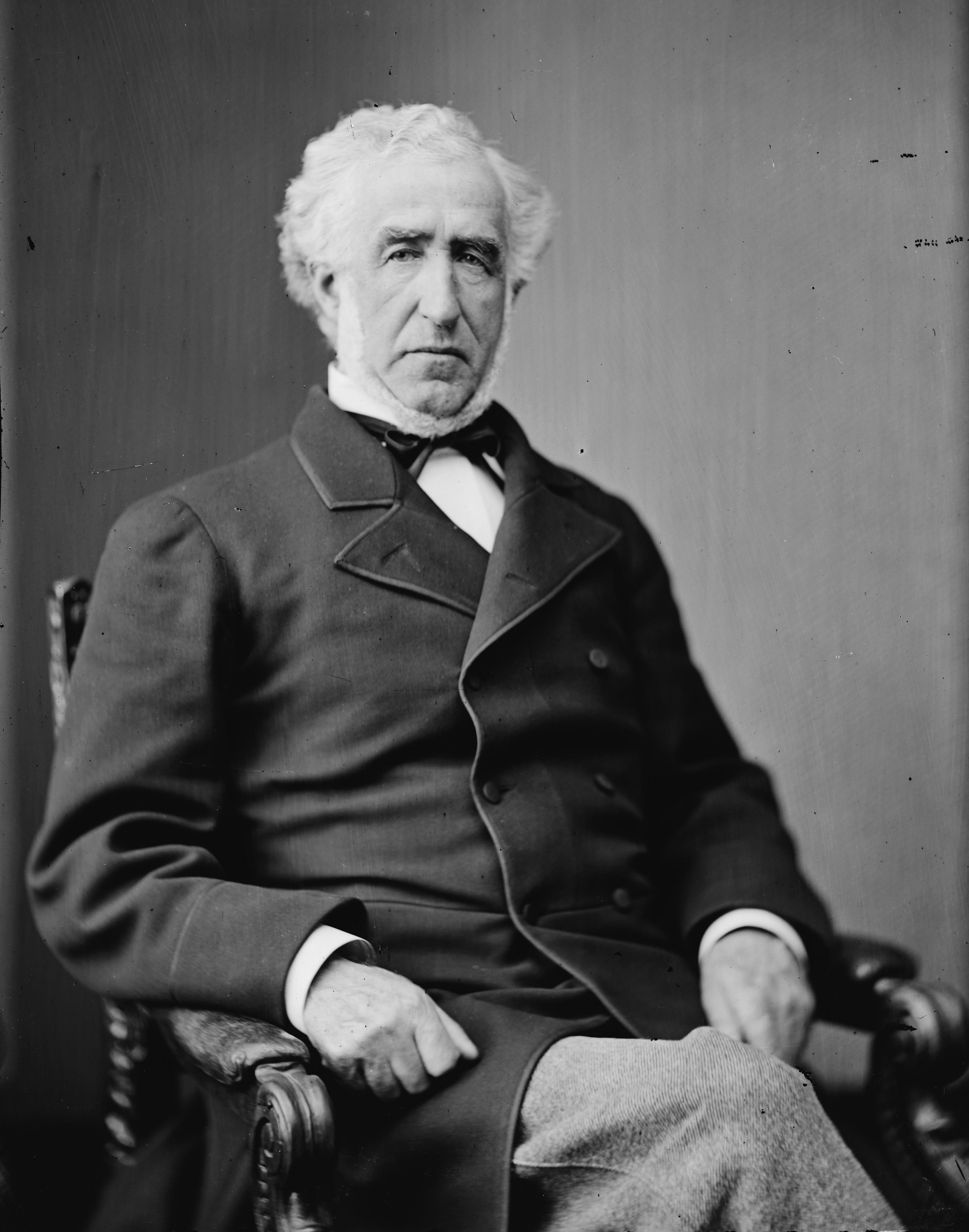

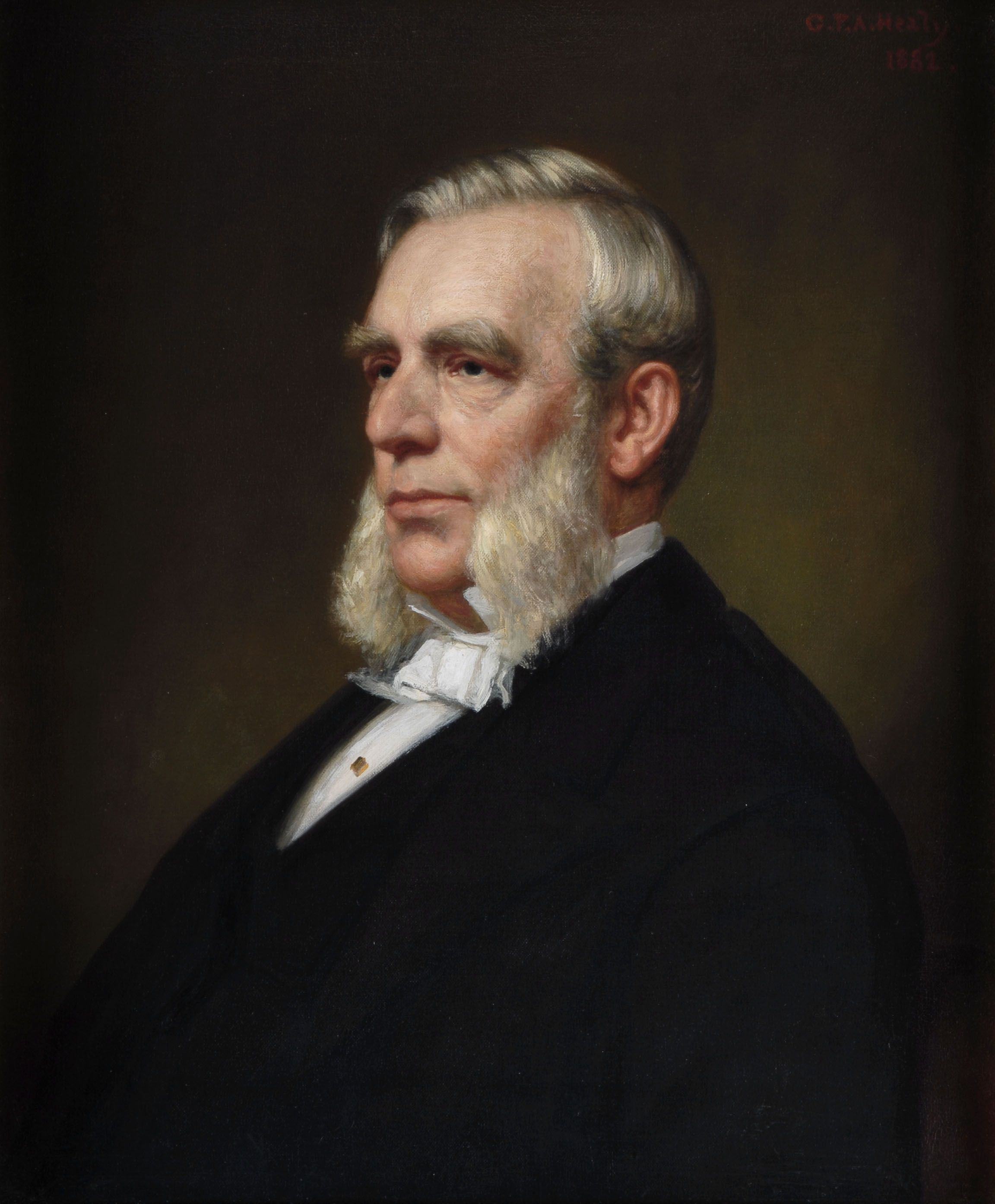
Nominee	Francis Kernan	Edwin D. Morgan
Party	Democratic	Republican
Electoral vote	87	68
Percentage	55.77%	43.59%
Senator before election
Reuben Fenton
Republican
Elected Senator
Francis Kernan
Democratic

The 1875 United States Senate election in New York was held on January 19 and 20, 1875, by the New York State Legislature. The legislature, with a Republican Senate and Democratic Assembly, jointly elected Democrat Francis Kernan as senator. Kernan became the first Democrat to represent New York since 1851.

== Background ==
Republican Reuben E. Fenton had been elected in January 1869 to this seat, and his term would expire on March 3, 1875.

At the State election in November 1873, a Republican majority was elected for a two-year term (1874–1875) in the State Senate. At the State election in November 1874, Democrat Samuel J. Tilden was elected Governor, 75 Democrats and 53 Republicans were elected for the session of 1875 to the Assembly, and Democrat Albert P. Laning was elected in the 31st District to fill a vacancy in the State Senate. The 98th New York State Legislature met from January 5 to May 19, 1875, at Albany, New York.

== Candidates ==
=== Democratic caucus ===
The caucus of Democratic State legislators met on January 15, State Senator Albert P. Laning, of Buffalo, presided. All but one of the legislators were present, only Assemblyman John M. Roscoe, of Schoharie County, was sick. The caucus nominated Francis Kernan for the U.S. Senate. Kernan had been the Democratic/Liberal Republican candidate for Governor in November 1872 but had been defeated by John Adams Dix. Now Kernan was the choice of Tammany boss John Kelly who had succeeded the corrupt William M. Tweed. Kelly was opposed by John C. Jacobs, who proposed Ex-State Senator Henry C. Murphy, Jacobs's predecessor from the 3rd District, and the Democratic candidate who had lost the U.S. Senate elections in 1867 and 1869 when the Democrats were the minority. Kelly stood firm in his intention to dominate the Democratic Party, and had the caucus nomination made by viva voce vote instead of the more traditional secret ballot. Jacobs and Murphy had expected to get votes from many legislators who would not dare to cross Kelly openly, but had to abandon their hopes when the secret ballot was voted down 74 to 13.

1875 Democratic caucus for United States Senator result
Office	Candidate	First ballot
U.S. Senator	Francis Kernan	77
	Henry C. Murphy	9
	John T. Hoffman	1

=== Republican caucus ===
The caucus of the Republican State legislators nominated Ex-U.S. Senator from New York Edwin D. Morgan.

== Election ==
On January 19, the Democratic majority of the Assembly nominated Francis Kernan, and the Republican majority of the State Senate nominated Ex-U.S. Senator Edwin D. Morgan. On January 20, both Houses met in joint session to compare nominations, and finding that they disagreed, proceeded to a joint ballot. Francis Kernan was elected, the first Democratic U.S. Senator from New York since 1851 when Daniel S. Dickinson left office.

== Result ==
1875 United States Senator election result
Office	House	Democrat		Republican		Democrat	
U.S. Senator	State Senate (32 members)	Francis Kernan	13	Edwin D. Morgan	16		
	State Assembly (128 members)	Francis Kernan	74	Edwin D. Morgan	52	John T. Hoffman	1
	Joint Ballot (160 members)	Francis Kernan	87	Edwin D. Morgan	68	John T. Hoffman	1

Note: The vote for Ex-Governor of New York Hoffman was cast by Reuben E. Fenton's brother-in-law Samuel Scudder, a Democratic Assemblyman from Cattaraugus County.

== Aftermath ==
Kernan served one term, and remained in office until March 3, 1881. In January 1881, he was nominated by the Democratic caucus for re-election, but was defeated by Republican Thomas C. Platt.

== See also ==
- United States Senate elections, 1874

== Sources ==
- Members of the 44th United States Congress
- NEW-YORK ELECTIONS.; Results of the Official Canvass for the Various Officers in NYT on November 19, 1874
- THE SENATORSHIP.; FRANCIS KERNAN'S SWEEPING VICTORY in NYT on January 16, 1875
- ALBANY.; ELECTION OF KERNAN TO THE SENATE in NYT on January 21, 1875
