= Charles Edwin King =

Youngest confirmed soldier to die during the American Civil War

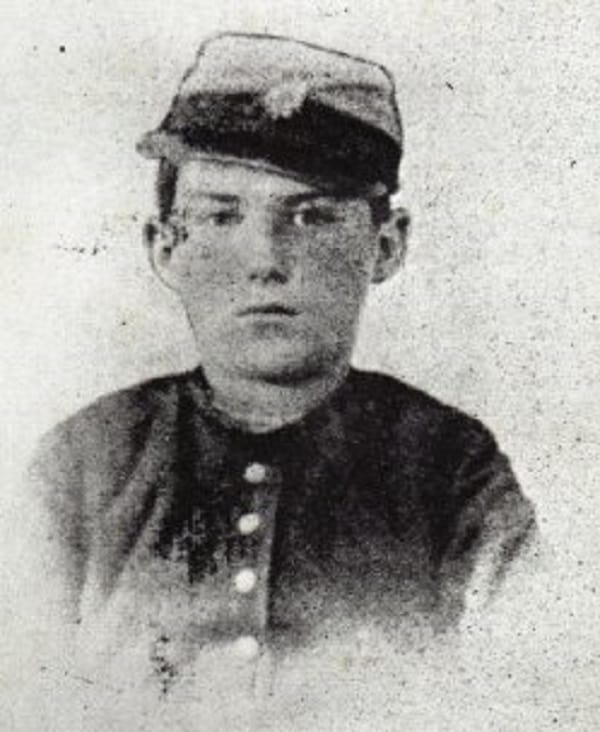
- Drummer boy Charles King
- Born: April 3, 1849; West Chester, Pennsylvania, US
- Died: September 20, 1862 (aged 13); Antietam, Washington County, Sharpsburg, Maryland, US
- Military career
- Allegiance: United States
- Branch: Union Army
- Service years: 1861–62
- Rank: Drum major
- Unit: 49th Pennsylvania Infantry Regiment
- Conflicts: American Civil War: Peninsula Campaign; Siege of Yorktown; Battle of Williamsburg; Battle of Garnett's & Golding's Farm; Battle of Savage's Station; Battle of White Oak Swamp; Battle of Malvern Hill; Battle of South Mountain; Battle of Antietam (DOW)

Charles Edwin King (April 3, 1849 – September 20, 1862), was a Union drummer boy during the American Civil War. Being mortally wounded at the Battle of Antietam, he is the youngest confirmed soldier from either side to die during the war.

== Early life ==
Charles Edwin King, also known as Charley, was born on April 3, 1849, in West Chester, Pennsylvania to Pennell King and Adeline Bennett. His father was a tailor, and evidently Charley gained musical talent in his youth.

On April 14, 1861 news reached West Chester about the surrender of Fort Sumter, and within a day the city began efforts to raise a company of troops. The company raised would become part of the 9th Pennsylvania Infantry Regiment (3 Months).

== American Civil War ==
On April 23 the West Chester Company of the 9th Pennsylvania Infantry departed for Harrisburg, and young Charley King followed along, remaining with the regiment during their training in Harrisburg but his parents would not allow him to proceed with the company to Virginia.

In July 1861 the 90-days men were discharged and efforts at raising a new company began in West Chester. The new company would become Company F of the 49th Pennsylvania Infantry Regiment. King attempted to enlist again with this company, but his parents refused due to his age, but with the intervention of Captain Benjamin Sweney, King finally joined the company as a Musician on September 25, at the age of 12 years, five months, and 9 days. By December 1861, King had proved his worth as a drummer and was promoted to drum-major, heading the regimental band.

King and the 49th Pennsylvania served in the defenses of Washington until March 1862, when they embarked to participate in the Peninsula Campaign. King fought in six battles in the Peninsula Campaign and Seven Days Battles, bravely drumming in the heat of combat.

In August the regiment covered the retreat of the Union Army from the Second Battle of Bull Run, and by September were facing off against Lee's army in Maryland. They fought at Crampton's Gap during the Battle of South Mountain, and on September 17, were in a supporting role near the infamous cornfield at Antietam. While waiting to go into action on the edge of the cornfield, Confederate artillery and skirmishers opened fire, wounding and killing some men of the 49th Pennsylvania.

Charles King was struck through the torso by a Confederate shell and fell into the arms of H.H. Bowles of the 6th Maine Infantry. He was carried off the battlefield to a nearby field hospital, where nothing could be done for his fatal wound. King died in the field hospital three days later, September 20, 1862, at the age of 13 years, 5 months, and 17 days.

== Legacy ==
The Jeffersonian, a West Chester newspaper, reported in October 1862 that: "The ball, we understand, passed through his lungs, and he survived but a day or two. When his father, Pennell King, went on to take care of him, as he supposed, he found the grave only, in which his son's remains were deposited."

No record of Charles King's grave at Antietam National Cemetery can be found, and it is likely he is buried in a mass grave on the battlefield. He is commemorated with a monument at his parents' grave in Green Mount Cemetery in West Goshen.

King remains a Civil War folk figure to this day, and along with Johnny Clem and Edward Black, serves as a symbol for the thousands of drummer boys who served during the Civil War.
