= Edward Black (soldier) =

American soldier (1853–1872)

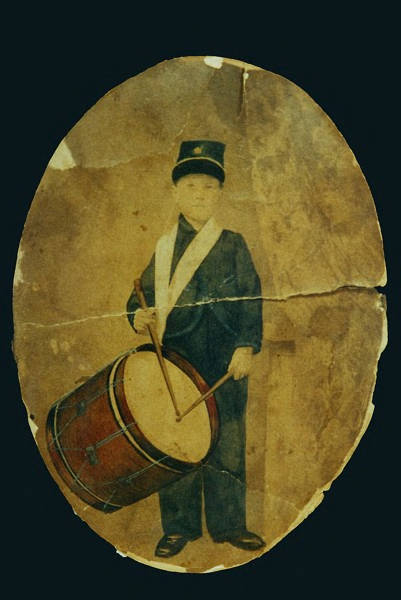
- Born: May 30, 1853; Indianapolis, Indiana, US?
- Died: June 30, 1872 (aged 19); Indianapolis, Indiana, U.S.
- Resting place: Crown Hill National Cemetery, Indianapolis, Indiana, Section 16, Lot 148; 39.8174551°N 86.1745098°W
- Occupations: Drummer Boy, Soldier
- Employer: U.S. Government
- Known for: Considered the youngest serving soldier of the American Civil War
- Military career
- Allegiance: United States
- Branch: United States Army; Union Army
- Service years: July 24, 1861–January 1866
- Rank: Private 1st Class
- Units: 21st Indiana Infantry; 1st Indiana Heavy Artillery Regiment
- Conflicts: American Civil War; Battle of Baton Rouge (POW)

Edward Black (May 30, 1853 – June 30, 1872) was a drummer boy in the Union Army during the Civil War. At the age of eight, he is considered the youngest serving soldier of the American Civil War.

== Early life ==
Edward Black was born on May 30, 1853, in Hagerstown, Wayne County, Indiana, to Lydia Ann and George H. Black. He had a twin brother, Edwin, who died in 1854.

== Civil War ==
Black enlisted at the age of eight on July 6, 1861, as a drummer boy for Company L of the 21st Indiana Infantry. He was captured at the Battle of Baton Rouge while his band marched into town playing the tune Picayune. He was held as a prisoner of war at Ship Island. He served one year and two months, but was discharged when his organization disbanded on September 11, 1862, at Camp Carrollton. He re-enlisted with his father in February 1863. He served with the 1st Indiana Heavy Artillery until January 1866.

== Death and legacy ==
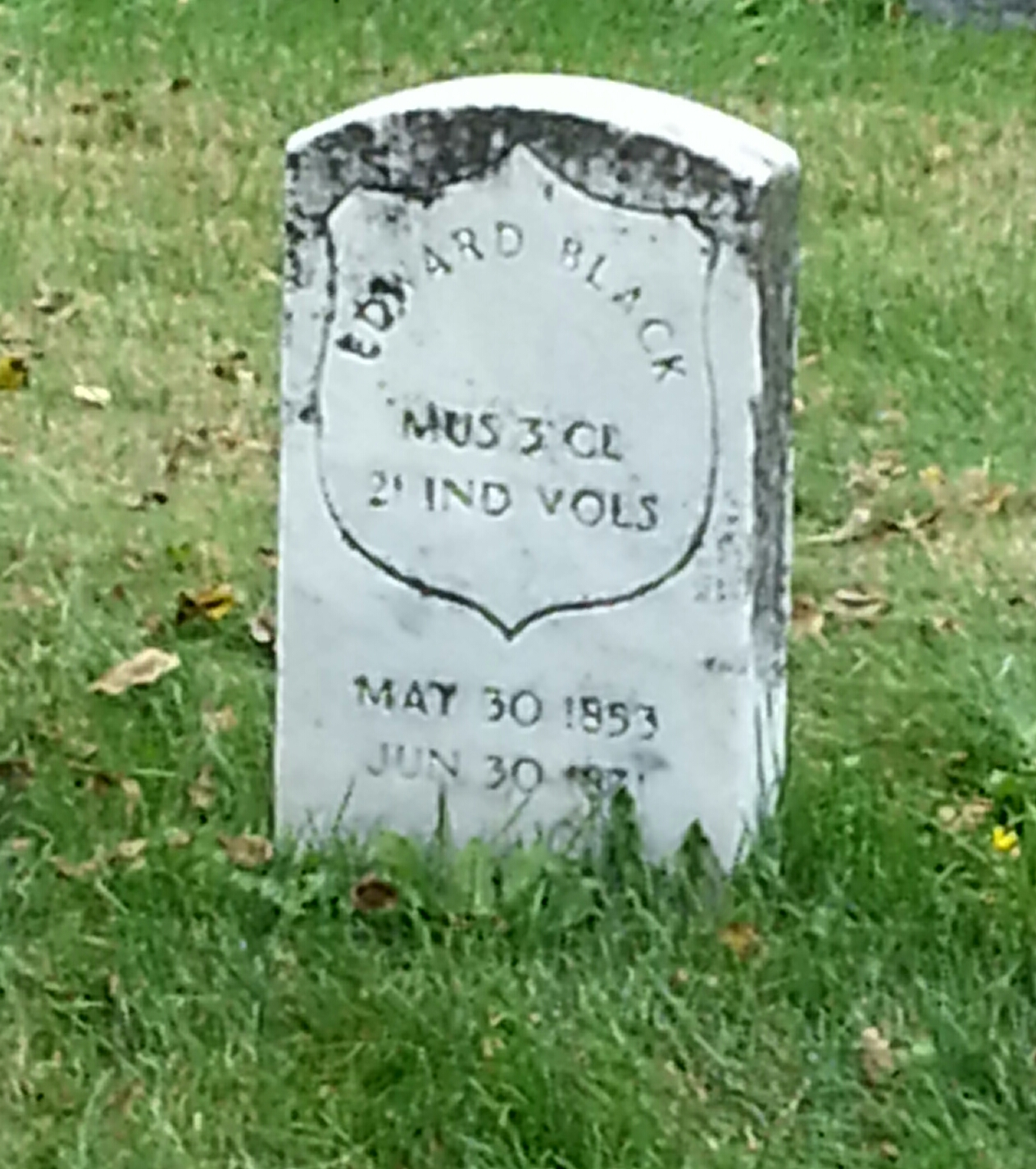
Black's grave at Crown Hill National Cemetery

Black died on June 30, 1872, in Indianapolis. He was interred along with his twin brother Edwin in Crown Hill National Cemetery in Indianapolis. The inscription of his grave reads, "Civil War Drummer Boy. The youngest soldier of the Rebellion. 8 years, 6 months."

The drum Black used and his war records are in the collection of the Children's Museum of Indianapolis.

== See also ==
- William Black
