= Gustav Koerner =

German-American jurist (1809–1896)

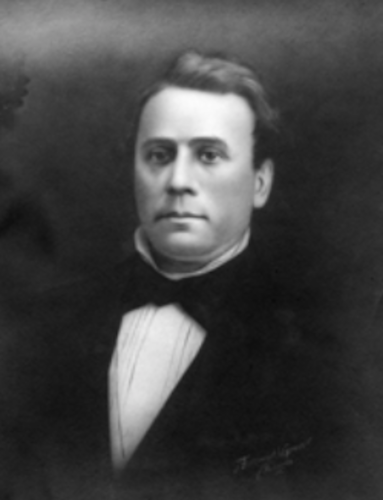
- Koerner's portrait at the Illinois Supreme Court, c. 1848.

12th Lieutenant Governor of Illinois
- In office 10 January 1853 – 12 January 1857
- Governor: Joel Aldrich Matteson
- Preceded by: William McMurtry
- Succeeded by: John Wood

17th United States Minister to Spain
- In office 14 June 1862 – 20 July 1864
- President: Abraham Lincoln
- Preceded by: Carl Schurz
- Succeeded by: John P. Hale

Member of the Illinois House of Representatives
- In office 1842

Personal details
- Born: Gustav Philipp Körner; 20 November 1809 Free City of Frankfurt
- Died: 9 April 1896 (aged 86) Belleville, Illinois, U.S.
- Resting place: Walnut Hill Cemetery, Belleville, Illinois
- Citizenship: United States (1838)
- Party: Republican (co-founder)
- Other political affiliations: Democratic; Liberal Republican
- Spouse: Sophie Engelmann (m. 1836; died 1888)
- Children: 1. Theodore (*1837); 2. Margaret (*1838); 3. Mary (*1838); 4. Augusta (*1842); 5. Gustavus Adolphus (*1845); 6. Paulina (*1847); 7. Caroline (*1848); 8. Frederick (*1849); 9. Victor (*1853)
- Education: University of Heidelberg, Transylvania University
- Occupation: Politician; lawyer; judge; journalist
- Profession: Doctor juris utriusque
- Website: www.gustavekoerner.org

Military service
- Allegiance: United States of America; Union
- Branch/service: United States Army; Union Army
- Years of service: 1861–1862
- Rank: Colonel, Brig. General
- Unit: 43rd Illinois Volunteer Infantry Regiment
- Battles/wars: American Civil War

Gustav Philipp Koerner, also spelled Gustave or Gustavus Koerner (20 November 1809 – 9 April 1896), was a German-American revolutionary, journalist, lawyer, politician, judge and statesman in Illinois and Germany, and a Colonel of the U.S. Army who was a confessed enemy of slavery. He married on 17 June 1836 in Belleville Sophia Dorothea Engelmann (16 November 1815 – 1 March 1888); they had 9 children. He belonged to the co-founders and was one of the first members of the Grand Old Party, and was a close confidant of Abraham Lincoln and his wife Mary Todd, and had an essential role in his nomination and election for president in 1860.

== Life ==
=== Early life and education ===
Gustav was the son of the Frankfurt publisher, bookseller and art dealer Bernhard Körner (1776–1829) and his wife Maria Magdalena Kämpfe (1776–1847), daughter of another Frankfurt bookseller. He graduated with Abitur from the Gymnasium Francofurtanum. Then he studied law at the University of Jena, the Ludwig-Maximilians-Universität München, and Heidelberg University, and graduated 1832 from Heidelberg University as Dr. iuris utriusque, doctor as well as German and Roman law.

=== Escape from Persecution in Germany ===
On Christmas Eve 1830 in Munich, Koerner was involved in a somewhat drunken snowball fight that led to a confrontation with the Gendarmerie of that city in royal Bavaria where an officer was knocked down and wounded. Because of his participation in these so-called "Christmas riots," he was taken into custody for four months, later recalling that during the time of his captivity he learned more about the law than during the whole of his two-years of study at the University of Jena. Owing to this event, the Ludwig-Maximilians-Universität München was temporarily closed and after his custody, Koerner changed to the university in Heidelberg.

Koerner was one of the participants at the Hambach Festival in the spring of 1832 which was held to prepare a free, democratic, and unified state in Germany. The German Confederation's legation of sovereigns, the Bundestag (officially called the Bundesversammlung, Federal Assembly), was located in the Palais Thurn und Taxis in the center of Frankfurt, Koerner's native city. During the Frankfurter Wachensturm in 1833, a failed attempt by students to start a revolution in all states of the German Confederation, Koerner was injured and, to avoid being prosecuted by the authorities and held captive for high treason which would threaten capital punishment, he escaped in female dress to France. A warrant was out for him. He is counted as one of the Dreissiger.

The Central Federal Bureau for Investigations (German: Bundes-Central-Behörde für Untersuchungen) in Frankfurt was set up after the revolt against the reign of the President of the German Confederation, Francis I, Emperor of Austria, his chancellor Prince Metternich and his other vassals including King Frederick William III of Prussia. These authorities assigned him number 908 with the name Gustav Peter Philipp Koerner in their infamous "black book" of revolutionary suspects. The Free City of Frankfurt was occupied by federal troops from Austria and Prussia which meant a de facto total loss of its independence.

=== Rescued by "Angels" ===
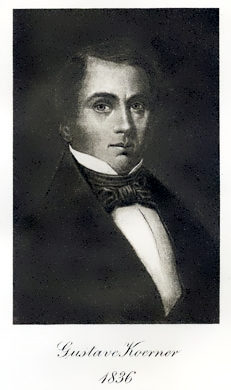
Koerner in his youth.

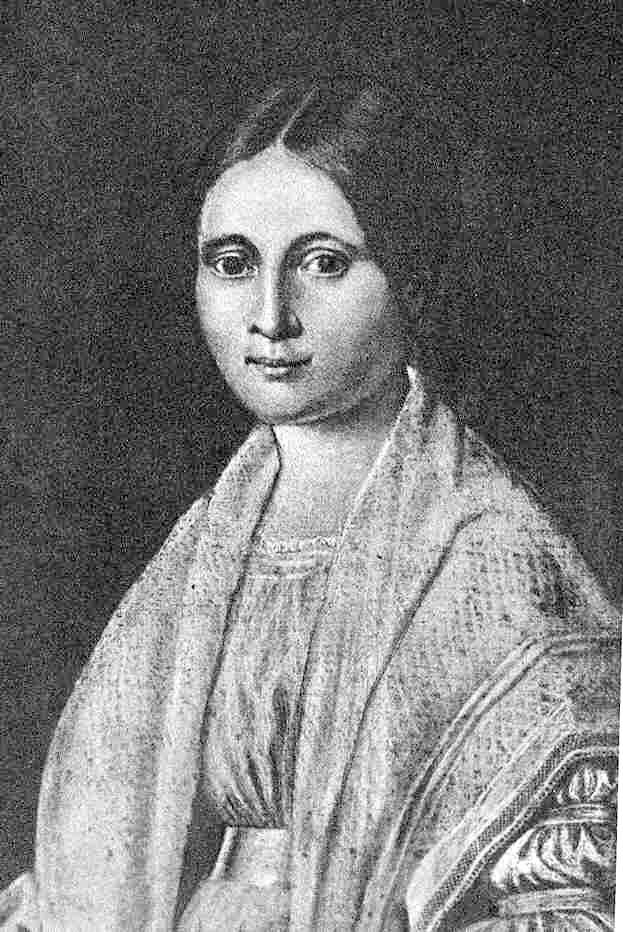
Sophie Koerner, née Engelmann (1815–1888), spouse of Gustav Koerner

On 1 May 1833, Koerner boarded a ship in Le Havre sailing to North America with a group of emigrants headed by the patriarch of the Engelmann family, whose son Theodor was an old friend of his from college. On the passage he became engaged to his future wife Sophie, a daughter of Engelmann's who was born in Imsbach in the Palatinate (Pfalz), a historic region of Germany. A year earlier, as a vanguard for the family, her cousin George Engelmann had explored the region of the Midwestern United States. George was also from Frankfurt, about the same age as Gustav, and had attended the same school, receiving a degree as M.D. and later becoming a famous expert in the botany of North America.

They reached the Port of New York City on 17 June and went next to St. Louis in Missouri, a slave state that Koerner deeply abhorred. Shortly after, having departed that city, he and the Engelmanns settled down in the Shiloh Valley near Belleville, Illinois.

Demonstrating the sincerity and earnestness of Koerner's attitude toward the abolition of slavery, the 50th anniversary edition of the "Belleviller Zeitung" printed this example from "those memorable days of the anti-slavery movement: A large crowd was gathered in great excitement in Belleville's public square. Koerner, inquiring for the cause of this unusual gathering and learning that a slave was being offered for sale, rose from his horse, went to the auction stand, bought the slave, and immediately gave him freedom."

Koerner continued his legal studies in American law at Transylvania University in Lexington, Kentucky during 1834–1835. While at the university, he got to know Mary Todd, who, a few years later, married Abraham Lincoln. From 1835 he practiced in Belleville as a lawyer in his own firm, then practiced in the office of Adam W. Snyder in Belleville and from 1837 worked in the office of James Shields. In 1838 he received American citizenship.

=== Elected ===
Koerner was elected to the Illinois House of Representatives in 1842, served on the Illinois Supreme Court from 1845 to 1848, and as the 12th Lieutenant Governor of Illinois from 1853 to 1857. Originally a Democrat, he became a member of the Republican Party after its formation, and helped develop its anti-slavery platform. As a friend, he took over some of Abraham Lincoln's cases when Lincoln was elected president.

Koerner was the first citizen of German extraction ever elected to the Illinois or Missouri legislatures. In 1851, in a clash with the editor of Anzeiger des Westens Henry Boernstein, he called the Forty-Eighters Greens in his Belleviller Zeitung newspaper and Boernstein, in a published reply, insultingly called him Gray Gustav.

=== Service for the Country ===
In 1861, Koerner was instrumental in raising the 43rd Illinois Volunteer Infantry Regiment but before its organization had been completed, he was appointed Colonel of Volunteers and assigned as aide to Gen. John C. Frémont, upon whose removal he was assigned to Gen. Henry W. Halleck's staff as Brigadier General. He resigned in April 1862 due to impaired health. Shortly thereafter, he succeeded Carl Schurz as United States Ambassador to Spain.

The expectation was that Koerner would prevent Spain from entering into the American Civil War on the side of the Southern slave states. Although Koerner, the Envoy Extraordinary and Minister Plenipotentiary of the United States of America (his precise titles as ambassador) managed to accomplish this objective, he was discontented in Spain and asked the president several times for a replacement. An important reason prompting his request was that the stipend for his ambassadorship did not nearly cover the huge financial obligations expected of him at the Spanish court. Koerner had to provide such funds from his private accounts. In 1864, he left the diplomatic service and returned to the United States.

=== Pallbearer ===
After the Assassination of Abraham Lincoln a special honour was granted him. Koerner was one of the pallbearers who carried the corpse of the president in the state funeral. The other men, all of them Lincoln's friends from his time in Springfield, Illinois, who conducted the coffin were:

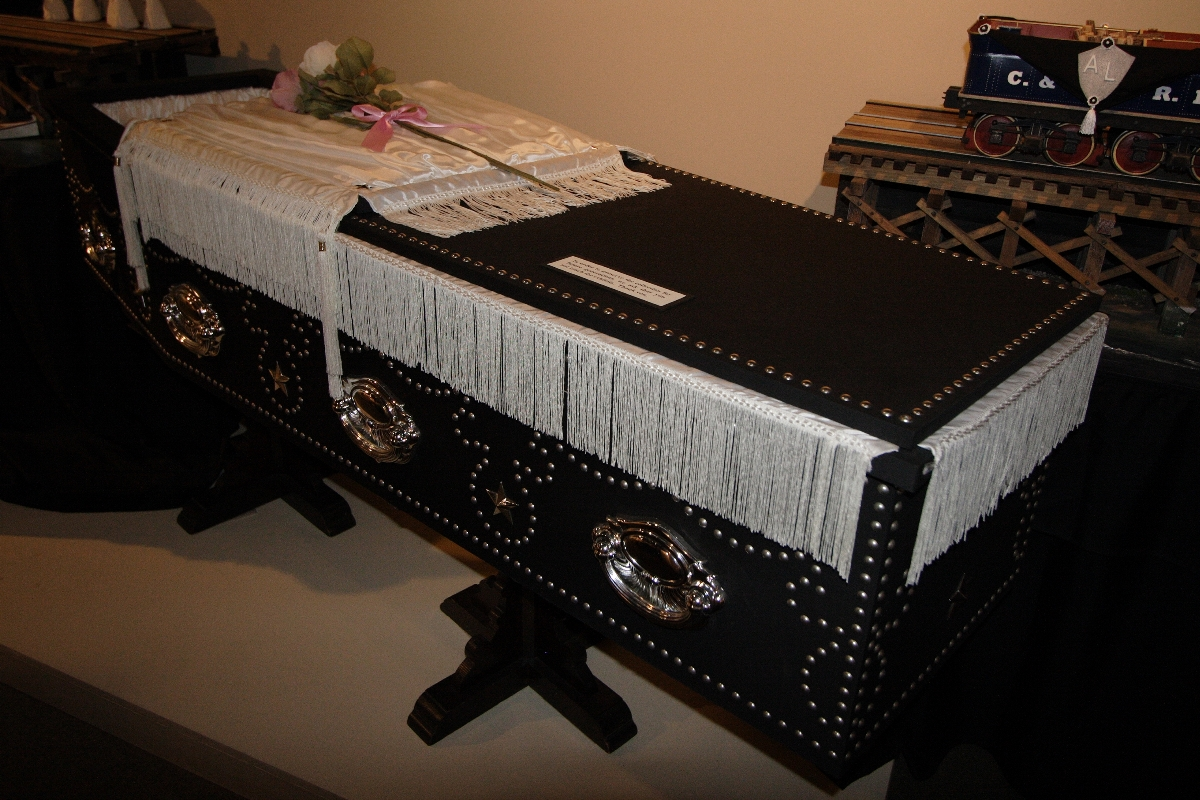
Replica of the coffin of Abraham Lincoln, Museum of Funeral Customs, Springfield, Illinois, 2006.

- Jesse K. Dubois
- Stephen T. Logan
- James L. Lamb
- Samuel Hubbel Treat Jr.
- John Williams
- Erastus White
- J. M. Brown
- Jacob Bunn
- Charles Matheny
- Elisha Iles
- John T. Stuart

=== Last years ===
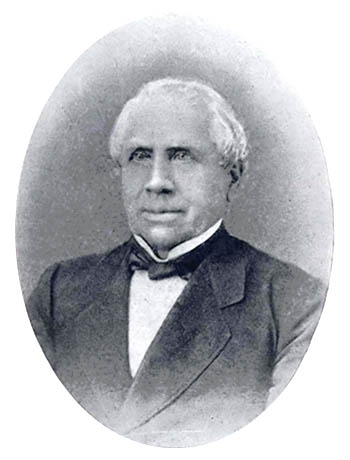
Koerner in his last years.

In 1867 Koerner was appointed president of the board of trustees that organized the Illinois Soldiers' Orphans' Home at Bloomington, and in 1870 he became president of the first board of railroad commissioners of Illinois. A supporter of Ulysses S. Grant's successful 1868 presidential election bid, in 1872 he became a supporter of the Liberal Republican Party, belonging to the nominating committee which chose Horace Greeley as its (unsuccessful) US presidential candidate.

In the same year Koerner ran for election (→ Illinois gubernatorial election, 1872) to the office of Governor of Illinois, though the Republican Richard James Oglesby (1824–1899) won the election. He then backed the Democratic candidate Samuel J. Tilden for the U.S. presidency in a contentious election of 1876 and remained with this party afterwards.

In 1874, Koerner's wife Sophia, together with Henry Raab (1837–1901), a German immigrant (1854) from Wetzlar, a librarian in Belleville and later a well-known educator, established, with others, one of the first kindergartens. She became the first president of the Belleville Kindergarten Association which received $2,100 (~$52,387 in 2024) in contributions from 70 shareholders and, supported by 150 other women, one year later was serving 201 pupils taught by three educators. This institute followed the Julius Fröbel system of primary education for training children effortlessly. The building was finished in April 1875 for $5,000 but it was sold in 1892 to the Belleville Philharmonic Society.

=== Reminiscences ===
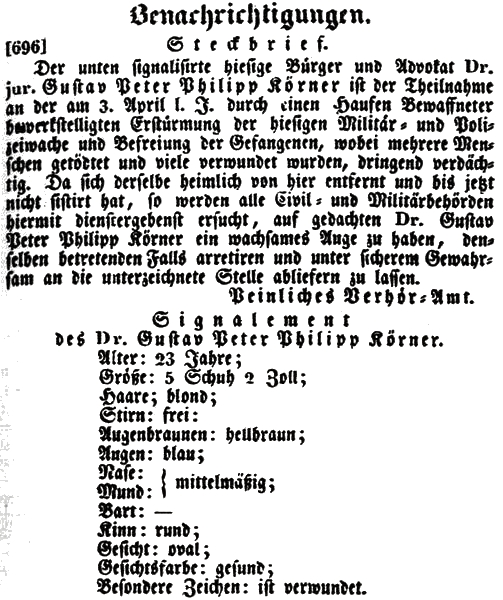
Warrant of Apprehension of the year 1833 for Gustav Peter Philipp Körner, exhibited by the Scrupulous Interrogation Office (German: Peinliches Verhör-Amt).

At the suggestion of farmer Dr. Anton Schott, a graduate in Theology and Philosophy, Koerner, together with other Latin Farmers, in 1836 founded the public library in Belleville, probably the first in Illinois. Although he had never pursued agriculture as a profession, he is counted among the group of Latin farmers, which was a half-satirical, half-respectful designation for people like him, German immigrants in the United States who had received an advanced academic education.

Koerner was an active lawyer, and also wrote articles for several newspapers, among others the "Belleviller Zeitung" and the "Anzeiger des Westens" (published in St. Louis), American newspapers in the German language. He had great influence on the growing German community in North America in the second half of the 19th century. On the recommendation of his friend and biographer Heinrich Rattermann (1832–1923), he began at the end of 1886 to record his memoirs. Koerner did not consider publication – he wrote down the detailed retrospective of his life as a recollection for his numerous descendants. His memoirs were published in two volumes in 1909, 13 years after his death and in the year of his 100th birthday, in Cedar Rapids, Iowa.

Today Koerner's former home is registered in the National Register of Historic Places. It was acquired in 2001 by the City of Belleville and is being restored by the historical society of St. Clair County, Illinois (St. Clair County Historical Society) as a museum dedicated to the well-known German-American. It will illuminate Koerner's friendship with Abraham Lincoln. In 2009, Belleville celebrated Koerner's 200th birthday with a festive dinner attended by Koerner and Engelmann descendants. The following day, they planted an American white oak tree (the state tree of Illinois) at Koerner's Walnut Hill grave and presented a valuable exhibit for the planned Koerner Museum: a heavy silver tablet, given by Queen Isabella II of Spain in 1864 to Gustav Koerner for his farewell as a US ambassador to Spain.

== Do right and fear no one ==
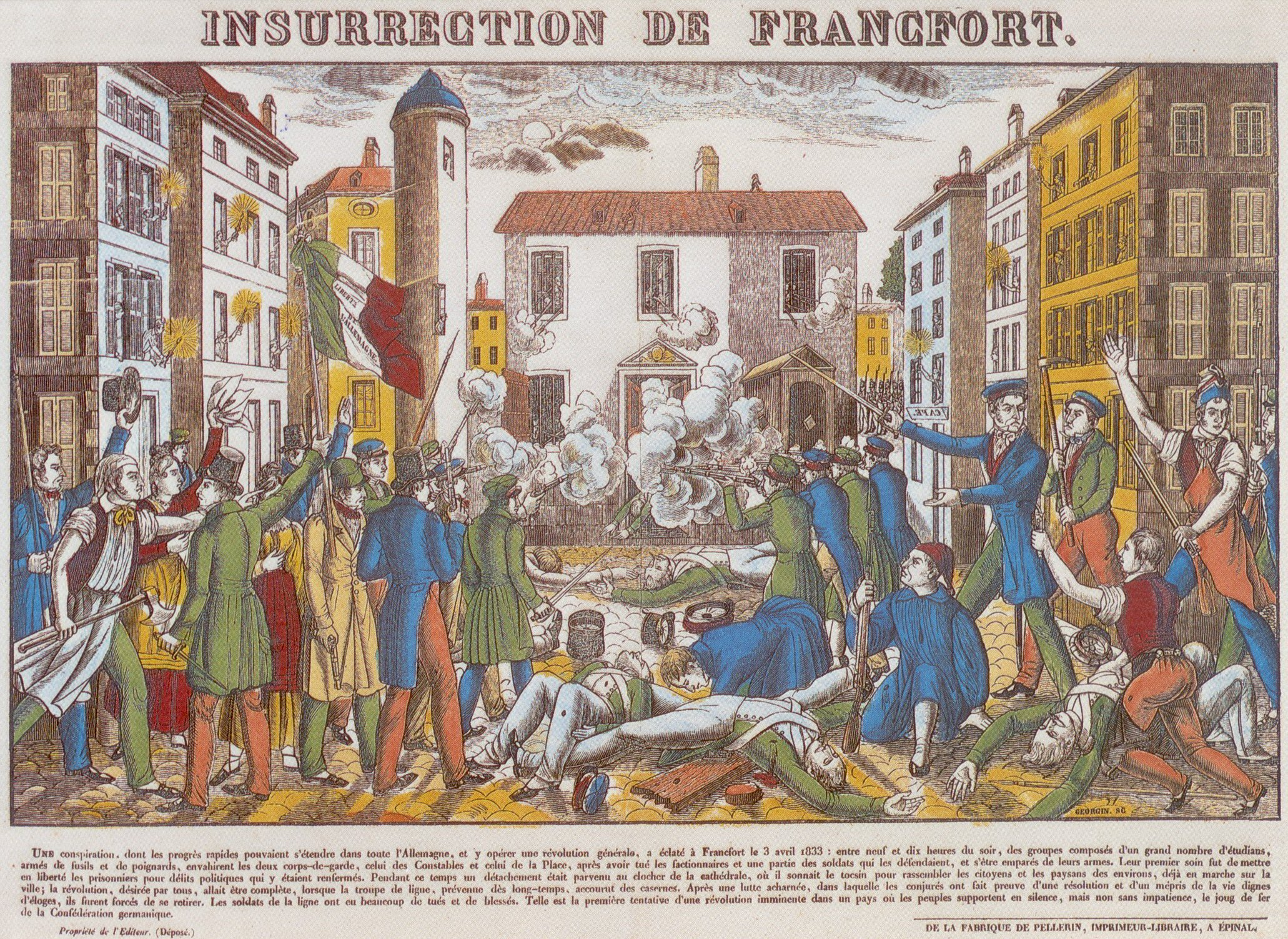
Storming the Guards of Frankfurt at night on 3 April 1833, contemporary history copper engraving.

The historical society of St. Clair County, Illinois, in which Belleville is located, will restore the former home of Gustav Koerner to a museum under the motto "Do right and fear no one," which in 2009 was also the motto of his 200th birthday celebration. "Act properly and fear no one" was, however, not quite his personal motto. Rather, in his memoirs he described this phrase as the "religion" of most Burschenschafter (fraternity students) during his student years at Jena – though he still may have made it his own basic position as an active Burschenschafter.

Our society was open to both Jew and Gentile, and I really should not have been able to tell the religion of most of my friends. "Do right and fear no one," seems to have been the only religion adopted amongst us.

— Gustave Koerner, Memoirs of Gustave Koerner

One of his personal leitmotivs was pointed out by the "Belleviller Zeitung" (the local German language newspaper) on 11 January 1899, nearly three years after his death, in a biography in the jubilee edition at the 50th anniversary of their first appearance:

The whole work of his long life full of fame may be added up as a continual statement of his favorite motto, namely: No rights without duties, no duties without rights.

== See also ==
- Gustave Koerner House
- Illinois gubernatorial election, 1852
- List of governors of Illinois
- List of lieutenant governors of Illinois

=== External ===
- Belleville Zeitung

== Works ==
- Koerner, Gustave (1909). McCormack, Thomas J. (ed.). Memoirs of Gustave Koerner, 1809-1896, Life-Sketches Written at the Suggestion of His Children, Volume 1 (book). Digitization Projects Philologic Results. Vol. 1 (Permission: Northern Illinois University, Illinois State Library ed.). Cedar Rapids, IA: The Torch Press.
- Koerner, Gustave (1909). McCormack, Thomas J. (ed.). Memoirs of Gustave Koerner, 1809-1896, Life-Sketches Written at the Suggestion of His Children, Volume 2 (book). Digitization Projects Philologic Results. Vol. 2 (Permission: Northern Illinois University, Illinois State Library ed.). Cedar Rapids, IA: The Torch Press.
- Koerner, Gustave (1909). McCormack, Thomas J. (ed.). Memoirs of Gustave Koerner, 1809-1896, Life-Sketches Written at the Suggestion of His Children (book, JavaScript). The Institute of Museum and Library Services through an Indiana State Library LSTA Grant. Vol. 2 (Lincoln Financial Foundation Collection ed.). Cedar Rapids, IA: The Torch Press.
- Collections of the Important General Laws of Illinois, with Comments (St. Louis, 1838) (in German)
- Körner, Gustav (1867). Aus Spanien [Out of Spain] (in German). Frankfurt a.M.: J.D. Sauerländer. OCLC 014164399.
- Körner, Gustav Philipp (1880). Das deutsche Element in den Vereinigten Staaten von Nordamerika, 1818-1848 [The German Element in the United States of America, 1818-1848]. Library of American civilization, LAC 15737 (in German and English). Cincinnati: A.E. Wilde. OCLC 011355941.

== Notes ==
Party political offices
Preceded by William McMurtry	Democratic nominee for Lieutenant Governor of Illinois; 1852	Succeeded by Richard Jones Hamilton
First	Liberal Republican nominee for Governor of Illinois; 1872	Succeeded by None
Political offices
Preceded by William McMurtry	Lieutenant Governor of Illinois; 1853–1857	Succeeded by John Wood
Diplomatic posts
Preceded by Carl Schurz	United States Minister to Spain; 4 November 1862 – 20 July 1864	Succeeded by John P. Hale
