= 1881 United States Senate election in New York =

- January 18, 1881

Majority vote of each house needed to win
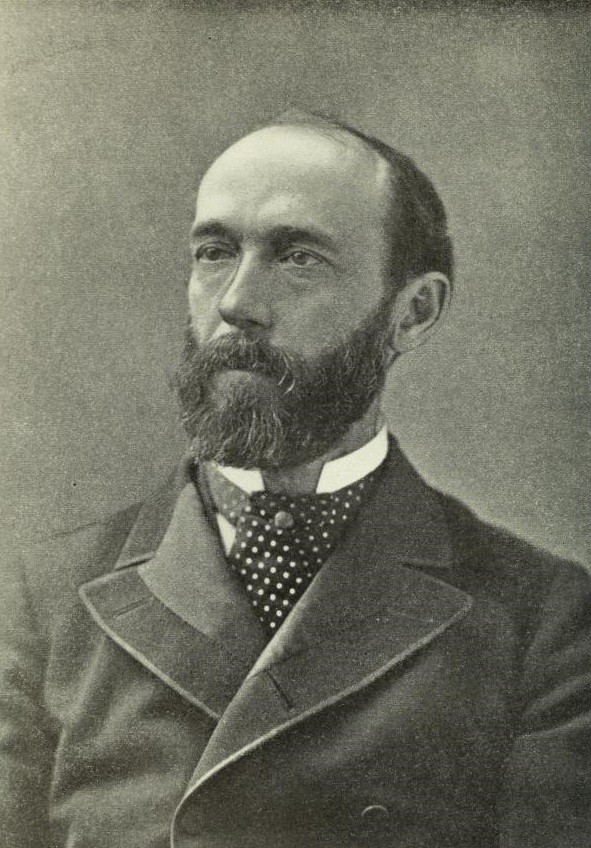

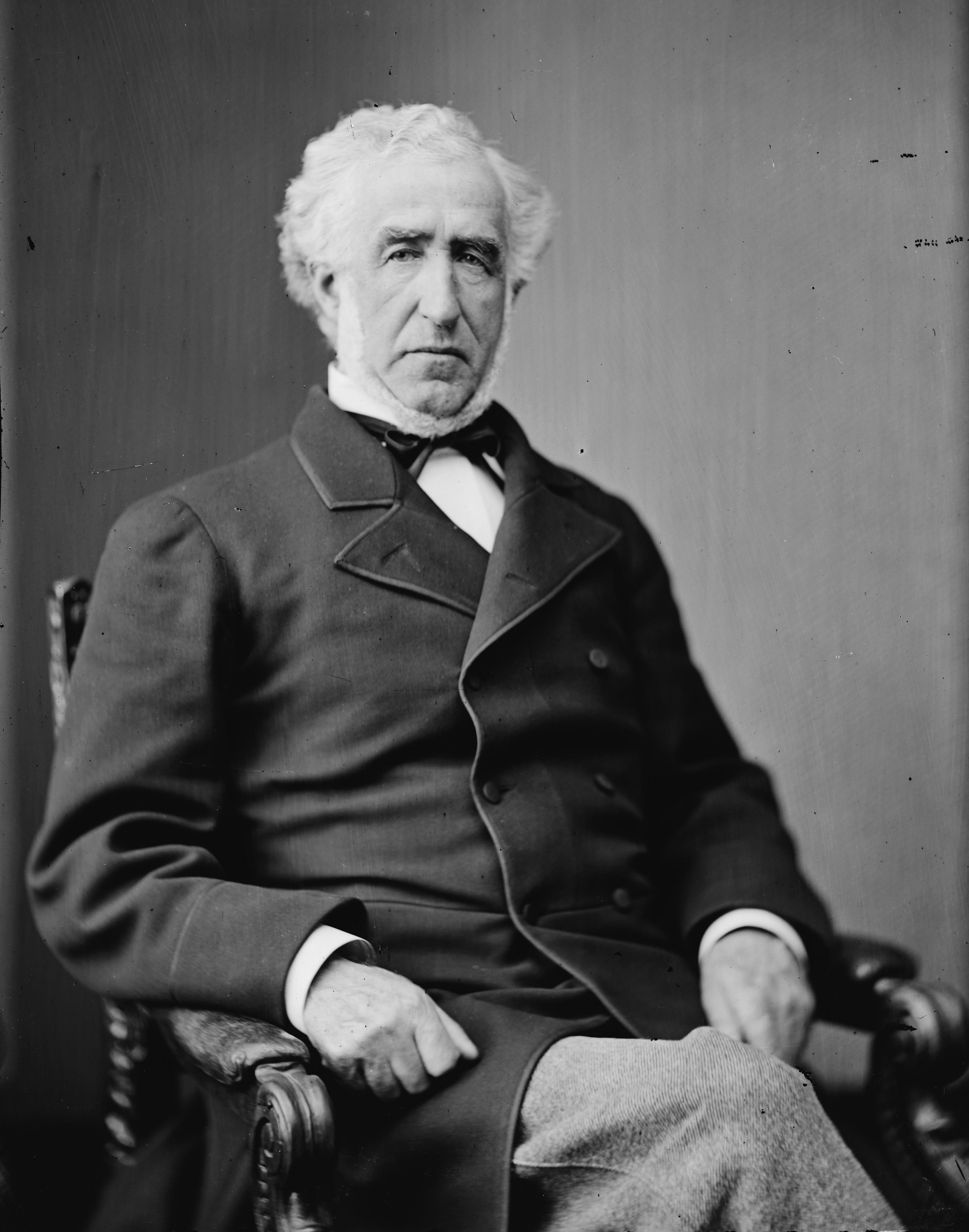
Nominee	Thomas C. Platt	Francis Kernan
Party	Republican	Democratic
Senate	25	6
Percentage	80.65%	19.35%
House	79	44
Percentage	64.23%	35.77%
Senator before election
Francis Kernan
Democratic
Elected Senator
Thomas C. Platt
Republican

The 1881 United States Senate election in New York was held on January 18, 1881, by the New York State Legislature to elect a U.S. senator (Class 1) to represent the State of New York in the United States Senate.

== Background ==
Democrat Francis Kernan had been elected in January 1875 to this seat, and his term would expire on March 3, 1881.

At the State election in November 1879, 25 Republicans and 7 Democrats were elected for a two-year term (1880–1881) in the State Senate. At the State election in November 1880, 81 Republicans and 47 Democrats were elected for the session of 1881 to the Assembly. The 104th State Legislature met from January 4, 1881, on at Albany, New York.

== Republican caucus ==
=== Candidates ===
- Richard Crowley, U.S. Representative from Lockport
- Elbridge G. Lapham, U.S. Representative from Canandaigua
- Levi P. Morton, U.S. Representative from Manhattan
- Thomas C. Platt, former U.S. Representative from Owego
- Sherman S. Rogers, former State Senator and nominee for Lieutenant Governor in 1876
- William A. Wheeler, Vice President of the United States

==== Withdrew ====
- Chauncey Depew, attorney and New York Central Railroad executive

The caucus of Republican State legislators met on January 13, State Senator Dennis McCarthy presided. All but one of the legislators were present, only State Senator Edward M. Madden (13th D.) was absent. The caucus nominated Ex-Congressman Thomas C. Platt for the U.S. Senate. Platt was a friend of the other U.S. Senator from New York, Roscoe Conkling, and belonged to the Stalwart faction. The opposing Half-Breeds (in the press sometimes referred to as the "anti-machine men") at first wanted to nominate Chauncey M. Depew, but he withdrew before balloting. The majority of the Half-Breeds, led by President pro tempore of the State Senate William H. Robertson, then supported Platt, a minority voted for Sherman S. Rogers, the defeated Republican candidate for Lieutenant Governor of New York in 1876. Congressman Richard Crowley was supported by a faction led by Speaker of the State Assembly George H. Sharpe, allied with Governor Alonzo B. Cornell. U.S. Vice President William A. Wheeler, and Congressmen Elbridge G. Lapham and Levi P. Morton also received votes.

1881 Republican caucus for United States Senator result
Office	Candidate	First ballot
U.S. Senator	Thomas C. Platt	54
	Richard Crowley	26
	Sherman S. Rogers	10
	William A. Wheeler	10
	Elbridge G. Lapham	4
	Levi P. Morton	1

== Democratic caucus ==
The caucus of the Democratic State legislators met on January 17, State Senator Charles A. Fowler (14th D.) presided. They re-nominated the incumbent U.S. Senator Francis Kernan by acclamation.

== Result ==
Thomas C. Platt was the choice of both the State Senate and the Assembly, and was declared elected.

1881 United States Senator election result
Office	House	Republican		Democrat	
U.S. Senator	State Senate (32 members)	Thomas C. Platt	25	Francis Kernan	6
	State Assembly (128 members)	Thomas C. Platt	79	Francis Kernan	44

Notes:

- The votes were cast on January 18, but both Houses met in a joint session on January 19 to compare nominations, and declare the result.
- State Senator Stevens (Dem., 22nd D.) was absent and did not vote.

== Aftermath ==
Platt remained in office for only ten weeks, until May 16, 1881, when he resigned together with his boss Roscoe Conkling in protest against the distribution of federal patronage in New York by President James A. Garfield, a Half-Breed, without being consulted, what Conkling said was a breach of a pledge given by Garfield. The confrontation between the Stalwart and the Half-Breed factions of the Republican party arose when the leader of the Half-Breeds William H. Robertson was appointed Collector of the Port of New York, the highest paying federal office in New York, a position Conkling wanted to give to one of his Stalwart friends. Conkling and Platt then tried to show their power by standing for re-election, but Elbridge G. Lapham and Warner Miller were elected instead to fill the vacancies. This effectively ended Conkling's political career, and severely harmed Platt's. However, 16 years later, in 1897, Platt was re-elected to the U.S. Senate, and served two terms.

== See also ==
- United States Senate elections, 1880 and 1881

== Sources ==
- Members of the 47th United States Congress
- SENATOR THOMAS C. PLATT; SELECTED BY THE CAUCUS UPON THE FIRST BALLOT in NYT on January 14, 1881
- COMPLIMENTING MR. KERNAN.; THE DEMOCRATIC CAUCUS RENOMINATES HIM FOR UNITED STATES SENATOR in NYT on January 18, 1881
- Election result: BUSY STATE LEGISLATORS in NYT on January 19, 1881
