= William Earnshaw (minister) =

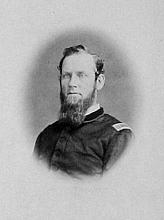
- Earnshaw circa 1865
- Born: April 12, 1828; Chester, Pennsylvania
- Died: July 7, 1885 (aged 57); Dayton, Ohio
- Burial place: Woodland Cemetery and Arboretum; Dayton, Ohio
- Military career
- Allegiance: United States of America; Union
- Branch: United States Army; Union Army
- Service years: 1861–1867
- Rank: chaplain
- Units: 49th Pennsylvania Infantry; U.S. Volunteers, Hospital Chaplain
- Conflicts: American Civil War
- Other work: 8th Commander-in-Chief, Grand Army of the Republic

William Earnshaw, D.D. (April 12, 1828 – July 7, 1885) was an American minister who served in the Union Army as a chaplain and as the 8th Commander-in-Chief of the Grand Army of the Republic, 1879–1880.

== Early life and military career ==
Earnshaw was born on April 12, 1828, in Chester, Pennsylvania. Soon after the outbreak of the Civil War, he enlisted April 16, 1861, as a private in the 49th Pennsylvania Infantry and was mustered in as the regiment's chaplain with the rank of captain. Earnshaw resigned his commission on October 12, 1862, when the regiment was consolidated with another regiment. He was appointed a hospital chaplain in the U.S. Volunteers April 22, 1863, and remained in the service until August 27, 1867.

== Post-war service ==
With the necessity of creating national cemeteries, Ernshaw was superintendent of the construction of Stones River National Cemetery and Nashville National Cemetery. He was elected chaplain of the National Military Home in Dayton, Ohio, on September 5, 1867, and held the post until illness forced him to retire.

Earnshaw was Commander of the Ohio Department, Grand Army of the Republic in 1876, Junior Vice-Commander in 1877, and presided at the national encampment of the G.A.R. in Albany, New York, in 1879, when he was elected to serve as the national organization's 8th Commander-in-Chief.

He died July 7, 1885, in Dayton, Ohio, and is buried there in Woodland Cemetery and Arboretum.

== See also ==
- List of Grand Army of the Republic commanders-in-chief

Political offices
Preceded by John C. Robinson	Commander-in-Chief of the Grand Army of the Republic; 1879–1880	Succeeded by Louis Wagner
