= Gustave Koerner House =

Historic house in Illinois, United States

- U.S. National Register of Historic Places
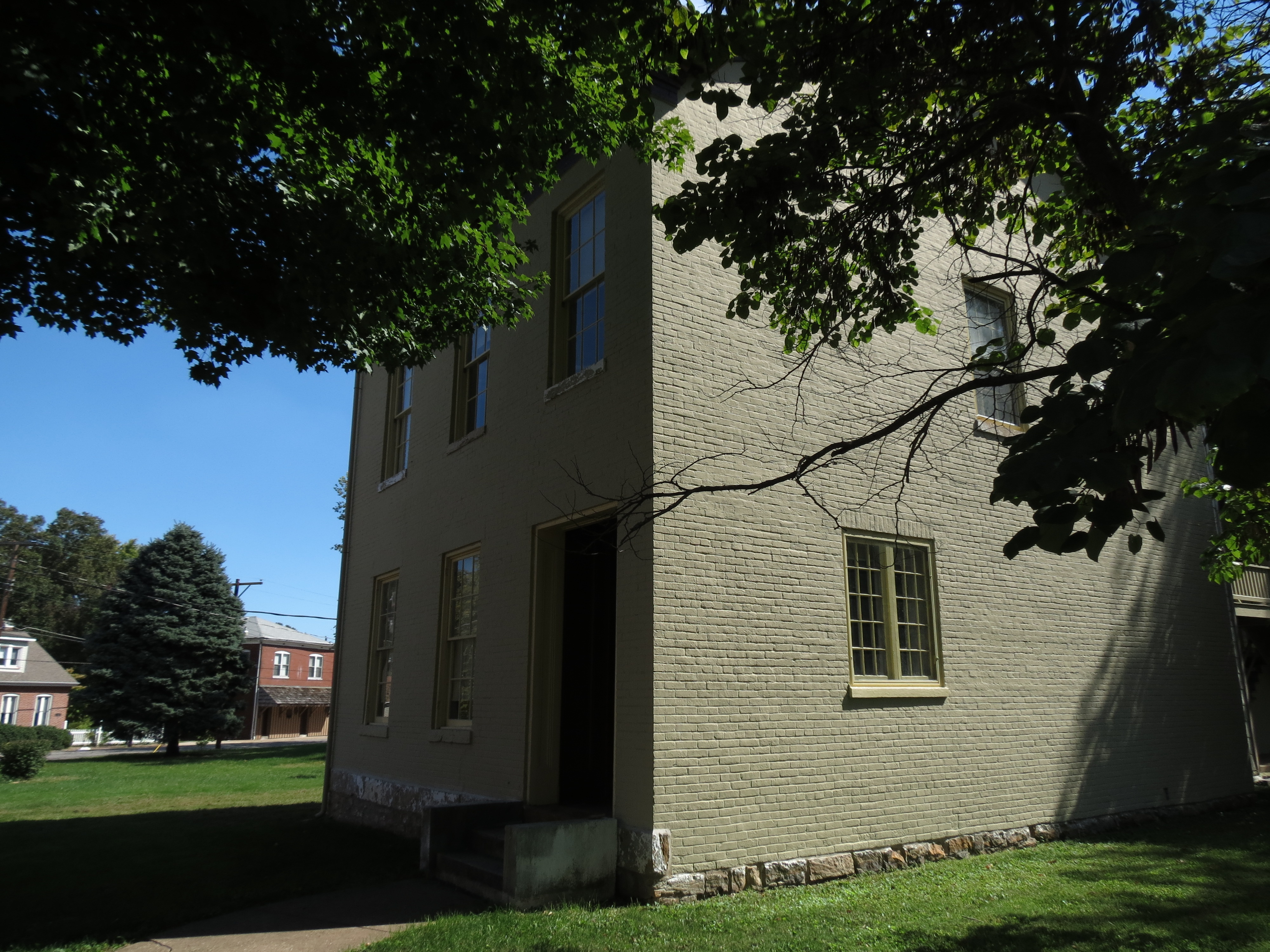
- former residential building of Gustave Koerner

- Location within Illinois
- Location: 200 Abend St., Belleville, Illinois
- Coordinates: 38°31′18″N 89°59′43″W
- Area: less than one acre
- Built: 1849, rebuilt in 1854
- Architectural style: Greek Revival
- Website: www.gustavekoerner.org
- NRHP reference No.: 04000983
- Added to NRHP: September 17, 2004

The Gustave Koerner House is a historic house located at 200 Abend Street in Belleville, Illinois.

== Built in Greek Revival style ==
The Greek Revival house was built in 1848-49 and rebuilt in 1854–55 after a fire. Gustave Koerner, a German immigrant and prominent Illinois politician, lived in the house from its construction to his death in 1896. Koerner served as Lieutenant Governor of Illinois, sat on the Illinois Supreme Court, and was a member of the Illinois House of Representatives. He was also a political ally of Abraham Lincoln during his senatorial and presidential campaigns and convinced many German-American voters to support Lincoln. During the Civil War, Koerner served as United States Minister to Spain and thereafter mounted a failed campaign for Governor of Illinois.

== Museum ==
The house was added to the National Register of Historic Places on September 17, 2004. It was converted in 1984 and separated into rental units. It is no longer used for rental units. The Koerner house is being restored to its original appearance by the Historical Society of St. Clair County, Illinois. It will be maintained as a museum.

== Literature ==
Stratton, Christopher; et al. (2010). "Historic Structure Report: Gustave Koerner House Belleville, St. Clair County, Illinois" (pdf).
