= 49th Pennsylvania Infantry Regiment =

Union Army infantry regiment

49th Pennsylvania Volunteer Infantry
- Active: September 14, 1861 – July 15, 1865
- Country: United States of America
- Allegiance: Union
- Branch: Infantry
- Engagements: Siege of Yorktown; Battle of Williamsburg; Seven Days Battles; Battle of Garnett's & Golding's Farm; Battle of Savage's Station; Battle of White Oak Swamp; Battle of Malvern Hill; Battle of South Mountain; Battle of Antietam; Battle of Fredericksburg; Battle of Chancellorsville; Battle of Gettysburg; Bristoe Campaign; Second Battle of Rappahannock Station; Mine Run Campaign; Battle of Germania Ford; Battle of the Wilderness; Battle of Spotsylvania Court House; Battle of North Anna; Battle of Cold Harbor; Siege of Petersburg; Battle of Fort Stevens; Third Battle of Winchester; Battle of Hatcher's Run; Appomattox Campaign; Third Battle of Petersburg; Battle of Sailor's Creek

The 49th Pennsylvania Volunteer Infantry was an infantry regiment that served in the Union Army during the American Civil War.

== Service ==
The 49th Pennsylvania Infantry was organized in Lewistown and Harrisburg, Pennsylvania and mustered in September 14, 1861 at Camp Curtin for a three-year enlistment under the command of Colonel William H. Irwin.

The regiment was attached to Hancock's Brigade, W. F. Smith's Division, Army of the Potomac, to March 1862. 1st Brigade, 2nd Division, IV Corps, Army of the Potomac, to May 1862. 1st Brigade, 2nd Division, VI Corps, Army of the Potomac, to February 1863. 3rd Brigade, 1st Division, VI Corps, to July 1864. 3rd Brigade, 1st Division, VI Corps, Army of the Shenandoah, to August 1864. Reserve Division, Department of West Virginia, to September 1864. 3rd Brigade, 1st Division, VI Corps, Army of the Shenandoah, to December 1864, and Army of the Potomac, to July 1865.

The 49th Pennsylvania Infantry mustered out July 15, 1865.

== Detailed service ==
Left Pennsylvania for Washington, D.C., September 22, 1861. Duty near Lewinsville, Va., defenses of Washington, D.C., until March 1862. Advance on Manassas, Va., March 10–15. Return to Alexandria and embark for the Virginia Peninsula. Siege of Yorktown April 5-May 4. Lee's Mills, Burnt Chimneys, April 16. Battle of Williamsburg May 5. Pursuit to the Chickahominy River and picket duty until June 25. Seven Days Battles before Richmond June 25-July 1. Garnett's Farm June 27. Golding's Farm June 28. Savage Station June 29. White Oak Swamp Bridge June 30. Malvern Hill July 1. At Harrison's Landing until August 16. Movement to Centreville August 16–27. In works at Centreville August 27–31. Assist in checking Pope's rout at Bull Run August 30, and cover retreat to Fairfax Court House August 31-September 1. Maryland Campaign September 6–24. Sugar Loaf Mountain September 10–11. Crampton's Pass, South Mountain, September 14. Battle of Antietam September 16–17. Duty in Maryland until October 29. Movement to Falmouth, Va., October 29-November 19. Battle of Fredericksburg December 12–15. Consolidated to four companies January 9, 1863. "Mud March" January 20–24. At White Oak Church until April 27. Chancellorsville Campaign April 27-May 6. Operations at Franklin's Crossing April 29-May 2. Bernard House April 29. Maryes Heights, Fredericksburg, May 3. Salem Heights May 3–4. Banks' Ford May 4. At White Oak Church until June 6. Deep Run Ravine June 6–13. Battle of Gettysburg, Pa., July 2–4. At and near Funkstown, Md., July 10–13. Duty on line of the Rappahannock until October. Bristoe Campaign October 9–22. Advance to line of the Rappahannock November 7–8. Rappahannock Station November 7. Mine Run Campaign November 26-December 2. Duty at Hazel River until May 1864. Rapidan Campaign May 4-June 13. Battle of the Wilderness May 5–7, Spottsylvania May 8–12, Spottsylvania Court House May 12–21. Assault on the Salient May 12. North Anna River May 23–26. On line of the Pamunkey May 26–28. Totopotomoy May 28–31. Cold Harbor May 31-June 12. Before Petersburg June 17–19. Siege of Petersburg June 17-July 9. Jerusalem Plank Road, Weldon Railroad, June 22–23. Moved to Washington, D.C., July 9–11. Repulse of Early's attack on Washington July 12–13. Pursuit of Early July 14–18. Sheridan's Shenandoah Valley Campaign August to December. Third Battle of Winchester, September 19. Guard duty at Winchester until October 29, and in the valley until December 1. Ordered to Petersburg, Va. Siege operations against Petersburg December 1864 to April 1865. Dabney's Mills, Hatcher's Run, February 5–7, 1865. Appomattox Campaign March 28-April 9. Assault on and fall of Petersburg April 2. Sailor's Creek April 6. Detached to escort prisoners April 6. March to Danville April 23–29, and duty there until May 23. Moved to Richmond, Va., then to Washington, D.C. Corps review June 8. Duty at Hall's Hill until July 15.

== Casualties ==
The regiment lost a total of 361 men during service; 9 officers and 184 enlisted men killed or mortally wounded, 168 enlisted men died of disease.

== Commanders ==
- Colonel William H. Irwin - resigned October 24, 1863
- Colonel Thomas M. Hulings - killed in action at the Battle of Spotsylvania Court House
- Lieutenant Colonel William Brisbane - commanded at the Battle of Antietam
- Lieutenant Colonel Baynton J. Hickman - commanded at the Third Battle of Winchester

== Notable members ==
- Captain William Earnshaw, regimental chaplain - 8th Commander-in-Chief, Grand Army of the Republic (1879-1880)
- Drummer Charles Edwin King, Company F - mortally wounded in action at the Battle of Antietam; youngest-documented soldier to be killed during the Civil War

== See also ==
- List of Pennsylvania Civil War Units
- Pennsylvania in the Civil War
