= Heinrich A. Rattermann House =

Historic house in Ohio, United States

- U.S. National Register of Historic Places
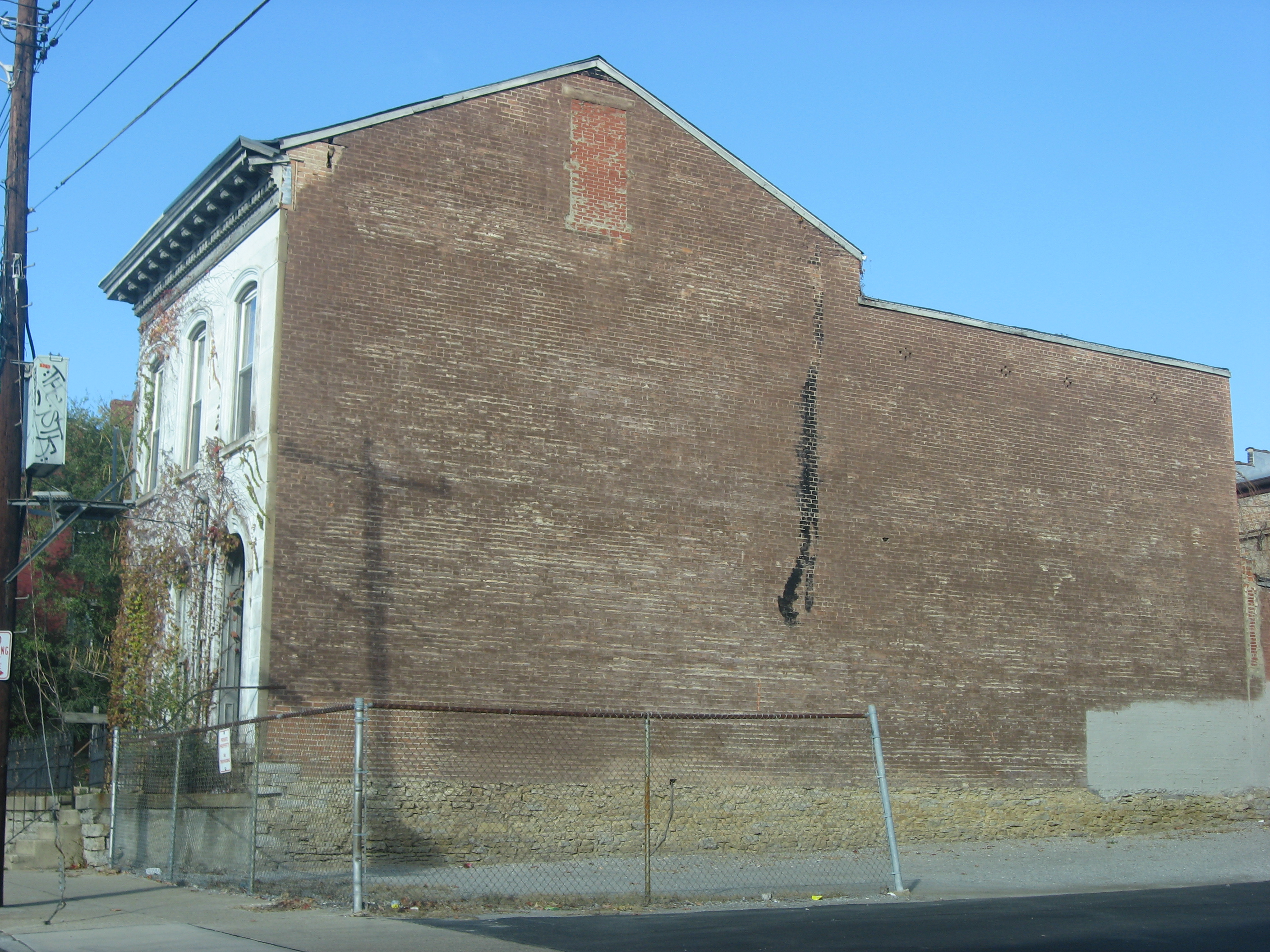
- Site of the house, with a neighboring building behind

- Location within Ohio Location within the United States
- Location: 510 York St., Cincinnati, Ohio
- Coordinates: 39°7′2″N 84°31′30.6″W
- Area: Less than 1 acre (0.40 ha)
- Built: 1860
- Architectural style: Italianate
- NRHP reference No.: 80003080
- Added to NRHP: May 23, 1980

The Heinrich A. Rattermann House was a historic residence in the West End neighborhood of Cincinnati, Ohio, United States. Built in 1860, it was a brick building with a stone foundation and elements of iron and stone. It was the home of Heinrich Armin Rattermann from 1895 until his 1923 death. The most prominent German-American author in the history of the United States, Ratterman worked to solidify German-American culture; he sought to teach his compatriots their culture and produced a history of German Americans in Ohio.

Former exterior; note the prominent cornice at the top

== Heinrich A. Rattermann biography ==
Born in 1832 in Ankum in the Osnabrück Land, Rattermann and his parents moved to the United States in 1845. In the following year, they moved to Cincinnati, where he worked at a lumberyard for more than a decade before founding a fire insurance company for German-Americans. At the age of 63, he moved into a house on York Street in the West End; into the late twentieth century, this three-story residence was one of the area's best Italianate houses. Among its architectural elements was a prominent bracketed cornice around the edge of the flat roof.

== Registered historical place ==
In 1980, Rattermann's house was listed on the National Register of Historic Places, both because of its connection to Rattermann and because of its historic and well-preserved architecture. Despite its landmarked status, the house has been destroyed; the site is now an empty lot. Nevertheless, the building remains listed on the National Register.
