= Francis Kernan =

American lawyer and politician (1816–1892)

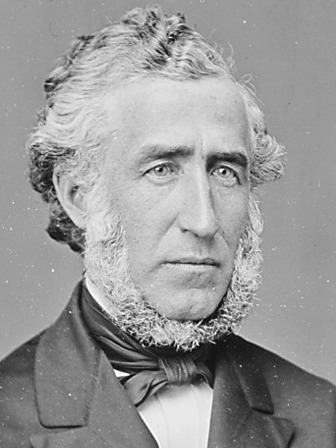
- Kernan c. 1860–1865

United States Senator from New York
- In office March 4, 1875 – March 3, 1881
- Preceded by: Reuben E. Fenton
- Succeeded by: Thomas C. Platt

Member of the U.S. House of Representatives from New York's 21st district
- In office March 4, 1863 – March 3, 1865
- Preceded by: R. Holland Duell
- Succeeded by: Roscoe Conkling

Member of the New York State Assembly from the Oneida County, 1st district
- In office January 1, 1861 – December 31, 1861
- Preceded by: James McQuade
- Succeeded by: Charles M. Scholefield

Personal details
- Born: Francis Kernan; January 14, 1816 Wayne, New York
- Died: September 7, 1892 (aged 76) Utica, New York
- Resting place: St. Agnes Cemetery, Utica, New York
- Party: Democratic
- Spouse: Hannah Avery Devereux (m. 1843)
- Children: 10
- Education: Georgetown University
- Profession: Politician, Lawyer

Francis Kernan (January 14, 1816 – September 7, 1892) was an American lawyer and politician. A resident of New York, he was active in politics as a Democrat, and served in several elected offices, including member of the New York State Assembly, member of the United States House of Representatives, and United States Senator from 1875 to 1881.

== Early life ==
Kernan was born in Wayne, New York (Note: Some sources indicate Tyrone, New York.) on January 14, 1816, the son of General William Kernan, who came to America from County Cavan, Ireland in 1800, and Rose Anna (Stubbs) Kernan, who was also a native of Ireland.

Kernan graduated from Georgetown University in 1836. He then studied law with his brother in law Edward Quinn of Watkins Glen, New York, and moved to Utica, New York, in 1839 intending to pursue a legal career. He completed his studies with Joshua A. Spencer, was admitted to the bar in July 1840, and then practiced law in partnership with Spencer as Spencer and Kernan. He later practiced in partnership with relatives as the senior partner of Kernan and Quinn, later Kernan, Quinn and Kernan. From 1854 to 1857, Kernan was Reporter of Decisions for the New York Court of Appeals.

== Career ==
Kernan was a longtime Utica school board member, and a member of the board of managers of the New York State Hospital. He also served as president of St. John's Female Orphan Asylum, co-founded in 1843 by his father-in-law, Nicholas Devereux, and Devereux's brother John. It was staffed by the Daughters of Charity from Emmitsburg, Maryland, while the Christian Brothers, ran St. Vincent's orphanage for boys.

=== State assembly ===
He was a member of the New York State Assembly (Oneida County, 1st District) in 1861, and delegate to the 1867 New York Constitutional Convention. From 1870 until his death, Kernan served on the University of the State of New York Board of Regents.

=== U.S. House ===
He was elected as a Democrat to the Thirty-eighth Congress, defeating Republican Roscoe Conkling, and served from March 4, 1863, to March 3, 1865. In Congress he rendered important service as a member of the judiciary committee. In 1864, he was defeated for re-election by Conkling. Their political differences did not interrupt a warm personal friendship. As a member of the New York Assembly and the U.S. House during the American Civil War, Kernan was a prominent War Democrat, and was thoroughly in accord with the national government in its efforts to maintain the integrity of the Union. He showed so decided a spirit of justice and moderation that he was often consulted by President Abraham Lincoln on matters pertaining to the conduct of the war. He was instrumental in having the per capita tax on emigrants declared unconstitutional. In 1871, Kernan was an ally in Samuel J. Tilden's efforts to overthrow the Tweed ring.

In 1872, he was the Democratic/Liberal Republican candidate for Governor of New York, but he was defeated by Republican John Adams Dix.

=== U.S. Senate ===
In January 1875, Kernan was elected a U.S. Senator from New York, the first Catholic senator from New York and its first Democratic senator in 24 years. He served from March 4, 1875, to March 3, 1881, alongside Roscoe Conkling. He numbered among his friends Horatio Seymour, Samuel J. Tilden, Thomas F. Bayard, Grover Cleveland, and other distinguished Americans, and his counsel and advice were often sought by them.

=== Democratic national conventions ===
At the 1876 Democratic National Convention in St. Louis, Kernan nominated Samuel J. Tilden for President. In 1880, Kernan received the honorary degree of LL.D. from Georgetown University. In January 1881, Kernan was defeated for re-election by Republican Thomas C. Platt.

=== Later career ===
After Platt's resignation in May 1881, Kernan ran again for the Senate in the following special election but was defeated by Republican Warner Miller. At the Democratic convention of 1884, held at Chicago, he was not a delegate, but he was present at the special request of the leaders of his party and was one of the most efficient advocates, outside of the convention, for the nomination of Grover Cleveland.

=== Georgetown University ===
He represented Georgetown College at the Catholic Congress of laymen at Baltimore in 1889, and delivered a memorable address on that occasion. In charity he gave much, considering his means, as he was never a very wealthy man, to his church and to charitable institutions; and his legal advice was often freely given to the clergy and to Georgetown University.

== Personal life ==
In 1843, Kernan married Hannah Avery Devereux, daughter of Nicholas Devereux of Utica, one of the principal patrons and benefactors of the Catholic Church and its charitable institutions in Central and Western New York. They were the parents of 10 children, including John Devereux, a railroad commissioner in New York.

In the rancor of politics, "...his religious views were ruthlessly assailed, but during his whole public life no breath of suspicion was ever cast on...his character or the integrity of his action, in the discharge of the high trusts confided to him." He was a great home-lover, with no fondness for the theatre, opera, or club life. He was fond of reading, of a game of cards, and was a fine conversationalist. Occasionally, but not often, he attended dinners and receptions in Washington and Utica. He often worked in his home at night over lawsuits and congressional speeches. In person he was tall, had a good figure, and an attractive, intellectual face. Without pretense or sham, he was one of nature's gentlemen. His old age was calm, genial, peaceful, and contented.

Kernan died in Utica on September 7, 1892, and was interred at St. Agnes Cemetery in Utica.

== Sources ==
=== Books ===
- Brown, Roscoe C. E.; Smith, Ray B. (1922). Political and Governmental History of the State of New York. Vol. 3. Syracuse, NY: Syracuse Press.
- Herbermann, Charles George (1916). United States Catholic Historical Society: Historical Records and Studies. Vol. 9. New York, NY: United States Catholic Historical Society.
- Hill, Frederick Simon (1910). New York State Men: Biographic Studies and Character Portraits. Vol. 2. Albany, NY: The Argus Company.
- New York State Legislature (1881). Journal of the Assembly of the State of New York. Vol. 2. Albany, NY: Weed, Parsons & Co.
- Oneida Historical Society (1905). Transactions of the Oneida Historical Society at Utica. Vol. 10–13. Utica, NY: Thomas J. Griffiths.
- Pillar, James L. (1964). The Catholic Church in Mississippi, 1837-65. New Orleans, LA: Hauser Press.

=== Magazines ===
- Watson, William H. (1894). "Memorial Address: Francis Kernan". 107th Annual Report (1893). University of the State of New York Board of Regents: Albany, NY.

== External sources ==
- United States Congress. "Francis Kernan (id: K000133)". Biographical Directory of the United States Congress.
- Francis Kernan at Find a Grave
- Kernan, Thomas (1913). "Francis Kernan" . In Herbermann, Charles (ed.). Catholic Encyclopedia. New York: Robert Appleton Company.

Party political offices
Preceded by John T. Hoffman	Democratic nominee for Governor of New York; 1872	Succeeded by Samuel J. Tilden
First	Liberal Republican nominee for Governor of New York; 1872	Succeeded by None
New York State Assembly
Preceded by James McQuade	New York State Assembly; Oneida County, 1st District; 1861	Succeeded by Charles M. Scholefield
U.S. House of Representatives
Preceded by R. Holland Duell	Member of the U.S. House of Representatives from New York's 21st congressional district 1863–1865	Succeeded by Roscoe Conkling
U.S. Senate
Preceded by Reuben E. Fenton	U.S. senator (Class 1) from New York; 1875–1881; Served alongside: Roscoe Conkling	Succeeded by Thomas C. Platt
