= 1872 Kansas gubernatorial election =

- November 5, 1872
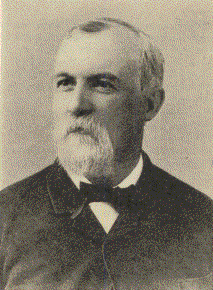

| Nominee | Thomas A. Osborn | Thaddeus H. Walker |
| Party | Republican | Liberal Republican |
| Popular vote | 66,715 | 34,698 |
| Percentage | 65.79% | 34.21% |
- County results Osborn: 50–60% 60–70% 70–80% 80–90% >90% Walker: 50–60% 60–70% No Data
Governor before election
James M. Harvey
Republican
Elected Governor
Thomas A. Osborn
Republican

The 1872 Kansas gubernatorial election was held on November 5, 1872, in order to elect the Governor of Kansas. Republican nominee and former Lieutenant Governor of Kansas Thomas A. Osborn defeated Liberal Republican nominee and real estate mogul Thaddeus H. Walker.

== General election ==
On election day, November 5, 1872, Republican nominee Thomas A. Osborn won the election by a margin of 32,017 votes against his opponent Liberal Republican nominee Thaddeus H. Walker, thereby retaining Republican control over the office of Governor. Osborn was sworn in as the 6th Governor of Kansas on January 13, 1873.

=== Results ===
Kansas gubernatorial election, 1872
| Party | Candidate | Votes | % |
|---|---|---|---|
| Republican | Thomas A. Osborn | 66,715 | 65.79 |
| Liberal Republican | Thaddeus H. Walker | 34,698 | 34.21 |
| Total votes | | 101,413 | 100.00 |
| Republican hold | | | |
