= 1872 Illinois lieutenant gubernatorial election =

- November 5, 1872
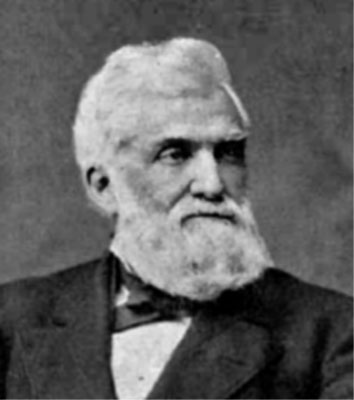

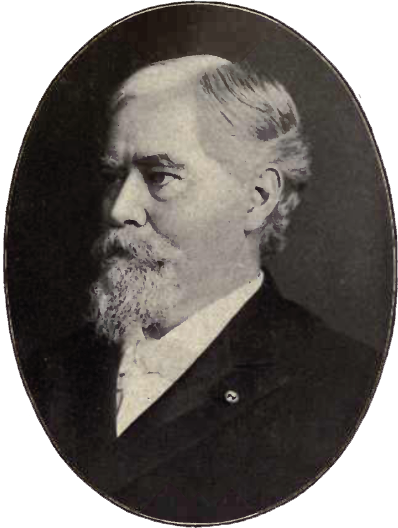
Nominee	John Lourie Beveridge	John C. Black
Party	Republican	Democratic
Popular vote	235,101	199,767
Percentage	53.76%	45.68%
Lieutenant Governor before election
John Dougherty
Republican
Elected Lieutenant Governor
John Lourie Beveridge
Republican

The 1872 Illinois lieutenant gubernatorial election was held on November 5, 1872, in order to elect the lieutenant governor of Illinois. Republican nominee and incumbent member of the U.S. House of Representatives from Illinois's 3rd district John Lourie Beveridge defeated Democratic nominee John C. Black and Independent Democrat Daniel S. Storr.

== General election ==
On election day, November 5, 1872, Republican nominee John Lourie Beveridge won the election by a margin of 35,334 votes against his foremost opponent Democratic nominee John C. Black, thereby retaining Republican control over the office of lieutenant governor. Beveridge was sworn in as the 18th lieutenant governor of Illinois on January 3, 1873.

=== Results ===
Illinois lieutenant gubernatorial election, 1872
Party	Candidate	Votes	%
Republican	John Lourie Beveridge	235,101	53.76
Democratic	John C. Black	199,767	45.68
Independent Democrat	Daniel S. Storr	2,459	0.56
Total votes		437,327	100.00
Republican hold			

== See also ==
- 1872 Illinois gubernatorial election
