= 1872 Missouri lieutenant gubernatorial election =

- November 5, 1872
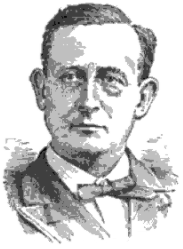

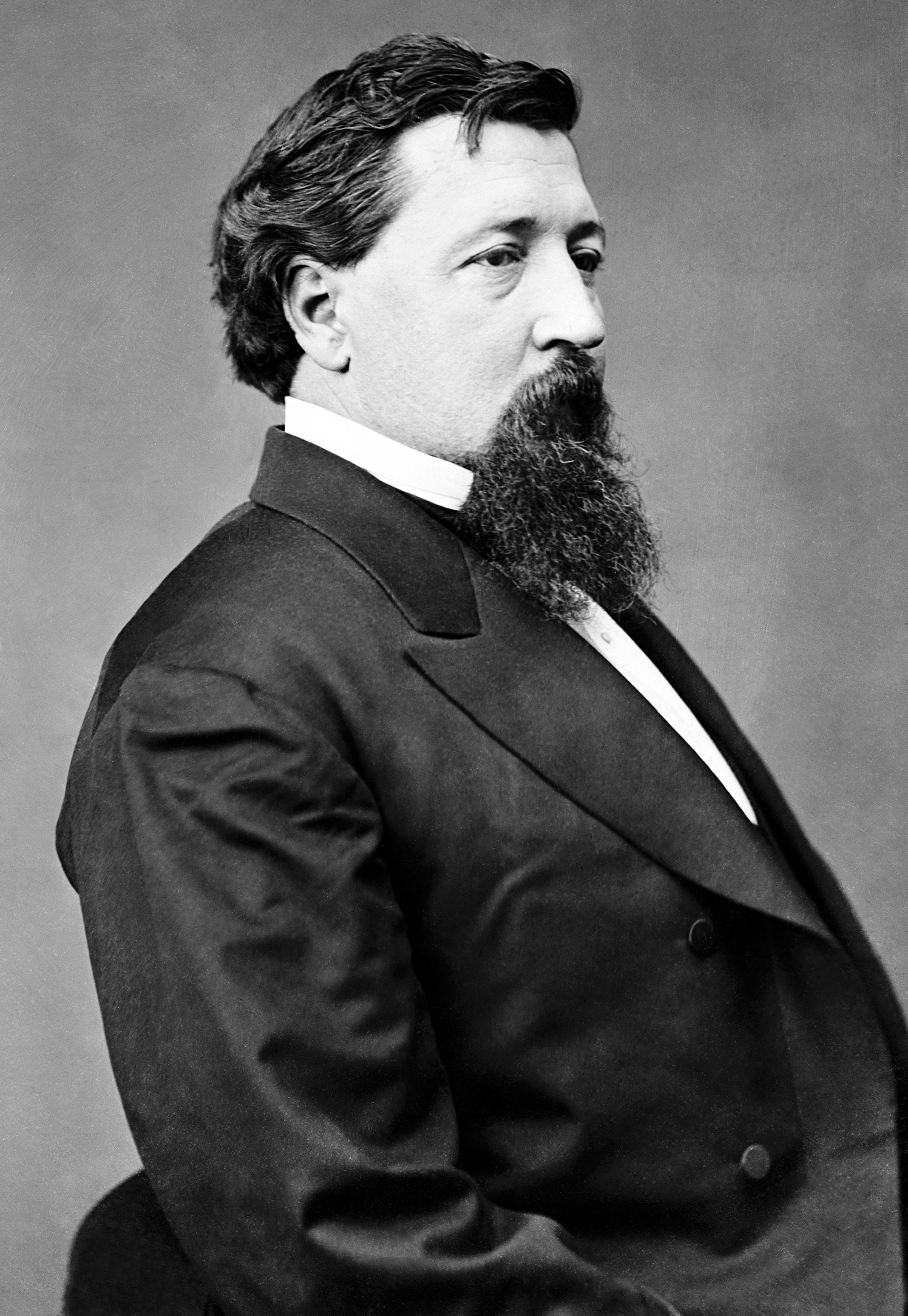
Nominee	Charles Phillip Johnson	John Hubler Stover
Party	Liberal Republican	Republican
Popular vote	157,846	120,446
Percentage	56.72%	43.28%
Lieutenant Governor before election
Joseph J. Gravely
Liberal Republican
Elected Lieutenant Governor
Charles Phillip Johnson
Liberal Republican

The 1872 Missouri lieutenant gubernatorial election was held on November 5, 1872, in order to elect the lieutenant governor of Missouri. Liberal Republican nominee Charles Phillip Johnson defeated Republican nominee and former member of the U.S. House of Representatives from Missouri's 5th district John Hubler Stover.

== General election ==
On election day, November 5, 1872, Liberal Republican nominee Charles Phillip Johnson won the election by a margin of 37,400 votes against his opponent Republican nominee John Hubler Stover, thereby retaining Liberal Republican control over the office of lieutenant governor. Johnson was sworn in as the 16th lieutenant governor of Missouri on January 8, 1873.

=== Results ===
Missouri lieutenant gubernatorial election, 1872
Party	Candidate	Votes	%
Liberal Republican	Charles Phillip Johnson	157,846	56.72
Republican	John Hubler Stover	120,446	43.28
Total votes		278,292	100.00
Liberal Republican hold			

== See also ==
- 1872 Missouri gubernatorial election
