= 1872 Rhode Island gubernatorial election =

- April 3, 1872
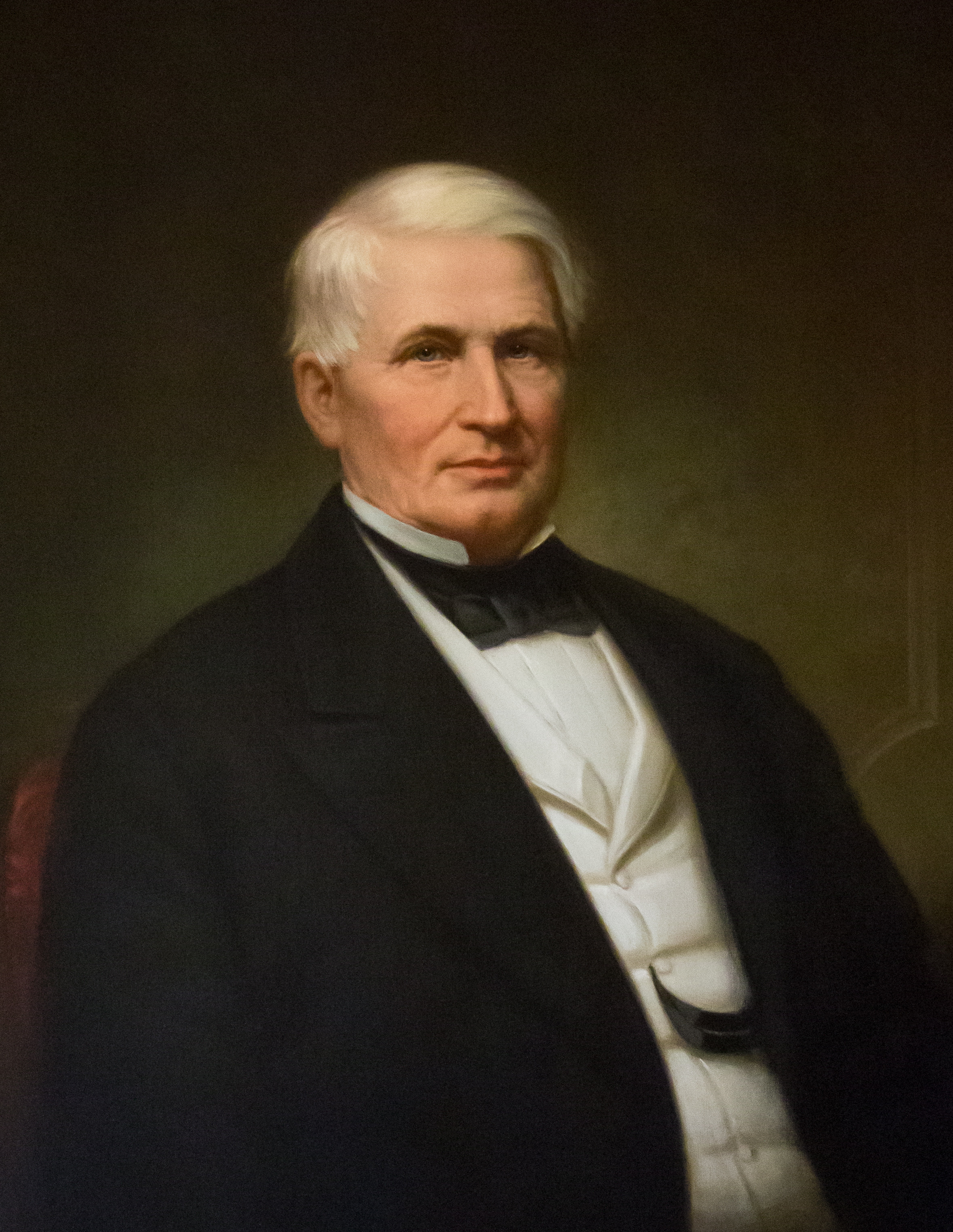
Nominee	Seth Padelford	Olney Arnold
Party	Republican	Democratic
Popular vote	9,463	8,308
Percentage	53.25%	46.75%
- County results Padelford: 50–60% 60–70% Arnold: 50–60% Tie: 50%
Governor before election
Seth Padelford
Republican
Elected Governor
Seth Padelford
Republican

The 1872 Rhode Island gubernatorial election took place on April 3, 1872, in order to elect the governor of Rhode Island. Republican candidate and incumbent governor Seth Padelford won his fourth and final one-year term as governor against Democratic candidate Olney Arnold.

== Candidates ==
=== Republican Party ===
- Seth Padelford, the Republican nominee, was the incumbent governor. He had previously served in the Rhode Island House of Representatives for two years, ran and lost in the 1860 Rhode Island gubernatorial election as the Republican nominee, and was the lieutenant governor of Rhode Island from 1863 to 1865 under James Y. Smith.

=== Democratic Party ===
- Olney Arnold (not to be confused with Olney Arnold), the Democratic nominee, was a prominent banker in Rhode Island. Under Governor William Sprague IV, he organized companies of the Rhode Island Militia for the American Civil War, and was promoted to major general. He was well-regarded by the veterans of the state for his service.

== Election ==
=== Statewide ===
1872 Rhode Island gubernatorial election
Party	Candidate	Votes	%
Republican	Seth Padelford	9,463	53.25
Democratic	Olney Arnold	8,308	46.75
Total votes		17,771	100.00
Republican hold			
