= 1872 Illinois gubernatorial election =

- November 5, 1872
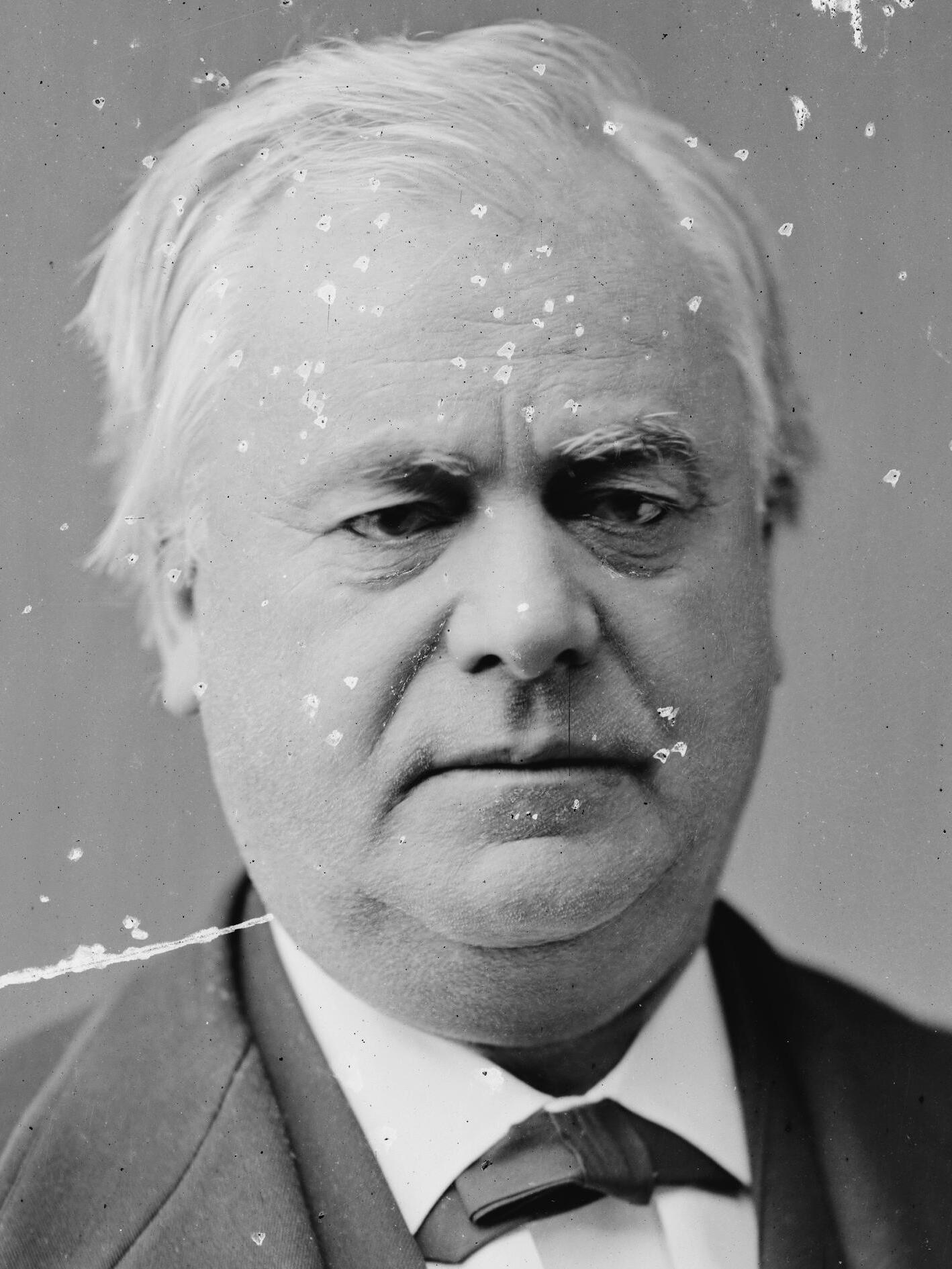

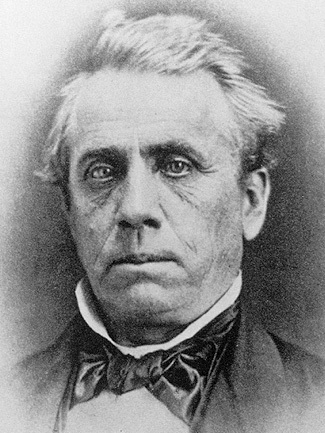
Nominee	Richard J. Oglesby	Gustav Koerner
Party	Republican	Liberal Republican
Alliance		Democratic
Popular vote	237,774	197,084
Percentage	54.41%	45.10%
- County results Oglesby: 40–50% 50–60% 60–70% 70–80% 80–90% Koerner: 50–60% 60–70% 80–90%
Governor before election
John M. Palmer
Republican
Elected Governor
Richard J. Oglesby
Republican

The 1872 Illinois gubernatorial election was held on November 5, 1872. Republican former governor Richard J. Oglesby defeated Gustav Koerner. Oglesby had agreed to run for governor but to resign upon his inauguration so that lieutenant governor John Lourie Beveridge could assume office, and Oglesby was in turn appointed to the United States Senate.

== General election ==
=== Candidates ===
- Gustav Koerner, former lieutenant governor and U.S. minister to Spain (Liberal Republican and Democratic)
- Richard J. Oglesby, former governor of Illinois (Republican)
- B. G. Wright (Independent Democratic)

=== Results ===
1872 gubernatorial election, Illinois
Party	Candidate	Votes	%	±%
Republican	Richard J. Oglesby	237,774	54.41%	−1.16%
Liberal Republican	Gustavus Koerner	197,084	45.10%	N/A%
Independent	B. G. Wright	2,185	0.50%	N/A
Majority		40,690	9.31%	−1.83%
Turnout		437,043		
Republican hold		Swing		

== See also ==
- 1872 Illinois lieutenant gubernatorial election
