= William Black (soldier) =

American Civil War soldier

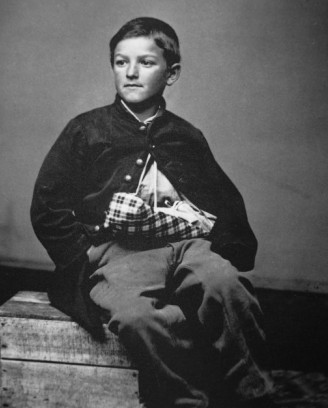
- Black in a 1911 publication
- Occupation: Soldier
- Known for: The youngest wounded soldier of the American Civil War
- Military career
- Allegiance: United States
- Branch: Union Army
- Conflicts: American Civil War

William Black was a Union soldier during the American Civil War. At 12 years old, his left hand and arm were shattered by an exploding shell. He is considered to be the youngest wounded soldier of the war.
