= 1872 New York state election =

- November 5, 1872

The 1872 New York state election was held on November 5, 1872, to elect the governor, the lieutenant governor, a Canal Commissioner, an Inspector of State Prisons and a U.S. Representative-at-large, as well as all members of the New York State Assembly.

== History ==
The Republican state convention met on August 21 at Utica, New York. William A. Wheeler was president. John Adams Dix was nominated for governor by acclamation. John C. Robinson was nominated for lieutenant governor, Lyman Tremain for U.S. Representative-at-large, Reuben W. Stroud for Canal Commissioner and Ezra Graves for Prison Inspector.

The Democratic state convention met on September 4 at Wieting Hall in Syracuse, New York. Lester B. Faulkner was temporary chairman until George M. Beebe was elected as president. The Liberal Republican state conventions met on the same day at Shakespeare Hall in Syracuse, New York. Reuben E. Fenton and John Cochrane were the most influential delegates. Truman G. Younglove was temporary chairman. DeWitt C. Littlejohn was to be president, but had not arrived. During the day, haggling with the Democratic delegates about the state ticket continued, then the convention adjourned. On September 5, the conference committees of both conventions agreed upon a division of the slate, and the Democrats proceeded to nominate Francis Kernan for governor in the middle of taking a second ballot (on the first ballot, Sanford E. Church had received 15 to 20 votes), and John F. Hubbard Jr. for Canal Commissioner. The Liberal Republicans then nominated Chauncey M. Depew for lieutenant governor by acclamation.

== Result ==
The whole Republican ticket was elected. None of the incumbents ran for re-election.

A large Republican majority was elected to the State Assembly for 1873.

1872 state election results
Office	Republican ticket		Democratic/Liberal Republican ticket	
Governor	John Adams Dix	445,801	Francis Kernan	392,350
Lieutenant Governor	John C. Robinson	443,775	Chauncey M. Depew	396,181
Canal Commissioner	Reuben W. Stroud	443,555	John F. Hubbard Jr.	397,737
Inspector of State Prisons	Ezra Graves	443,668	Enos C. Brooks	397,350
U.S. Representative-at-large	Lyman Tremain	437,941	Sunset Cox	399,580

== See also ==
- New York gubernatorial elections

== Sources ==
- Results: THE STATE ELECTION in NYT on November 27, 1872. (Subscription required)
- Results: The Tribune Almanac 1873
