= Thaddeus Stevens Clarkson =

American army officer (1840–1915)

- Clarkson, c. 1896
- Born: April 26, 1840; Gettysburg, Pennsylvania
- Died: January 16, 1915 (aged 74); Newberg, Oregon
- Burial place: Prospect Hill Cemetery, Omaha, Nebraska
- Military career
- Allegiance: United States (Union}
- Branch: United States Army; Union Army
- Service years: 1861–1864
- Rank: Major
- Units: Smith's Independent Illinois Light Artillery; Battery A, 1st Illinois Light Artillery; 13th Illinois Cavalry; 3rd Arkansas Cavalry
- Conflicts: American Civil War
- Other work: 25th Commander-in-Chief of the Grand Army of the Republic, city postmaster

Thaddeus Stevens Clarkson (April 26, 1840 – January 16, 1915) was an American soldier who served in the Union Army during the American Civil War and as the 25th Commander-in-Chief of the Grand Army of the Republic from 1896 to 1897.

== Early life and education ==
Clarkson was born April 26, 1840, in Gettysburg, Pennsylvania to Michael Cooke (1800 – 1871) and Louisa Clarkson (née Harper) (1805 – 1875). He was educated at St. James College in Hagerstown, Maryland. He moved with his family to Chicago, Illinois in 1857. In 1862, Clarkson married Mary Beecher Matteson; they had five children. In 1833, Clarkson's father, an enterprising Gettysburg businessman, purchased a tract of land along the Chambersburg Pike, and built a stone house that in 1863 was used as headquarters of General Robert E. Lee during the Battle of Gettysburg. Clarkson's father found himself in financial difficulty and the house was sold at a sheriff's auction in 1846 to Thaddeus Stevens. Michael Clarkson and Stevens were close friends and Stevens wrote a letter to President Abraham Lincoln on February 9, 1863, recommending a commission for Thaddeus to a commission in the Regular Army; the commission was apparently never granted as Thaddeus remained an officer in the volunteer service.

== Military career ==
On April 16, 1861, Clarkson enlisted at Chicago as a private in Smith's Independent Illinois Light Artillery. He was promoted to corporal on May 2, 1861, and to sergeant on July 16, 1861; he mustered out with the battery on the same date. The battery was reorganized and he reenlisted the same day as a private in Battery A, 1st Illinois Light Artillery and mustered out November 27, 1861 at Pilot Knob, Missouri.

Clarkson subsequently transferred to the 13th Illinois Cavalry on December 31, 1861, to accept a commission as a first lieutenant, where he was assigned to serve as adjutant for the regiment. Clarkson was then appointed to the staff of Brig. Gen. John W. Davidson. He rose through the ranks and was promoted to major on December 14, 1863, the same day that he was mustered out of the regiment. The following day, he began service with the 3rd Arkansas Cavalry, a regiment he helped raise and commanded until the end of the war. He mustered out of the service on September 10, 1864.

== Post-war ==
In March 1866 Clarkson settled in Nebraska with his family and became postmaster in Omaha. He became active with the G.A.R., serving as Commander of the Department of Nebraska in 1890, Junior Vice Commander-in-Chief of the G.A.R. in 1892, and finally as Commander-in-Chief of the G.A.R. from 1896 to 1897. He was elected May 23, 1898 as general manager of the Trans-Mississippi International Exposition.

Clarkson died January 16, 1915, in Newberg, Oregon. He is buried in Omaha at Prospect Hill Cemetery, where his headstone is missing.

== See also ==
- List of Grand Army of the Republic commanders-in-chief

Political offices
Preceded by Ivan N. Walker	Commander-in-Chief of the Grand Army of the Republic; 1896 – 1897	Succeeded by John P. S. Gobin
