= 8th United States Colored Infantry Regiment =

Union Army infantry regiment

8th United States Colored Infantry
- Active: September 22, 1863, to December 12, 1865
- Country: United States
- Allegiance: Union
- Branch: Infantry
- Engagements: Battle of Olustee; Siege of Petersburg; Battle of Chaffin's Farm; Second Battle of Deep Bottom; Battle of Darbytown Road; Battle of Fair Oaks & Darbytown Road; Appomattox Campaign

The 8th United States Colored Infantry was an infantry regiment that served in the Union Army during the American Civil War. The regiment was composed of African American enlisted men commanded by white officers and was authorized by the Bureau of Colored Troops which was created by the United States War Department on May 22, 1863.

== Service ==
The 8th U.S. Colored Infantry was organized at Camp William Penn in Philadelphia, Pennsylvania, beginning September 22, 1863, and mustered on December 4, 1863, under the command of Colonel Charles W. Fribley.

The regiment was attached to Howell's Brigade, District of Hilton Head, South Carolina, Department of the South, to February 1864. Hawley's Brigade, Seymour's Division, District of Florida, Department of the South, to April 1864. District of Florida, Department of the South, to August 1864. 1st Brigade, 3rd Division, X Corps, Army of the James, Department of Virginia and North Carolina, to December 1864. 2nd Brigade, 2nd Division, XXV Corps, to April 1865. 1st Brigade, 2nd Division, XXV Corps, and Department of Texas, to November 1865.

The 8th U.S. Colored Infantry mustered out of service November 10, 1865, and was discharged December 12, 1865, at Philadelphia.

== Detailed service ==
- Left Philadelphia for Hilton Head, S.C., January 16, 1864.
- Expedition from Hilton Head, S.C., to Jacksonville, Fla., February 5–6, 1864.
- Occupation of Jacksonville February 7.
- Advance into Florida February 8–20.
- Camp Finnegan February 8.
- Battle of Olustee February 20.
- Retreat to Jacksonville and duty there until April.
- Moved to St. John's Bluff April 17 until August.
- Raid on Baldwin July 23–28.
- Moved to Deep Bottom, Va., August 4–12.
- Action at Deep Bottom August 12.
- Duty at Deep Bottom and in trenches before Petersburg until September 27.
- Battle of Chaffin's Farm, New Market Heights, September 28–30.
- Fort Harrison September 29.
- Darbytown Road October 13.
- Battle of Fair Oaks October 27–28.
- In trenches before Richmond until March 27, 1865.
- Appomattox Campaign March 28–April 9.
- Battle of Hatcher's Run March 29–31.
- Fall of Petersburg April 2.
- Pursuit of Lee April 3–9.
- Appomattox Court House April 9.
- Surrender of Lee and his army.
- Moved to Petersburg April 11, and duty there until May 24.
- Sailed from City Point for Texas May 24.
- Duty at Ringgold Barracks and on the Rio Grande, Texas, until November 1865.
- Moved to Philadelphia, Pa., November 10–December 3.

== Casualties ==
The regiment lost a total of 251 men during service; 4 officers and 115 enlisted men killed or mortally wounded, 132 enlisted men died of disease.

== Commanders ==
- Colonel Charles W. Fribley
- Colonel Samuel Chapman Armstrong

== Notable members ==
- Lieutenant Colonel Robert Burns Beath - 12th Commander-in-Chief of the Grand Army of the Republic, 1883–1884
- 1st Lieutenant Oliver Wilcox Norton, Company K - author and bugler who helped compose Taps

== See also ==
- List of United States Colored Troops Civil War Units
- United States Colored Troops
