= 68th Illinois Infantry Regiment =

68th Regiment Illinois Volunteer Infantry
- Illinois state flag
- Active: June 16, 1862, to September 27, 1862
- Country: United States
- Allegiance: Union
- Branch: Infantry
- Engagements: None

The 68th Regiment Illinois Volunteer Infantry was an infantry regiment that served in the Union Army during the American Civil War.

== Service ==
The 68th Illinois Infantry was organized at Camp Butler, Illinois and mustered into Federal service on June 16, 1862, for a term of three months. It served garrisons in the Alexandria, Virginia, area.

The regiment was mustered out on September 27, 1862.

== Total strength and casualties ==
The regiment suffered 25 enlisted men who died of disease, for a total of 25 fatalities.

== Commanders ==
- Colonel Elias Stewart - mustered out with the regiment.

== Notable members ==
- Pvt Paul Vandervoort, Company G - 11th Commander-in-Chief of the Grand Army of the Republic, 1882-1883
- Pvt Benjamin F. Funk, Company G - Mayor of Bloomington, Illinois, 1871-1876, 1884-1886; United States Representative, 1893-1895

== See also ==
- List of Illinois Civil War Units
- Illinois in the American Civil War
