= William John =

William John or Will John may refer to:

- William John (Medal of Honor) (1844–1927), American Civil War soldier and Medal of Honor recipient
- William Goscombe John (1860–1952), Welsh sculptor
- Will John (politician) (William John, 1878–1955), Welsh Labour Party Member of Parliament for Rhondda West 1920–1955
- William M. John (1888–1962), American writer
- Will John (born 1985), American soccer player
- William John Allen, Canadian politician
