= 19th Illinois Infantry Regiment =

19th Regiment Illinois Volunteer Infantry
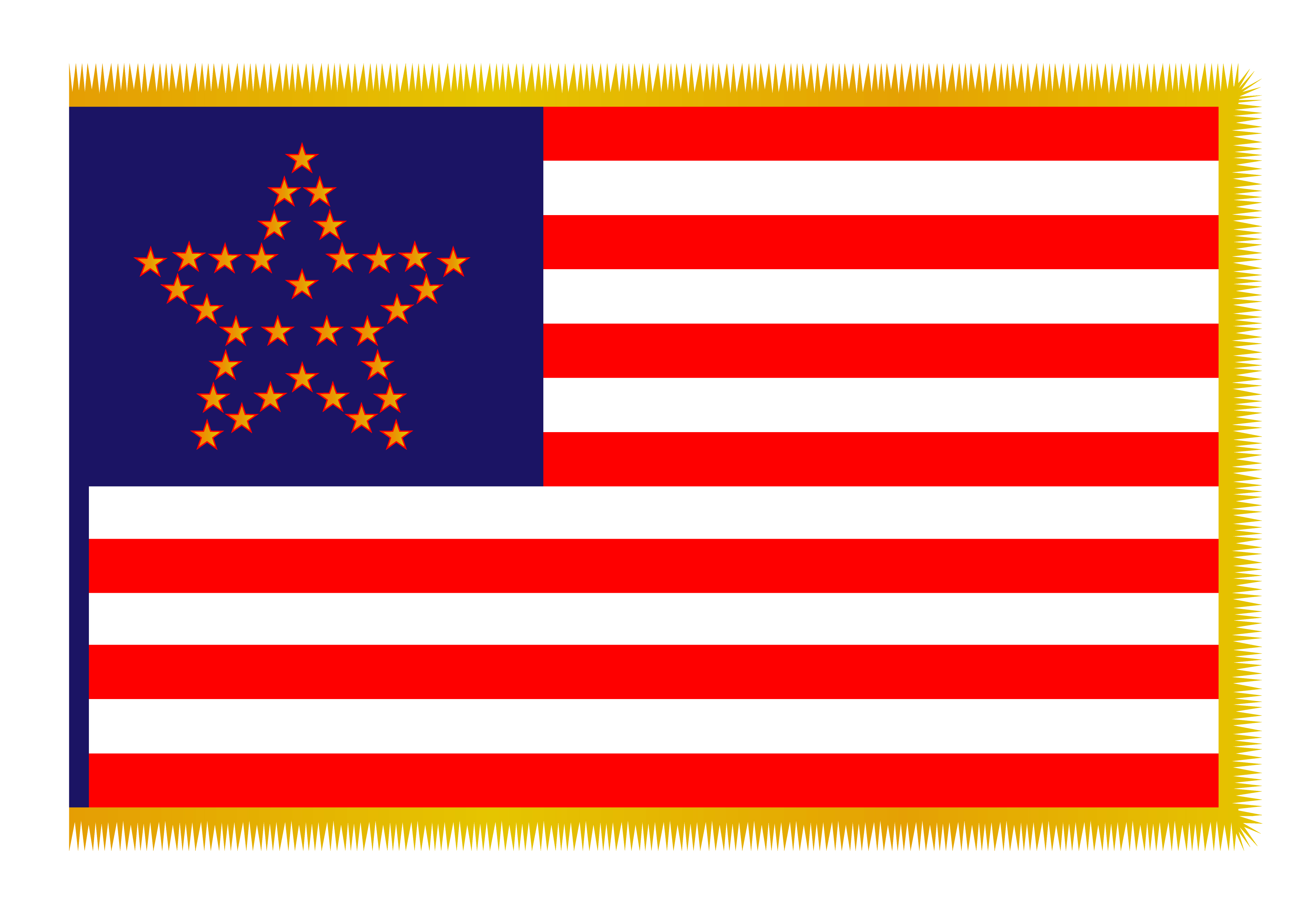
- 19th Illinois Infantry - National flag
- Active: June 17, 1861, to July 9, 1864
- Country: United States
- Allegiance: Union
- Branch: Infantry
- Engagements: American Civil War; Battle of Stones River; Battle of Chickamauga; Battle of Missionary Ridge; Battle of Resaca; Atlanta Campaign

Commanders
- Notable commanders: John B. Turchin

The 19th Regiment Illinois Volunteer Infantry was an infantry regiment that served in the Union Army during the American Civil War. Three companies formerly with Col. Elmer Ellsworth's Zouave Cadets wore a zouave uniform consisting of a dark blue zouave jacket with red trimmings, red pants, leather gaiters, a sky blue shirt, red sash, and a red French styled kepi with a dark blue band. The jacket cuffs were trimmed in yellow-orange and red. Brass buttons went down both fronts of the jacket. They were organized into four separate companies on May 4, 1861, in Chicago. It was consolidated and mustered into Federal service as the 19th Illinois Volunteer Infantry on June 17, 1861. It was mustered out at Chicago on July 9, 1864.

== History of the nineteenth ==
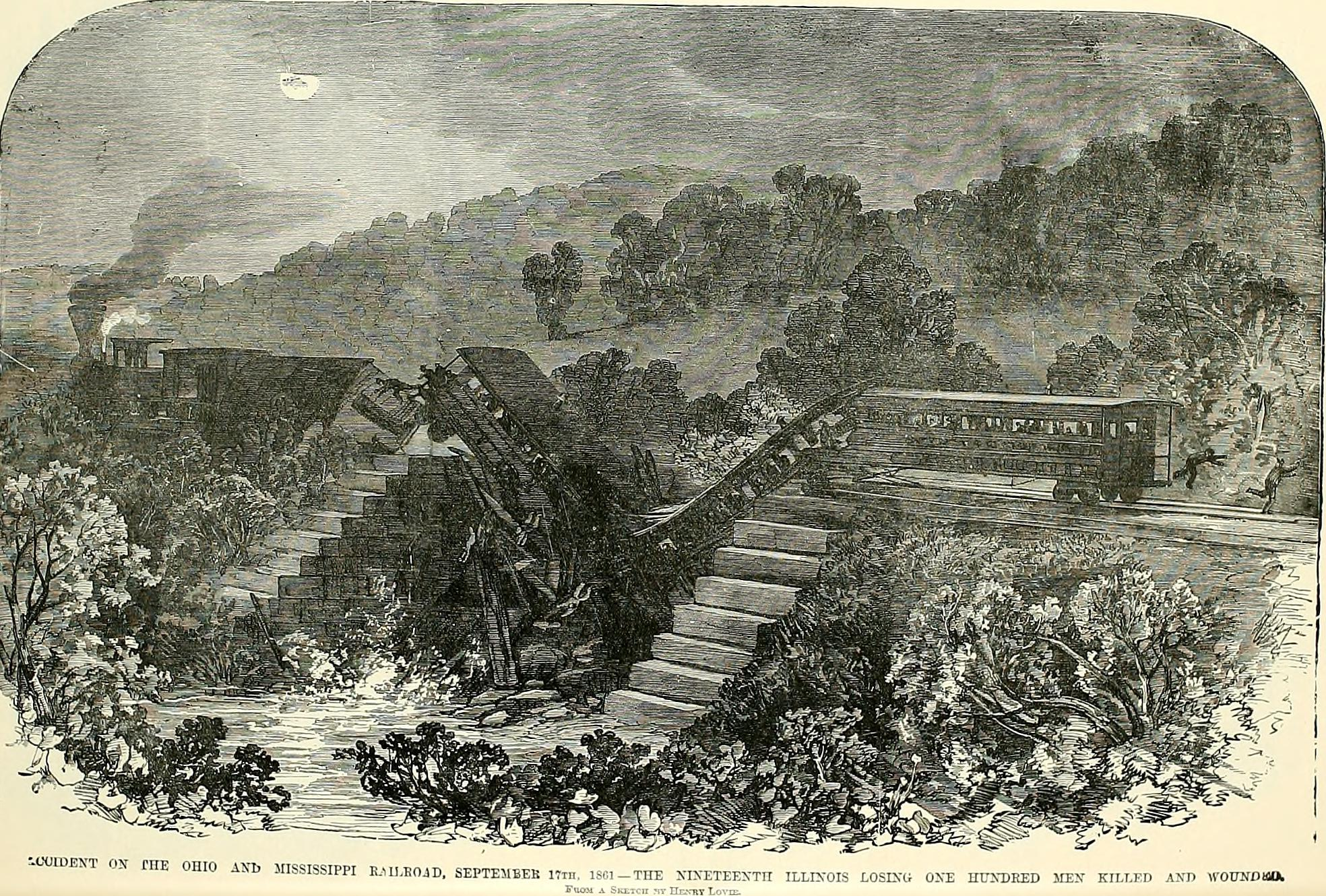
The 19th lost a hundred men in this Sept 1861 railroad accident

On May 2, 1861, the Illinois State Legislature authorized the "acceptance for State service of ten regiments of infantry," one cavalry regiment and one light artillery battalion. The act provided that "one such regiments be raised out of volunteer companies then at Springfield, as the regiment from the state at large, and one regiment from each of the nine congressional districts." On May 4, 1861, the regiment from the State at large was mustered into service at Camp Yates. By June 3, it was ordered to Chicago where it became the core of the regiment. It was eventually mustered into United States service for three years and on June 17, 1861, it became the 19th Illinois Volunteer Infantry Regiment. The nineteenth has been revered as "a solid and expert Zouave regiment" which, until the battle of Chickamauga was remembered for its charge at Stone's River.

== Companies and Counties ==
- Company A - Cook County (Chicago Zouaves)
- Company B - Stark County
- Company C - Lake County
- Company D - Cook County
- Company E - Cook County
- Company F - Carroll County
- Company G - Cook County (Bridge's Battery)
- Company H - Rock Island County
- Company I - Cook County
- Company K - Cook County (Chicago Zouaves)

== Major Campaigns and battles ==
The 19th Illinois Volunteer Infantry Regiment served at:

- Chattanooga - At Chattanooga, it was described to have been the most strategic city to capture.
- Tennessee 1862
- Alabama 1862
- Murfreesborough
- Chickamagua
- Atlanta

== Service ==
The 19th Illinois Infantry was organized at Chicago, Illinois and mustered into federal service on June 17, 1861, for a three-year enlistment.

The regiment was mustered out of service on July 9, 1864, at its expiration of enlistment.

== Total strength and casualties ==
The regiment suffered 4 officers and 60 enlisted men who were killed in action or who died of their wounds and 4 officers and 101 enlisted men who died of disease, for a total of 169 fatalities.

== Commanders ==
- Colonel John B. Turchin - promoted to brigadier general on July 7, 1862. Colonel Turchin, a former Colonel in the Russian Guards, focused on the drill and discipline of the regiment. At Camp Long, he drilled the troops to the limit, to make the Regiment as effective as possible for service. He was finally successful "in making the Nineteenth Illinois one of the best drilled Regiments in the western armies."
- Colonel Joseph R. Scott - died July 8, 1863, from wounds received at the Battle of Stones River.
- Lieutenant Colonel Alexander W. Raffin - mustered out with the regiment.
- Captain David Francis Bremner - (Commander of Company E) Bremner's overcoat was pierced by no fewer than fourteen bullets during the battle of Missionary Ridge, as he picked up fallen colors and planted the first flag on Confederate works

== Notable members ==
- 2nd Lieutenant Thomas G. Lawler, Company E - 23rd Commander-in-Chief of the Grand Army of the Republic, 1894–1895.
- J. Henry Haynie, Company D - Author of "Paris Past and Present," "The Captains and the Kings," "Chevalier in the Legion d'Hooneur of France."

== See also ==
- List of Illinois Civil War Units
- Illinois in the American Civil War
