= 156th Regiment =

156th Regiment may refer to:

- 156th Anti-aircraft Missile Regiment
- 156th Infantry Regiment (United States)

== American Civil War regiments ==
- 156th Illinois Infantry Regiment
- 156th Indiana Infantry Regiment
- 156th New York Infantry Regiment
- 156th Ohio Infantry Regiment

== See also ==
- 156th Division (disambiguation)
