= Joseph Hanks (disambiguation) =

Joseph Hanks was the great-grandfather of Abraham Lincoln.

Joseph or Joe Hanks may also refer to:

- Joseph Hanks (Medal of Honor) (1843–1922), Union Army soldier and Medal of Honor recipient
- Joe Hanks (born 1983), American boxer
- Joe Hanks (footballer) (born 1995), English footballer
