= Eugene Beauharnais Payne =

American politician

- Lt. Col Eugene Beauharnais Payne, 37th Illinois Infantry
- Born: 15 April 1835; Seneca Falls, New York, US
- Died: 6 April 1910 (aged 74); Washington, District of Columbia, US
- Burial place: Arlington National Cemetery
- Military career
- Allegiance: United States of America; Union
- Branch: United States Army; Union Army
- Service years: 1861–1866
- Rank: Lieutenant Colonel; Bvt. Brigadier General
- Units: Company H, Waukegan Zouaves; 37th Illinois Volunteer Infantry
- Conflicts: American Civil War; Pea Ridge; Battle of Prairie Grove; Siege of Vicksburg; Red River Campaign
- Other work: Illinois House of Representatives

Eugene Beauharnais Payne (15 April 1835 – 6 April 1910) was a brevet brigadier general of the Union Army in the American Civil War and an Illinois State Representative.

== Early life ==
Eugene was born on April 15, 1835, in Seneca Falls, New York; Payne was possibly named for Napoleon Bonaparte's stepson General Eugène de Beauharnais. Eugene's father, Thomas Hubbard Payne moved to Chicago, arriving there at the time of its incorporation in 1836. Unsatisfied with Chicago, he bought a tract of land in Lake County, Illinois and settled there with his family in 1837, working in the tree importation and nursery business. The Governor of Illinois appointed him one of the three commissioners to govern McHenry County. After the creation of Lake County Thomas Payne was elected County Commissioner for several terms, and was one of the three County Commissioners to locate to the county seat at Waukegan.

Eugene graduated from the Waukegan Academy and entered the first class of the Law Department of Northwestern University, graduating in 1860 with the degree of Bachelor of Laws. He was admitted to the Bar the same year.

== Civil War service ==
Following President Lincoln's call for volunteers on April 15, 1861, Illinois was ordered to provide six regiments of soldiers organised into the First Brigade Illinois Volunteers. On April 16, 1861, Waukegan's second mayor, David Ballentine called public meetings at the Lake County Courthouse in response to Lincoln's request for soldiers to fight. A sufficient number volunteered to form a company, who named themselves Company H, Waukegan Zouaves, a company of 85 men; Waukegan provided 53 of the 85 men. The three elected officers of the company were company commander Captain William Inness, First Lieutenant B. Frank Rogers, both of whom had toured in Ellsworth's United States Zouave Cadets, and Second Lieutenant Eugene Beauharnais Payne. It was possible that the men of Waukegan were not only inspired by the Zouave tour but also Ellsworth himself had drilled nearby Lake Forest Academy students in Zouave tactics.

Eager to serve their nation by putting down the Secessionists, the Waukegan Zouaves moved to Chicago, where they joined twelve other Chicago companies. The Chicago companies than entrained to an area on the western outskirts of state capitol of Springfield. Formerly the Sangamon County Fairgrounds, it soon became the hastily built military reservation named Camp Yates, modestly named after Illinois’ then governor Richard Yates. Camp Yates’ days as a military facility were short.

The Waukegan Zouaves and most of the other volunteer companies enlisted for 90 days were disbanded after one month of camp life. The act of the Legislature of the State of Illinois, passed on May 2, 1861, authorised the acceptance for state service of ten regiments of infantry, one regiment of cavalry and one battalion of light artillery, and provided that one of such infantry regiments might be raised from the volunteer companies then at Camp Yates, and one regiment from each of the nine congressional districts, with the cavalry and artillery recruited from across the state. The new regiments were mustered into federal service for three years on June 17, 1861.

Most of the Waukegan Zouaves reenlisted at the next call for three year volunteers, forming Company C (The Lake County Rifles) of the 37th Illinois Volunteer Infantry electing Eugene Payne as their Captain. He fought in the battles of Pea Ridge where he was wounded, with his younger brother Corporal Frederick Payne being killed and scalped by the Confederate Cherokees.

Promoted to major, Eugene Payne fought at the Battle of Prairie Grove and the Siege of Vicksburg where at times he commanded his regiment. After the battle he contracted malaria but later returned to duty and was promoted to the rank of lieutenant colonel.

For his bravery he was brevetted colonel and later brigadier general, becoming the first soldier of Lake County to become a brigadier general, on March 12, 1865.

Payne was an Original Companion of the Military Order of the Loyal Legion of the United States.

== Post Civil War service ==
From 1866 to 1870 Payne represented Lake County in the Illinois House of Representatives. During his second term he served as chairman of the Finance Committee of his Chamber. For several years he resided at Waukegan, and later at Evanston where he engaged in the practice of law in Chicago until 1887, when ill health ended his career.

In 1905 he authored Digest of Decisions of the Department of the Interior.

He and his family moved to Cleveland, Ohio. The last years of his life were spent in Washington, D.C., where he died in 1910.

He is interred at Arlington National Cemetery.

== Personal life ==
He married Adelia Theressa Wright in 1862 and had three children, Mary, Daniel and Charles.

He authored The 37th Illinois Veteran Volunteer Infantry and the battle of Pea Ridge, Arkansas Washington, 1903.
