= 16th Illinois Cavalry Regiment =

16th Regiment Illinois Volunteer Cavalry
- Illinois flag
- Active: December 25, 1862, to August 31, 1865
- Country: United States
- Allegiance: Union
- Branch: Cavalry
- Engagements: Battle of Resaca; Siege of Atlanta; Battle of Franklin; Battle of Nashville

The 16th Regiment Illinois Volunteer Cavalry was a cavalry regiment that served in the Union Army during the American Civil War.

== Service ==
The 16th Illinois Cavalry was organized at Camp Butler, Illinois, between January and May 1863, from numerous independent companies of Illinois cavalry.

The regiment mustered out on August 19, 1865.

== Total strength and casualties ==
The regiment suffered 3 officers and 30 enlisted men who were killed in action or who died of their wounds and 1 officer and 228 enlisted men who died of disease, for a total of 262 fatalities.

== Commanders ==
- Colonel Christian Thielemann - discharged August 9, 1864.
- Colonel Robert Wilson Smith

== Notable members ==
- George P. McLain (1847–1930), Los Angeles, California, City Council member at the turn of the 19th-20th centuries
- Sgt Paul Vandervoort, Company M - 11th Commander-in-Chief of the Grand Army of the Republic, 1882–1883

== See also ==
- List of Illinois Civil War Units
- Illinois in the American Civil War
