= Elias Riggs Monfort =

American Union Army officer and attorney

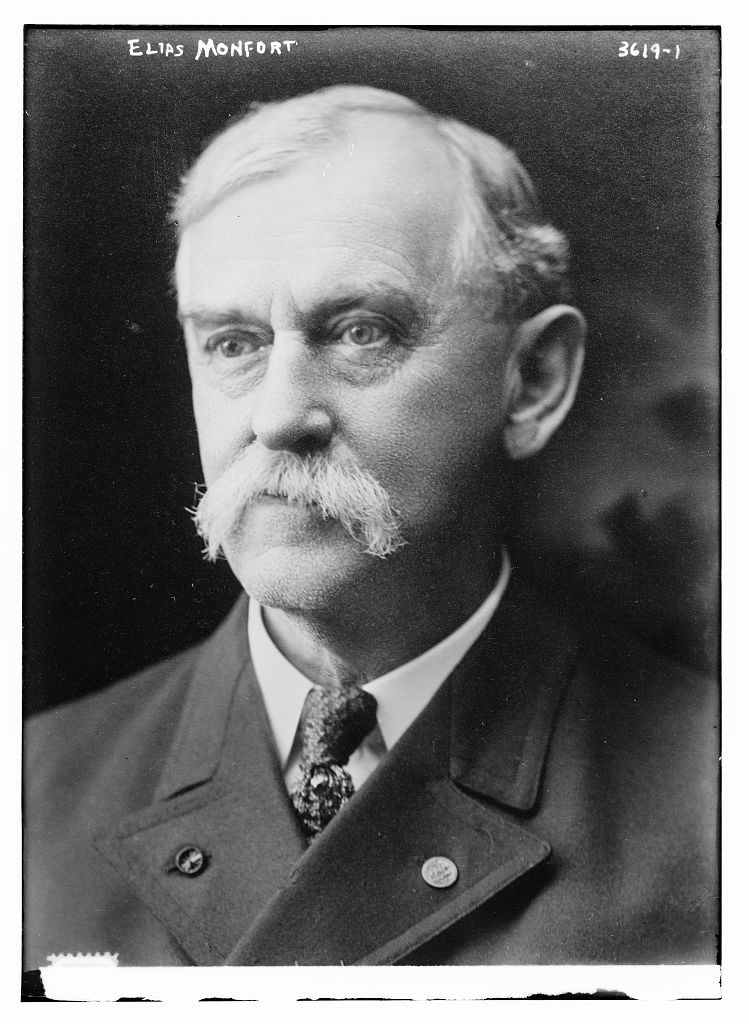
- Monfort circa 1915

Commander-in-Chief of the Grand Army of the Republic
- In office 1915–1916
- Preceded by: David James Palmer
- Succeeded by: William James Patterson

Personal details
- Born: March 2, 1842 Greensburg, Indiana
- Died: July 29, 1920 (aged 78) Oaks Corners, New York
- Parent(s): Joseph Glass Monfort; Hannah Conger Riggs

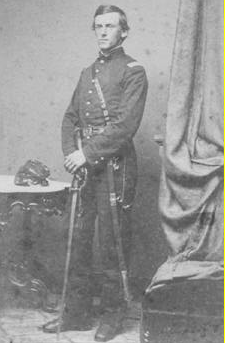
Elias Riggs Monfort 75th OVI

Elias Riggs Monfort ca 1870s

Elias Riggs Monfort (March 2, 1842 – July 29, 1920) was a Union Civil War officer, attorney, the postmaster for Cincinnati, Ohio, and Commander-in-Chief of the Grand Army of the Republic from 1915 to 1916.

== Biography ==
He was born on March 2, 1842, at Greensburg, Indiana, to Joseph Glass Monfort, D.D., LL.D. and Hannah Conger Riggs. Hannah was the sister of Elias Riggs. When he was 13 years old, in 1855, the family moved to Cincinnati, Ohio.

=== Civil War ===
Elias enlisted June 18, 1861, as a private in Company A, 6th Ohio Infantry. On October 5, 1861, he was promoted to second lieutenant and transferred to Company F, 75th Ohio Infantry. He was then commissioned first lieutenant of this company on May 15, 1862, and captain of the same on January 12, 1863. He participated in 20 engagements, among which were the following: Phillipi, Laurel Hill, Carrick's Ford, Monterey, Shaw's Ridge, McDowell, Franklin, Strausburg, Cross Keys, Cedar Mountain, Freeman's Ford, Waterloo Bridge, Sulfur Springs, Second Bull Run, Chantilly, Chancellorsville, Fredericksburg, and Gettysburg. In the last battle, he was dangerously wounded, July 2, 1863, which made it necessary for him to submit to repeated surgical operations, the last occurring in June 1911.

In 1864, Monfort was discharged with the rank of captain. Monfort saved letters written to him in the field of battle. His family saved his letters as well. In 2013 the Monfort Family transferred these letters to Hanover College for the purpose of study and preservation. Digitized originals and transcriptions of these letters can be seen at Hanover's website.

=== Discharge ===
On December 24, 1863, discharge papers recounted the wound received at Gettysburg on July 2, 1863. The last piece of metal was removed from Mr Monfort's thigh on June 12, 1912—some 49 years later.

Cincinnati Ohio
December 24th 1863

The Board examined E R Monfort Capt of "F" company 75th O.V.I. Enlisted June 21st and commissioned Oct 8th 1861. Age 21 years. Has served in Western Virginia Mountain Dept and armies of Virginia and the Potomac. Was at Battles of Carricks Ford, McDowell, Cross Keys, Cedar Mountain, 2nd Bull Run, Chancellorsville, Fredericksburg, and Gettysburg. At the latter, enfield bullet entered outer face of left thigh about 2 inches below trochanter major passed downward and forward in front of bone, which is probably grazed and was excised in several fragments from inner face from two to four inches below groin. Says that hemorrhage followed, wound was nearly fatal. A Piece of saber about three inches long was excised 17 weeks after receiving wound; from about middle of thigh, and several smaller pieces of steel a few days later. A number of splinters of wood and pieces of clothing and paper have been discharged or extracted. Has leave of absence of 20 days from August 30th 1863. States that Surgeons certificates have been forwarded as required. Now. Wound of entrance still open with moderate discharge and scars of numerous incisions on face of inner thigh. Uses crutch, but can walk a little without it, Since extraction of long piece of sabre on Oct 31st 1863. has been constantly improving. Within a few days has ridden on horse-back without inconvenience. No pain for last four weeks. General health good, Looks thin but healthy. The Board respectfully recommends that this officer be honorably discharged.

J. F. Head, Surgeon US Army
R Jones, Major and Asst Inspr Genl USA
A J Slemmer, Brig Genl US Vols

On July 5, 1863, Issac Watts Monfort, acting as Military Agent of the State of Indiana found his nephew Elias Riggs Monfort at the Lightner Farmhouse. His recollection from July 24, 1884, was additional evidence as part of a Pension Case:

...on or about the 5th of July 1863, I found said E R Monfort at a temporary hospital about six miles from Gettysburg on the Baltimore Turnpike and that he was suffering from a gunshot wound in the left thigh. He was in an insensible condition. Attention was called to his case by myself and at my request several consultations were held by the surgeon in all instance upon the wounded there as to the prospects of recovery. The wound was believed to be a fatal one with a bare possibility that with the best skill and nursing the limb might be saved and that there was also but a bare possibility of recovery if the limb was amputated at or so near the thigh joint. At my earnest solicitation it was concluded to accept the equal chance for recovery and not amputate...

By July 9, Issac felt comfortable enough to send a telegram to his brother Joseph Glass Monfort to come to Gettysburg to see his wounded son.

=== Post Civil War ===
After the war, he continued his studies at Hanover College, going about on crutches, and graduated in 1865. Having decided upon a legal career, he then entered the Cincinnati Law School, from which he graduated in 1867 and was admitted to the bar.

Monfort was married September 6, 1867, to Emma A. Taylor, who died October 24, 1914. They had three children, Joseph Taylor Monfort, Hannah Louise Monfort Burtis, and Marguerite Moorhead Monfort Simrall.

He began practice at Greensburg, Indiana and Cincinnati Ohio. He continued for eight years until failing health forced him to retire from the legal profession. He became prosecuting attorney of the Fourth Judicial Circuit District of Indiana (two years) later, a district attorney of the Twenty-Second District of Indiana (two years). Returning to Cincinnati to make his home, he later entered the service of The Herald and Presbyter, of which he rose to the position of editor in 1875 and continued as such for 20 years.

In 1896, Monfort was elected clerk of the Court of Common Pleas of Hamilton County, Ohio and served one term. He was selected in 1899 by President McKinley to fill the responsible position of postmaster of the city of Cincinnati. One of the post offices under his administration was named after him. He held this position for 16 years, resigning January 1, 1915. He was a life member of the National Association of the Postmasters of the First Class and of the Ohio State Historical Society.

Monfort became part owner of The Herald and Presbyter and served as president of the Mamolyth Paint Company until 1914. He also served as a director and trustee of 14 organizations. He supported the Republican Party and was a thirty-second degree Mason and a Knight Templar.

=== Grand Army of the Republic ===
Monfort was Commander of the Grand Army of the Republic Jones Post #401 in 1890, Commander of the GAR Department of Ohio in 1900, Commander of the Ohio Commandery of the Military Order of the Loyal Legion of the United States in 1906. In 1915, he was elected Commander-in-Chief of the GAR at the National Encampment at Washington, D.C. He had refused the position three times on account of obligation to public service. Monfort attended nearly all of the Ohio State encampments and was 28 times a representative at the National Encampment.

== Death ==
He died on July 29, 1920, at Oaks Corners, New York. He was buried in Spring Grove Cemetery in Cincinnati, Ohio.

== Legacy ==
In the 1920s a newly consolidated local school district took its name from the Monfort post office and added “Heights” because of its altitude to create the Monfort Heights school district. The name "Monfort Heights" remains in use for the local community.
