= Sampson Harris =

Sampson Harris may refer to:

- Sampson Willis Harris (1809–1857), American politician and lawyer in the states of Georgia and Alabama
- Sampson Harris (Medal of Honor) (1841–1905), Union Army soldier and Medal of Honor recipient
