= William Schmidt (Medal of Honor) =

American civil war soldier (1845–1905)

Private William Schmidt
- Born: July 10, 1845; Tiffin, Ohio, U.S.
- Died: June 3, 1905 (aged 59); Minneapolis, Minnesota, U.S.
- Burial place: Lakewood Cemetery; Minneapolis, Minnesota, U.S.
- Military career
- Allegiance: United States
- Branch: Army
- Service years: 1861-1865
- Rank: Private
- Units: Company G, 37th Ohio Infantry
- Conflicts: Missionary Ridge, Tennessee

William Schmidt (10 July 1845 - 3 June 1905) was a private in the United States Army who was awarded the Presidential Medal of Honor for gallantry during the American Civil War. He was awarded the medal on 9 November 1895 for actions performed on 25 November 1863 at the Battle of Missionary Ridge in Tennessee.

== Personal life ==
Schmidt was born on 10 July 1845 in Tiffin, Seneca County, Ohio. His home of record was Maumee, Ohio. He died on 3 June 1905 and was buried in Lakewood Cemetery (Section 8, Tier E, Grave 74) in Minneapolis, Minnesota.

== Military service ==
Schmidt enlisted in the Army as a private on 12 September 1861 in Maumee and was mustered into Company G, 37th Ohio Infantry on the same day. The company mustered into service on 2 October 1861 at Camp Dennison near Cincinnati, Ohio.

During his unit's attack on Confederate positions at Missionary Ridge and while under heavy fire, Schmidt volunteered to rescue drummer John S. Kountz, who later also won a Medal of Honor. Kountz had been shot in the left leg and was lying in the line of fire. Despite Kountz saying "Save yourself. I am a goner anyhow", Schmidt picked him up and carried him to safety. This was the first instance of a Medal of Honor recipient saving another recipient.

Schmidt's Medal of Honor citation reads:

The President of the United States of America, in the name of Congress, takes pleasure in presenting the Medal of Honor to Private William Schmidt, United States Army, for extraordinary heroism on 25 November 1863, while serving with Company G, 37th Ohio Infantry, in action at Missionary Ridge, Tennessee. Private Schmidt rescued a wounded comrade under terrific fire.

— D. S. Lamont, Secretary of War
