= William James Patterson =

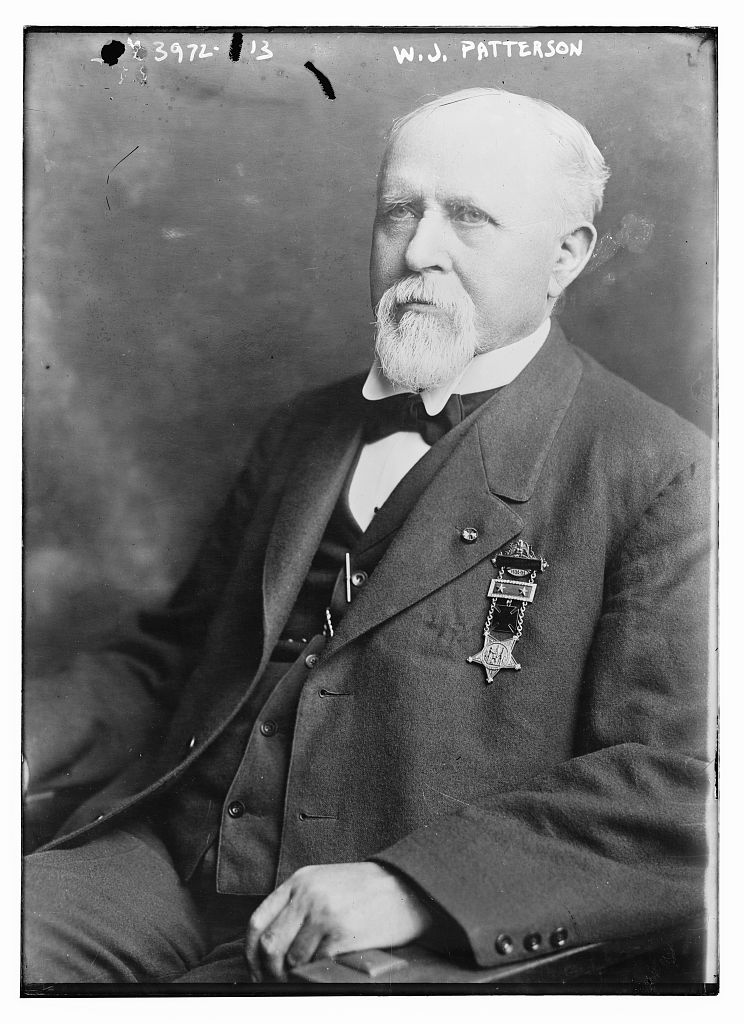
- Patterson circa 1916

Commander-in-Chief of the Grand Army of the Republic
- In office 1916–1917
- Preceded by: Elias Riggs Monfort
- Succeeded by: Orlando Allen Somers

Personal details
- Born: February 7, 1838 Ireland
- Died: November 6, 1926 (aged 88) Pittsburgh, Pennsylvania

William James Patterson (February 7, 1838 – November 6, 1926) was the Commander-in-Chief of the Grand Army of the Republic from 1916 to 1917.

== Biography ==
He was born in Ireland on February 7, 1838. By 1860 he had migrated to the United States. He served in the American Civil War and was wounded and captured at the Battle of Gaines' Mill. He served as the Pennsylvania's Department Commander of the Grand Army of the Republic from 1898 to 1899. In May 1913 he was named to an eight-member commission to plan the 50th anniversary commemoration of the Battle of Gettysburg. He was the Commander-in-Chief of the Grand Army of the Republic from 1916 to 1917. He died on November 6, 1926.
