= William P. Wright =

American Civil War officer (1846–1933)

Captain William Parkinson Wright (March 29, 1846 – June 15, 1933) was a veteran of the American Civil War. He was an officer in the 156th Illinois Volunteer Infantry during the war.

Write was born on March 29, 1846, in Naperville, DuPage County, Illinois.
