= Ivan N. Walker =

American soldier (1839–1905)

- Born: February 3, 1839; Arlington, Indiana
- Died: November 25, 1905 (aged 66); Crown Hill Cemetery and Arborteum Sec 13, Lot 31
- Burial place: Crown Hill Cemetery and Arborteum
- Military career
- Allegiance: United States of America; Union
- Branch: United States Army; Union Army
- Service years: 1862–1864
- Rank: Lieutenant Colonel
- Unit: 73rd Indiana Volunteer Infantry
- Conflicts: American Civil War: Battle of Perryville; Battle of Stones River; Streight's Raid
- Other work: 24th Commander-in-Chief of the Grand Army of the Republic (G.A.R.), state civil service

Ivan N. Walker (February 3, 1839 – November 25, 1905) was an American soldier who served in the Union Army during the American Civil War and as the 24th Commander-in-Chief of the Grand Army of the Republic, 1895–1896.

== Early life and military career ==
Walker was born February 3, 1839, in Arlington, Indiana, to James and Jane (McBride) Walker. He moved to the Fort Wayne area with his family when he was a young boy, where he attended the local schools.

Walker was working as deputy warden at the Indiana State Prison in Michigan City when the Civil War began. He enlisted at age 23 on August 5, 1862, in Company K, 73rd Indiana Volunteer Infantry, and was commissioned captain.

Following the Battle of Stones River, Walker was promoted to major for his gallant service. In March 1863, he was promoted to lieutenant colonel. Following the death of the regiment's colonel in May 1863, Walker was given command of the regiment without further promotion.

During Streight's Raid, the 73rd Indiana Infantry was captured. Walker was sent to Libby Prison in Richmond, Virginia. He and other officers began working on a tunnel out of the prison on February 9, 1864. Walker succeeded in escaping the prison, but was recaptured by Confederates near Union lines. He was returned to prison and eventually exchanged in May 1864.

After his exchange, Walker returned to the 73rd Indiana Infantry, which was then guarding the supply lines along the Tennessee River between Decatur and Stevenson, Alabama, in support of Maj. Gen. William T. Sherman's Atlanta campaign. Walker's long imprisonment in harsh conditions weakened his health, and he resigned his commission on July 4, 1864. He returned to Michigan City where he married Anna Layton on October 27, 1864. Still wishing to serve, Walker relocated to Nashville, Tennessee, where he served as a volunteer aide on the staff of Maj. Gen. George H. Thomas and performed valuable service during the siege and Battle of Nashville.

== Post-war service ==
Walker and his wife remained in Nashville until 1870, when they moved to Indianapolis, Indiana. He served as a Marion County deputy county auditor and state tax commissioner for several years.

He was an active member of the G.A.R. from its inception and served in every office from Post Commander up to Commander-in-Chief. Walker was serving as Post Commander of George H. Thomas Post No. 17 (Indianapolis) when he was appointed Assistant Adjutant General of the department in 1887. In 1891 Walker was elected Department Commander and in 1893 he was elected Senior Vice-Commander-in-Chief.

Walker was unanimously elected 24th Commander-in-Chief of the Grand Army of the Republic and served 1895–1896. While attending the 1905 national convention in Denver, Colorado, he became seriously ill. Walker died on November 25, 1905, and is buried at Crown Hill Cemetery in Indianapolis.

== See also ==
- List of Grand Army of the Republic commanders-in-chief

Political offices
Preceded by Thomas G. Lawler	Commander-in-Chief of the Grand Army of the Republic; 1895 – 1896	Succeeded by Thaddeus Stevens Clarkson
