= Frederick Rock =

U.S. Army private who was awarded the Presidential Medal of Honor

Private Frederick Rock
- Born: 15 February 1840; Darmstadt, Electorate of Hesse (modern day Hesse, Germany)
- Died: 7 November 1924 (aged 84); Tampa, Florida
- Burial place: Woodlawn Cemetery, Tampa, Florida
- Military career
- Allegiance: United States (Union)
- Branch: Army
- Service years: 1861-1865
- Rank: Private
- Units: Company A, 37th Ohio Infantry
- Conflicts: Siege of Vicksburg
- Awards: Medal of Honor

Frederick Rock (15 February 1840 - 7 November 1924) was a private in the United States Army who was awarded the Presidential Medal of Honor for gallantry during the American Civil War. He was awarded the medal on 10 August 1894 for actions performed at the Siege of Vicksburg on 22 May 1863.

== Personal life ==
Rock was born in Darmstadt in the Electorate of Hesse (modern day Hesse, Germany) on 15 February 1840. He emigrated to the United States in 1846, settling in Cleveland, Ohio. Before joining the Army in 1861, he had moved to Canada to farm. He married Mary A. Rock. After leaving the Army he worked in Cleveland as a laborer and watchman until 1875. He died in Tampa, Florida on 7 November 1924 and was buried in Woodlawn Cemetery in Tampa.

== Military service ==
Rock enlisted in the Army as a private on 15 August 1861 at Cleveland. He was assigned to Company A of the 37th Ohio Infantry. On 22 May 1863, during the Siege of Vicksburg by Union troops, Rock volunteered, along with 149 other men, to be a part of an extremely dangerous storming mission to build a bridge over a Confederate defensive moat east of Vicksburg. During the course of the assault, nearly 85 percent of the men were wounded or killed. For this action, Rock was awarded the Medal of Honor.

Rock's Medal of Honor citation reads:

The President of the United States of America, in the name of Congress, takes pleasure in presenting the Medal of Honor to Private Frederick Rock, United States Army, for gallantry in the charge of the volunteer storming party on 22 May 1863, while serving with Company A, 37th Ohio Infantry, in action at Vicksburg, Mississippi.

— D. S. Lamont, Secretary of War

After the attack, Rock left his regiment as a deserter and was carried by the Army from 28 April 1864 until his discharge at Camp Cleveland on 7 August 1865.
