= Robert Burns Beath =

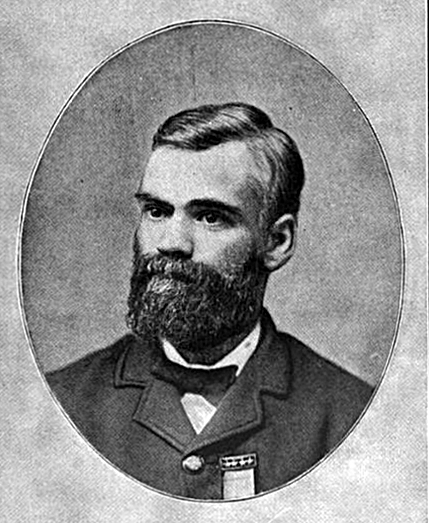
- Born: January 25, 1839; Philadelphia, Pennsylvania
- Died: November 25, 1914 (aged 75); Philadelphia, Pennsylvania
- Burial place: Woodlands Cemetery, Philadelphia, Pennsylvania
- Military career
- Allegiance: United States of America; Union
- Branch: United States Army; Union Army
- Service years: 1861–1865
- Rank: Lieutenant Colonel
- Units: Company G, 23rd Pennsylvania Infantry (3-month regiment); Company D, 88th Pennsylvania Infantry; Company A, 8th United States Colored Infantry; F&S, 8th United States Colored Infantry
- Conflicts: American Civil War: Second Battle of Bull Run; Battle of Chaffin's Farm
- Other work: 12th Commander-in-Chief of the Grand Army of the Republic

Robert Burns Beath (January 25, 1839 – November 25, 1914) was an American soldier who served in the Union Army during the American Civil War and as the 12th Commander-in-Chief of the Grand Army of the Republic, 1883–1884.

== Early life and military career ==
Beath was born January 25, 1839, in Philadelphia, Pennsylvania, to David and Rabena (Wilson) Beath.

He first enlisted April 21, 1861, as a corporal in Company G, 23rd Pennsylvania Infantry (a 3-month regiment) and mustered out July 31, 1861, at Philadelphia. He reenlisted September 5, 1861, as a sergeant in Company D, 88th Pennsylvania Infantry and was promoted June 1, 1862, to 1st sergeant and promoted December 1, 1862, to 2nd lieutenant. Beath was wounded at the Second Battle of Bull Run. He was subsequently promoted to captain on August 29, 1863, and mustered out on the same day to accept a transfer to command Company A, 8th United States Colored Infantry. He was seriously wounded in action at the Battle of Chaffin's Farm, resulting in the amputation of his right leg. On June 1, 1865, Beath was promoted to lieutenant colonel and mustered out of the service on September 20, 1865.

== Post-war service ==
Almost immediately after the Civil War, Beath became active in establishing a veterans' organization. He was a charter member and first commander of the first G.A.R. post established in Pennsylvania (October 1866). The following year, Beath became Junior Vice-Commander, Department of Pennsylvania, was assistant adjutant general (1867-1869), and served as Commander of the Department of Pennsylvania in 1873.

He was elected 12th Commander-in-Chief of the G.A.R. and remained very active with the organization until his death. Beath is credited with writing the first history of the organization (1888), establishing its rules and regulations, and was a member of the board of trustees for the permanent fund.

He was also a veteran companion of the Pennsylvania Commandery of the Military Order of the Loyal Legion of the United States.

Beath died November 25, 1914, at his home in Philadelphia and is buried in Woodlands Cemetery.

== See also ==
- List of Grand Army of the Republic commanders-in-chief

Political offices
Preceded by Paul Vandervoort	Commander-in-Chief of the Grand Army of the Republic; 1883 – 1884	Succeeded by John S. Kountz
