= Samuel Swinfin Burdett =

United States politician

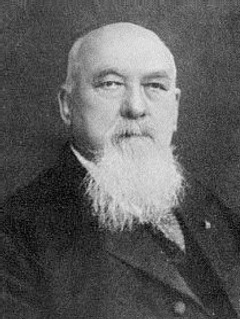

Member of the U.S. House of Representatives from Missouri's 5th district
- In office March 4, 1869 – March 3, 1873
- Preceded by: John H. Stover
- Succeeded by: Richard P. Bland

12th Commander in Chief of the Grand Army of the Republic
- In office 1885–1886
- Preceded by: John S. Kountz
- Succeeded by: Lucius Fairchild

Personal details
- Born: February 21, 1836 Broughton Astley, Leicestershire, England
- Died: September 24, 1914 (aged 78) Broughton Astley, Leicestershire, England
- Resting place: Arlington National Cemetery
- Education: Oberlin College

Samuel Swinfin Burdett (February 21, 1836 – September 24, 1914) was a U.S. representative from Missouri.

== Biography ==
He was born on February 21, 1836, in The Old Manse, Broughton Astley, bordering Sutton-in-the-Elms in Leicestershire, England. His father was minister at Sutton-in-the-Elms Baptist Chapel.

When twelve years of age he emigrated to the United States. He worked on a farm in Lorain County, Ohio, and attended the common schools. He studied law at Oberlin College, Ohio, was admitted to the bar in 1858 and commenced practice in DeWitt, Iowa. Burdett was an abolitionist and joined John Brown during the Bleeding Kansas conflict in May 1856. He entered the Union Army as a private in the First Regiment, Iowa Volunteer Cavalry, in May 1861. He was promoted to the rank of lieutenant, later becoming captain, and served until August 1864. He served as assistant provost marshal general from March 1, 1864 – August 1, 1864. He moved to Osceola, St. Clair County, Missouri, in December 1865. Attorney for the seventh circuit in 1868 and 1869. He served as delegate to the Republican National Convention in 1868.

Burdett was elected as a Republican to the Forty-first and Forty-second Congresses (March 4, 1869 – March 3, 1873). He served as chairman of the Committee on Manufactures (Forty-second Congress). He was an unsuccessful candidate in 1872 for reelection to the Forty-third Congress. He resumed the practice of law in Osceola, Missouri. He was appointed Commissioner of the General Land Office in 1874. He engaged in the practice of law in Washington, D.C., residing at Glencarlyn, Virginia, during his last years. Commander in chief of the Grand Army of the Republic from 1885 to 1886. He founded the Arlington, Virginia neighborhood of Glencarlyn with his partner George W. Curtis in 1888.

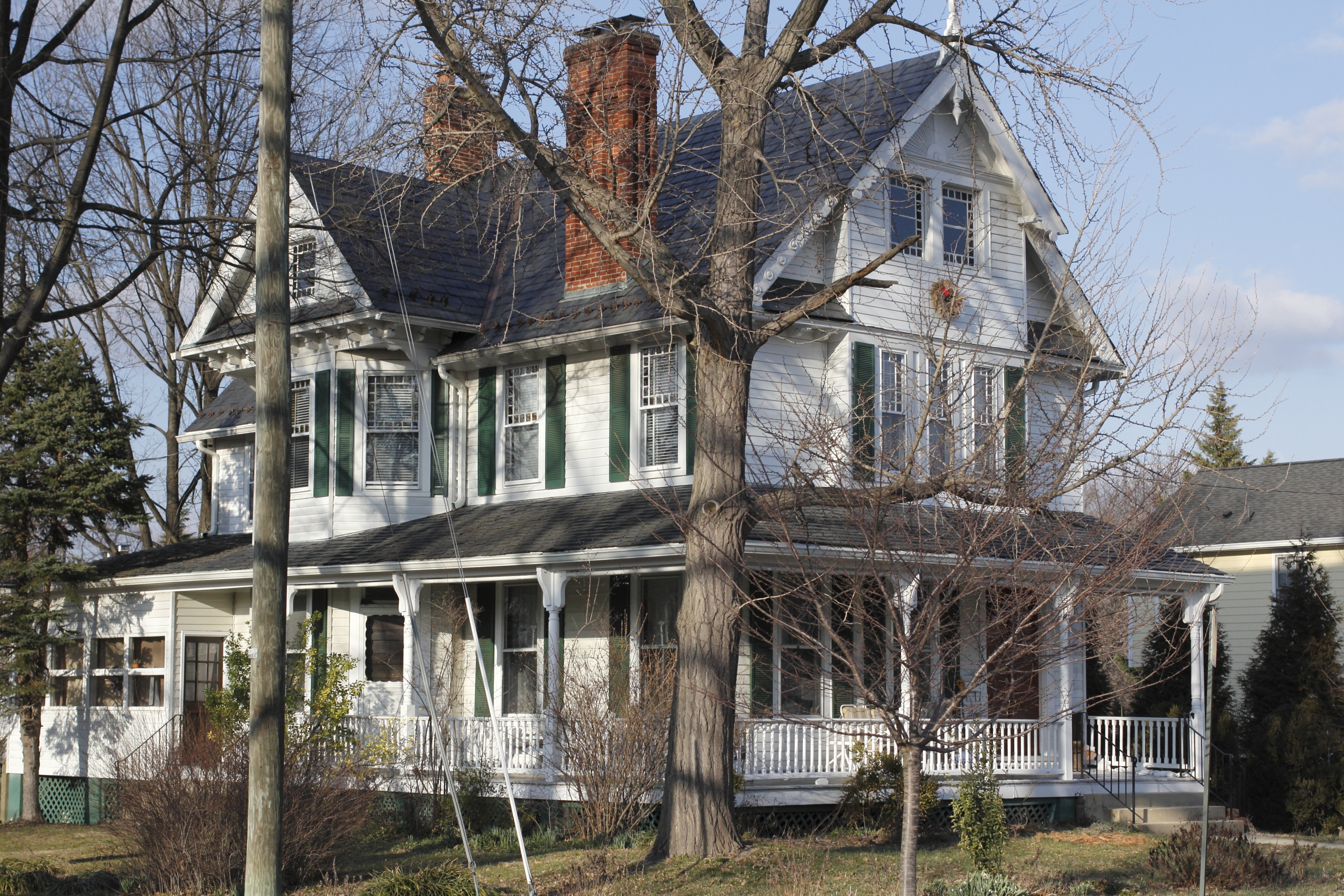
The Samuel S. Burdett house in Glencarlyn, Arlington, Virginia.

When he was old he decided that he would like to visit the place where he was born. He travelled to England and stayed at the Old Manse (now 12, Green Rd) Broughton Astley, Leicestershire. He suddenly became ill, and some days later he died, on September 24, 1914, in the very room in which he had been born. He was buried with his wife, Nancy (1826–1906) in Arlington National Cemetery.

== Legacy ==
He is the namesake of the community of Burdett, Missouri.

U.S. House of Representatives
Preceded by John H. Stover	Member of the U.S. House of Representatives from Missouri's 5th congressional district 1869–1873	Succeeded by Richard P. Bland
Political offices
Preceded by Willis Drummond	Commissioner of the General Land Office; 1874–1876	Succeeded by James A. Williamson
Preceded by John S. Kountz	Commander-in-Chief of the Grand Army of the Republic; 1885–1886	Succeeded by Lucius Fairchild
