= Louis Wagner (American general) =

Commander-in-Chief of the Grand Army of the Republic

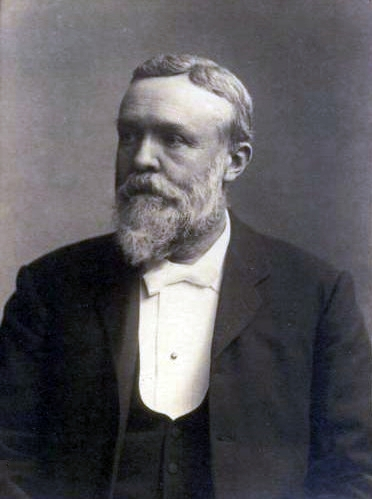
- Born: August 4, 1838; Giessen, Grand Duchy of Hesse
- Died: January 15, 1914 (aged 75); Germantown, Pennsylvania
- Burial place: Ivy Hill Cemetery; Philadelphia, Pennsylvania
- Military career
- Allegiance: United States of America; Union
- Branch: United States Army; Union Army
- Service years: 1861–1865
- Rank: Colonel; Brevet Brigadier General
- Unit: 88th Pennsylvania Infantry
- Commands: 5th Brigade, Pennsylvania National Guard
- Conflicts: American Civil War: Battle of Cedar Mountain; First Battle of Rappahannock Station; Battle of Thoroughfare Gap; Battle of Groveton; Second Battle of Bull Run; Battle of Chancellorsville
- Other work: 9th Commander-in-Chief, Grand Army of the Republic

Louis Wagner (August 4, 1838 – January 15, 1914) was a German-born American military infantry officer who served in the Union Army and as the 9th Commander-in-Chief of the Grand Army of the Republic, 1880-1881.

== Early life and military career ==
Wagner was born August 4, 1838, in Giessen, Germany. He moved with his parents to the United States at age 11 and eventually learned the trade of a lithograph printer.

Wagner enlisted in August 1861 with the 88th Pennsylvania Volunteer Infantry during the Civil War and was mustered in September 13, 1861, and commissioned 1st lieutenant of Company D. He rose to the rank of captain of Company D and was wounded in action at the Second Battle of Bull Run and captured, but paroled and recovered in hospital at Alexandria, Virginia; for his distinguished service during the battle, he was promoted to major of the regiment.

Wagner was wounded in action again at the Battle of Chancellorsville and returned to Philadelphia where he was recovering but deemed unfit for service in the field. During his recovery, Wagner was promoted to lieutenant colonel, and he volunteered for the command of Camp William Penn, the first United States Army training camp for African American soldiers. Upon a surgeon's recommendation, Wagner received the command and was detached from his regiment during the entire time that the camp was in operation.

Wagner was eventually promoted colonel and served as commander of the 5th Brigade, Pennsylvania National Guard until the war's end.

For meritorious service during the war, Wagner received a promotion to brevet brigadier general of U.S. Volunteers, March 13, 1865.

== Post-war service ==
After the war, Wagner served as commissioner of public works for Philadelphia and was very active in the Grand Army of the Republic, both at the local, state, and national levels.

Wagner was a charter member and first commander of G.A.R. Post #6 in Germantown, November 13, 1866. The following year he was elected commander of the Pennsylvania Department and both junior vice-commander and commander-in-chief in 1870. He served as senior vice-commander-in-chief, 1871–1872. Wagner was elected 9th commander-in-chief of the G.A.R. in 1880 at the national encampment in Dayton, Ohio.

During his membership with the G.A.R., from 1868 to 1913, he only missed two national encampments.

Wagner died January 15, 1914, at his home in Germantown and is buried in Ivy Hill Cemetery, Philadelphia.

== See also ==
- List of Grand Army of the Republic commanders-in-chief

Political offices
| Preceded by William Earnshaw | Commander-in-Chief of the Grand Army of the Republic; 1880 – 1881 | Succeeded by George Sargent Merrill |
