= Christian Schnell =

American Union Army soldier

- Born: February 19, 1838; Virginia
- Died: December 14, 1908 (aged 70)
- Burial place: Greelawn Cemetery, Wapakoneta, Ohio
- Military career
- Allegiance: United States of America
- Branch: United States Army; Union Army
- Rank: Corporal
- Unit: 37th Ohio Infantry
- Conflicts: Siege of Vicksburg
- Awards: Medal of Honor

Christian Schnell (February 19, 1838 – December 14, 1908) was an American soldier who fought for the Union Army during the American Civil War. He received the Medal of Honor for valor.

== Biography ==
Schnell served in the 37th Ohio Infantry. He received the Medal of Honor on July 10, 1894, for his actions at the Siege of Vicksburg on May 22, 1863.

== Medal of Honor citation ==
Citation:

Gallantry in the charge of the "volunteer storming party."

== See also ==
- List of American Civil War Medal of Honor recipients: Q-S
