= George Sargent Merrill =

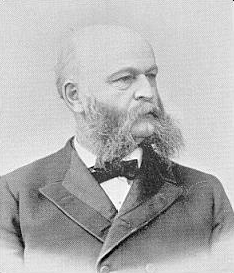
- Born: March 10, 1837; Methuen, Massachusetts
- Died: February 17, 1900 (aged 62); Lawrence, Massachusetts
- Military career
- Allegiance: United States of America; Union
- Branch: United States Army; Union Army
- Service years: 1862–1863
- Rank: captain
- Units: Company B, 4th Regiment Massachusetts Infantry (nine-month militia)
- Conflicts: American Civil War: Skirmish at Port Barre, Louisiana; Siege of Port Hudson
- Other work: newspaper editor, 10th Commander-in-Chief, Grand Army of the Republic

George Sargent Merrill (March 10, 1837 – February 17, 1900) was an American soldier who served in the Union Army and as the 10th Commander-in-Chief of the Grand Army of the Republic, 1881-1882.

== Early life and military career ==
Merrill was born March 10, 1837, in Methuen, Massachusetts, to Johnathan and Margaret (Clark) Merrill.

On August 28, 1862, Merrill enlisted in Company B, 4th Regiment Massachusetts Infantry (nine-month militia) and commissioned 1st lieutenant, September 1, 1862. He was promoted to captain on December 8, 1862. He mustered out of the service with the regiment August 28, 1863, at Camp Hooker in Lakeville, Massachusetts.

== Post-war service ==
In 1875, Merrill was elected Commander of the Massachusetts Department, Grand Army of the Republic. He was elected the 10th Commander-in-Chief of the G.A.R. in 1881 at the national encampment in Indianapolis, Indiana. Following his service as Commander-in-Chief, Merrill continued to serve the organization as chairman of the pensions committee and was very active as an advocate for Civil War veterans' pensions as a lobbyist to the United States Congress.

He was also a veteran companion of the Massachusetts Commandery of the Military Order of the Loyal Legion of the United States.

Merrill died February 17, 1900, in Lawrence, Massachusetts, and is buried there in Bellevue Cemetery.

== See also ==
- List of Grand Army of the Republic commanders-in-chief

Political offices
Preceded by Louis Wagner	Commander-in-Chief of the Grand Army of the Republic; 1881 – 1882	Succeeded by Paul Vandervoort
