= 37th Ohio Infantry Regiment =

- Active: October 2, 1861, to August 7, 1865
- Country: United States
- Allegiance: Union
- Branch: Union Army
- Type: Infantry
- Engagements: Battle of Princeton Court House; Vicksburg Campaign; Siege of Vicksburg; Siege of Jackson; Chattanooga campaign; Memphis & Charleston Railroad; Battle of Missionary Ridge; Atlanta campaign; Battle of Resaca; Battle of New Hope Church; Battle of Dallas; Battle of Marietta; Battle of Kennesaw Mountain; Battle of Atlanta; Battle of Ezra Church; Battle of Jonesborough; Sherman's March to the Sea; Siege of Savannah; Second Battle of Fort McAllister; Campaign of the Carolinas; Battle of Bentonville

Commanders
- Colonel: Edward Siber
- Lt. Col.: Louis VonBlessingh
- Major: Charles Hipp

The 37th Ohio Infantry Regiment was a Union Army regiment, composed of German-Americans, in the American Civil War. It was organized in the fall of 1861, under Colonel Edward Siber, and served in the Kanawha Valley until December 1862. It joined the Union army operating against Vicksburg, Mississippi, in January 1863, and participated in the various engagements of the siege. After the fall of that stronghold it was moved across Tennessee from Memphis to Chattanooga, and took part in operations of the 15th Corps, subsequent to, and at the taking of Atlanta, Georgia. It then followed the fortunes of that well-known corps until the reaching of Washington, D.C. From Louisville, Kentucky, it went with the 2nd Division of the Corps to Little Rock, Arkansas, and was there mustered out in August 1865.

== Service ==
The 37th Ohio Infantry Regiment was organized was organized at Cleveland, recruited among the Germans of Cleveland, Toledo, St. Marys, Youngstown, Columbus, and Chillicothe. It trained at Camp Dennison, Ohio, and mustered on October 2, 1861, to serve three years.

The regiment was ordered to the Kanawha Valley, West Virginia and attached to Benham's Brigade, District of the Kanawha, West Virginia, to October, 1861. District of the Kanawha, West Virginia, to March, 1862. 2nd Brigade, Kanawha Division, Department of the Mountains, to May, 1862. 2nd Brigade, Kanawha Division, West Virginia, to August, 1862. District of the Kanawha, West Virginia, Department of the Ohio, to December, 1862. Ewing's Brigade, Kanawha Division, West Virginia, to January, 1863. 3rd Brigade, 2nd Division, 15th Army Corps, Army of the Tennessee, to October, 1863. 2nd Brigade, 2nd Division, 15th Army Corps, to June, 1865. Department of Arkansas to August, 1865.

On expiration of its term of service the original members (except veterans) were mustered out, and the organization, composed of veterans and recruits, retained in the service until August 7. 1865, when it was mustered out in accordance with orders from the War Department.

=== Detailed service ===
The 37th OVI's detailed service is as follows (NOTE — Battles are Bolded, Italicized; campaigns are Italicized):

==== 1861 ====
- Operations in the Kanawha District and New River Regiment, West Virginia, October 19-November 16, 1861.
- Duty at Clifton until March, 1862.

==== 1862 ====
- Expedition to Logan Court House and Guyandotte Valley January 12–23.
- Demonstrations against Virginia & Tennessee Railroad May 10–18.
- Actions at **Battle of Princeton Court House** May 15, 16 and 17.
- Charleston May 17.
- Moved to Flat Top Mountain and duty there until August.
- Moved to Raleigh Court House August 1.
- Operations about Wyoming Court House August 2–8.
- **Battle of Wyoming Court House** August 5.
- Operations in the Kanawha Valley August 29-September 18 (Kanawha Valley Campaign of 1862).
- **Repulse of Loring's attack on Fayetteville** September 10.
- **Battle of Cotton Hill** September 11.
- Charleston September 12–13.
- Duty at Point Pleasant until October 15, and at Gauley Bridge until December 20.
- Ordered to Napoleon, Ark., December 20

==== 1863 ====
- To Young's Point, La., January 21, 1863, and duty there until March.
- Expedition to Rolling Fork via Muddy, Steele's and Black Bayous and Deer Creek March 14–27.
- Demonstrations on Haines and Drumgould's Bluffs April 27-May 1.
- Movement to join army in rear of Vicksburg, Miss., via Richmond and Grand Gulf May 2–14.
- Siege of Vicksburg, Miss., May 18-July 4.
- **Assaults on Vicksburg** May 19 and 22.
- Advance on Jackson, Miss., July 5–10.
- **Siege of Jackson** July 10–17.
- Camp at Big Black until September 26.
- Moved to Memphis, thence march to Chattanooga, Tenn., September 26-November 21.
- Operations on the Memphis & Charleston Railroad in Alabama October 20–29.
- Bear Creek, Tuscumbia, October 27.
- Chattanooga-Ringgold Campaign November 23–27.
- Tunnel Hill November 24–25.
- **Battle of Missionary Ridge** November 25.
- March to relief of Knoxville November 29-December 8.

==== 1864 ====
- Regiment reenlisted at Larkinsville, Ala., February 9, 1864.
- Atlanta campaign May 1-September 8.
- Demonstrations on Resaca May 8–13.
- Near Resaca May 13.
- **Battle of Resaca** May 14–15.
- Advance on Dallas May 18–25.
- Operations on line of Pumpkin Vine Creek and battles about Dallas, New Hope Church, and Allatoona Hills May 25-June 5.
- **Battle of New Hope Church** May 25.
- Operations about Marietta and Kennesaw Mountain June 10-July 2.
- **Battle of Kennesaw Mountain** June 27.
- Nickajack Creek July 2–5.
- Ruff's Mills July 3–4.
- Chattahoochee River July 6–17.
- Siege of Atlanta July 22-August 25.
- **Battle of Atlanta** July 22.
- Operations at Chattahoochie River July 6–17.
- Ezra Chapel, Hood's 2nd Sortie, July 28.
- Flank movement on Jonesboro August 25–30.
- **Battle of Jonesboro** August 31-September 1.
- Lovejoy Station September 2–6.
- Operations against Hood in North Georgia and North Alabama September 29-November 3.
- Turkeytown and Gadsden Road October 25.
- March to the Sea November 15.
- Siege of Savannah December 10–21.
- **Fort McAllister** December 13.

==== 1865 ====
- Campaign of the Carolinas January to April, 1865.
- Salkehatchie Swamp, S.C., February 2–5.
- Cannon's Bridge, South Edisto River, February 8.
- North Edisto River February 12–13.
- Columbia February 16–17.
- **Battle of Bentonville**, N. C., March 20–21.
- Mill Creek March 22.
- Occupation of Goldsboro March 24.
- Advance on Raleigh April 10–14.
- Occupation of Raleigh April 14.
- Bennett's House April 26.
- Surrender of Johnston and his army.
- March to Washington, D.C., via Richmond, Va., April 29-May 20.
- Grand Review May 24.
- Moved to Louisville, Ky., June; thence to Little Rock, Ark., and duty there until August.
- Mustered out August 7, 1865.

== Medal of Honor recipients ==
Ten men earned the Medal of Honor while serving with the 37th Ohio. Six were awarded the medal for their actions on May 22, 1863, during the Siege of Vicksburg:

- Private Joseph Hanks — Rescuing a wounded comrade and five others
- Corporal Franz Frey — Participating in a diversionary "forlorn hope" attack on Confederate defenses, 22 May 1863.
- Private Sampson Harris — Participating in the same "forlorn hope."
- Private William John — Participating in the same "forlorn hope."
- Corporal Louis Renninger — Participating in the same "forlorn hope."
- Private Frederick Rock — Participating in the same "forlorn hope."
- Corporal Christian Schnell — Participating in the same "forlorn hope."

At the Battle of Missionary Ridge on November 25, 1863:

- Musician John S. Kountz — picked up a rifle and joined the attack, and was seriously wounded
- Private William Schmidt — subsequently rescued Kountz from under heavy fire.

The regiment's last medal was earned on July 28, 1864, during the Battle of Ezra Church:

- Sergeant Ernst Torgler — Saved the badly wounded commanding officer, Major Charles Hipp, from capture.

== Casualties ==
The regiment lost during service 9 Officers and 102 Enlisted men killed and mortally wounded, and 1 Officer and 94 Enlisted men by disease for a total of 206 fatalities.

== Commander ==
- Colonel Edward Siber. (Entered service: September 12, 1861; Resigned: March 23, 1864.)

== See also ==
- List of Ohio Civil War units
- Ohio in the Civil War
