= Paul Vandervoort =

- Born: July 12, 1846; Clinton County, Ohio
- Died: July 29, 1902 (aged 56); Puerto Principe, Cuba
- Burial place: Forest Lawn Memorial Park, Omaha, Nebraska
- Military career
- Allegiance: United States of America; Union
- Branch: United States Army; Union Army
- Service years: 1862, 1863–1865
- Rank: Sergeant
- Units: Company G, 68th Illinois Volunteer Infantry (3-month regiment); Company M, 16th Illinois Volunteer Cavalry
- Conflicts: American Civil War
- Other work: Railway Mail Service (chief clerk), politician, 11th Commander-in-Chief of the Grand Army of the Republic, land speculator

Paul Vandervoort (July 12, 1846 – July 29, 1902) was an American soldier of Belgian descent who served in the Union Army and as the 11th Commander-in-Chief of the Grand Army of the Republic, 1882-1883.

== Early life and military career ==
Vandervoort was born July 12, 1846, in Clinton County, Ohio, to William and Theresa (Harvey) Vandervoort.

During the Civil War, he lied about his age and enlisted June 10, 1862, as a private in Company G, 68th Illinois Volunteer Infantry (a 3-month regiment). Vandervoort was mustered out September 26, 1862, at Camp Butler near Springfield, Illinois. On May 19, 1863, he enlisted as a private in Company M, 16th Illinois Volunteer Cavalry (again, lying about his age) and mustered out of the service August 1, 1865, as a sergeant. While with the 16th Illinois Cavalry, Vandervoort was captured by Confederates near Jonesville, Virginia, in December 1863 and held at Andersonville Prison in Georgia, and Belle Isle and Libby prisons in Richmond, Virginia.

== Post-war service ==
Following the Civil War, Vandervoort became active in politics, first in Illinois and later in Omaha, Nebraska, where he also worked as chief clerk for the Railway Mail Service. Like many other Union Army veterans, Vandervoort was a Republican; however, he later switched his political affiliation to the Populist Party.

Vandervoort became active in the Grand Army of the Republic in 1866 and helped reorganize the Department of Nebraska after the organizations' initial difficulties. He was elected 11th Commander-in-Chief of the G.A.R. and served 1882-1883. Of particular note is that Vandervoort was the first veteran who had been an enlisted man to rise to the highest position within the G.A.R.. At the 1883 National Encampment, the National Woman's Relief Corps was recognized as an official auxiliary organization of the G.A.R. and Vandervoort was made an honorary member.

When Vandervoort lost his position with the Railway Mail Service, he became an assistant manager for the Cuban Land and Steamship Company of New York. Vandervoort helped transport many Union Army veterans who hoped to find new lives as citrus farmers in Cuba after the United States installed a government there in 1899. Vandervoort became a land speculator and personally laid out a colony known as La Gloria, which became the largest American settlement in Cuba.

Vandervoort did not live to see La Gloria prosper; and it did not. He died July 29, 1902, in Puerto Principe, Cuba, and is buried at Forest Lawn Memorial Park in Omaha.

== See also ==
- List of Grand Army of the Republic commanders-in-chief

Political offices
| Preceded by George Sargent Merrill | Commander-in-Chief of the Grand Army of the Republic; 1882 – 1883 | Succeeded by Robert Burns Beath |
