= United States Zouave Cadets =

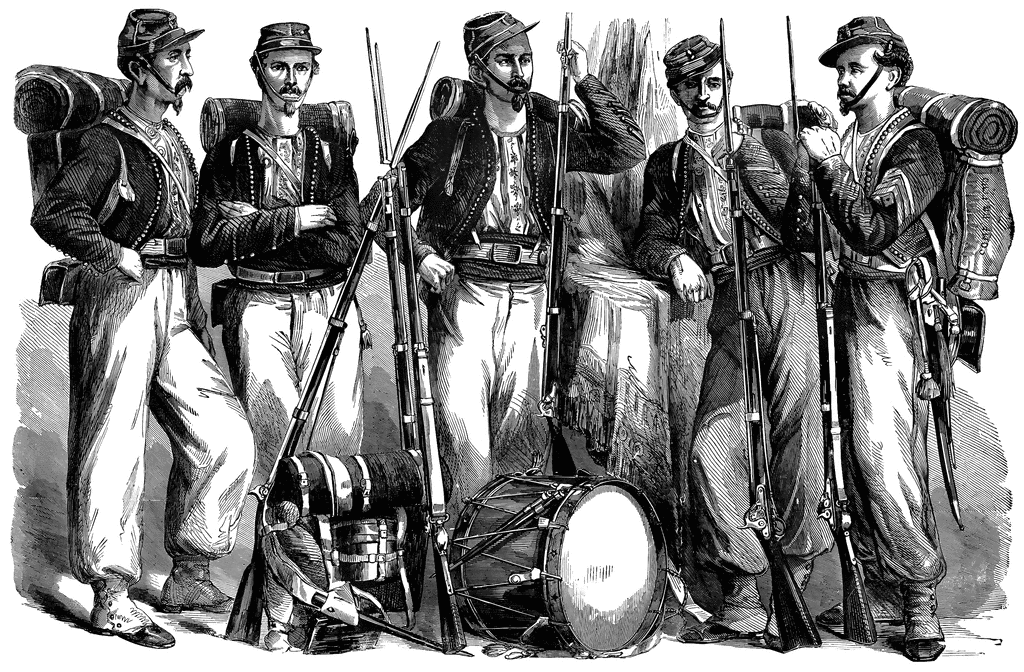
- Active: 1856–1861
- Country: United States
- Allegiance: Illinois
- Branch: Militia
- Type: Zouave infantry
- Role: Foot guards
- Size: 61 soldiers, 15 musicians (1860)
- Armory: Garrett Block (Chicago, Illinois)
- Nickname: Governor's Guard of Illinois (Note: Illinois Governor William Henry Bissell named the Zouave Cadets the "Governor's Guard". His successor Governor Wood chose the Quincy City Guards as the executive escort.)
- March: "Zouave Cadets Quickstep" (A. J. Vaas)

Commanders
- Notable commanders: Elmer Ellsworth

The United States Zouave Cadets (also known as the Chicago Zouaves and Zouave Cadets of Chicago) was a short-lived zouave unit of the Illinois militia that has been credited as the force behind the surge in popularity of zouave infantry in the United States and Confederate States in the mid-19th century. The United States Zouave Cadets were formed by Elmer Ellsworth in 1856 from the National Guard Cadets of Chicago, established three years earlier. The unit's 1860 tour of the eastern United States popularized the distinctive zouave appearance and customs, directly and indirectly inspiring the formation of dozens of similar units on the eve of the American Civil War.

During the governorship of William Henry Bissell, the United States Zouave Cadets were granted the ceremonial designation of Governor's Guard of Illinois on 23 January 1860. Its march was the "Zouave Cadets Quickstep".

== History ==
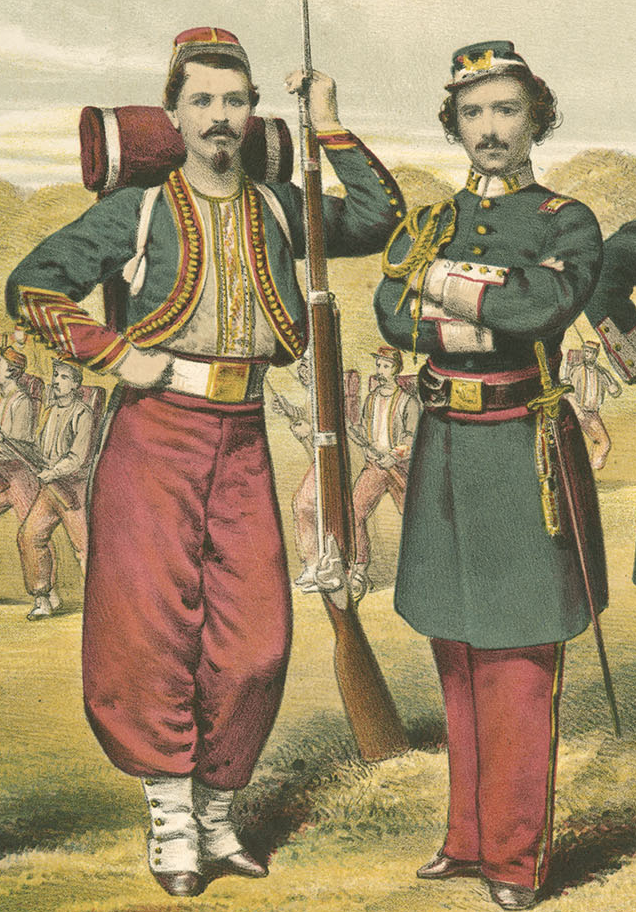
Elmer Ellsworth was credited with transforming the moribund National Guard Cadets of Chicago into the United States Zouave Cadets.

=== Background ===
In the years following the War of 1812, many northern states defunded and demobilized their militias. (Note: Southern states, meanwhile, continued to maintain robust military forces due to the ever present fear of a slave uprising.) In their place, units of volunteer militia organized themselves. These units, often drawn from members of society, elected their own officers, adopted their own uniforms and customs, and generally financed themselves. Well-drilled and commanded units could petition for recognition by their state government; if approved, their officers would be issued commissions by the Governor and their troops permitted access to the state's armories and munitions stores, all while maintaining their otherwise independent character. Nevertheless, such volunteer militia companies of this period – despite forming a nucleus around which a state could build and expand its military forces in an emergency – were characterized by Phil Reyburn, an historian, as "more fraternal than martial". A far greater emphasis was placed on drill and ceremony than on battlefield tactics.

The National Guard Cadets of Chicago was formed as a volunteer militia company on March 19, 1856, under commanding officer Captain Joseph R. Scott. After three years, however, its strength sat at just 15 men.

=== Under command of Elmer Ellsworth ===
While commanding officer of the Rockford Greys militia company, Elmer Ellsworth introduced his men to drills inspired by those used by French zouave units. Ellsworth, himself, had been introduced to zouave military customs by his fencing instructor, Charles A. De Villiers, a French physician, immigrant, and veteran of a zouave unit during the Crimean War. In 1859, soldiers of the National Guard Cadets of Chicago saw the Rockford Greys performing zouave-inspired drills and offered Ellsworth command of their unit. Ellsworth accepted the offer, transforming the National Guard Cadets of Chicago into the United States Zouave Cadets.

"The members of the corps, with one exception, are all young men of extraordinary muscular power, and there is not one member who is not a gentleman as well as a soldier. The drill is most arduous, but; notwithstanding, every movement, no matter how complex, is executed to perfection."

— The New York Times reporting on the United States Zouave Cadets' exhibition in New York City in July 1860

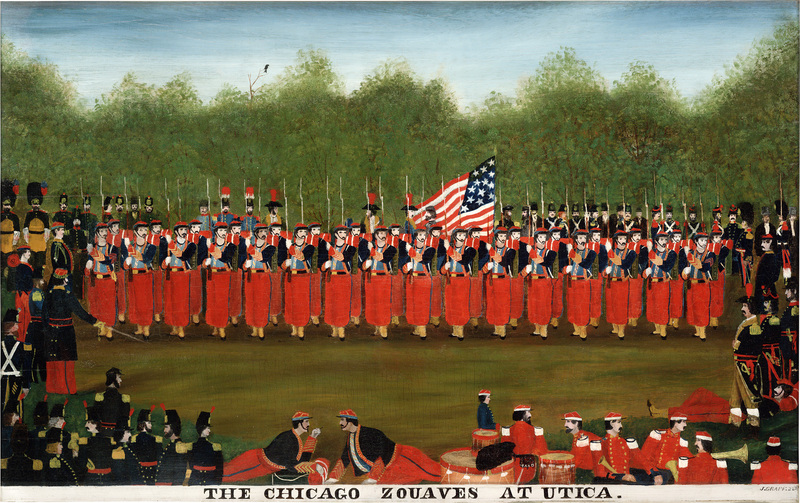
An oil painting showing the Chicago Zouaves in Utica, New York during their 1860 national tour

The trio section of the "Zouave Cadets Quickstep", performed on piano

On July 4, 1859, the United States Zouave Cadets – now 46 members strong – first publicly appeared in their new Zouave uniforms and executed the unique Franco-Algerian Zouave drill in front of Chicago's Tremont Hall. With a training schedule of three evenings per week, (Note: According to another source, drill occurred daily except Sunday.) the United States Zouave Cadets established a reputation for parade ground excellence, described by one observer as "unsurpassed this side of West Point". The United States Zouave Cadets saw their biggest audience, estimated to be 70,000 in number, the following September during the seventh annual United States Agricultural Society Fair which was hosted by Chicago.

In March 1860, the invalid and partially paralyzed Governor of Illinois, William Henry Bissell, succumbed to pneumonia. The Zouave Cadets formed part of the military escort during Bissell's state funeral, occupying a position in the cortège between the Quincy City Guards and a volunteer company of veterans of the Mexican–American War. Having previously been named as the Governor's Guard of Illinois by Governor Bissell on January 23, 1860, the Zouave Cadets were also given the task of firing three volleys during the interment.

That May the unit was again in the public spotlight when it executed its exotic drill and maneuver for the 1860 Republican National Convention, held that year in Chicago.

==== The 1860 tour ====
In July 1860, the unit undertook a tour of the eastern United States, appearing in parades and performing exhibition drills in Adrian, Michigan; Detroit, Michigan; Cleveland, Ohio; Buffalo, New York, Rochester, New York; Utica, New York; Troy, New York; Albany, New York; New York, New York; and Boston, Massachusetts. A crowd of tens of thousands turned-out to watch the unit's parade through the streets of New York City.

Their tour closed with exhibition drills for General Winfield Scott at West Point, for President of the United States James Buchanan at the White House, and in one final public appearance in Pittsburgh, Pennsylvania.

=== Later history ===
The United States Zouave Cadets effectively ceased to exist with the outbreak of the American Civil War in 1861, most of its personnel scattering to other units. In April 1861 – following the capitulation of Fort Sumter and in response to Abraham Lincoln's call for an initial mobilization of 75,000 volunteers – officers of the United States Zouave Cadets raised three separate zouave companies each comprising between 80 and 89 men, which were integrated into the 19th Illinois Infantry Regiment.

Ellsworth, who had worked on Abraham Lincoln's campaign in the 1860 U.S. presidential election, took command of the 11th New York Infantry, New York's so-called "Fire Zouaves". On May 24, 1861 — the day following the ratification of Virginia's Ordinance of Secession — federal forces, among them the Fire Zouaves, seized the city of Alexandria, Virginia. Ellsworth was shot and killed by innkeeper James Jackson while confiscating a Confederate States flag that had been flying from the roof of Jackson's establishment, thereby becoming the first fatality among Union officers in the war. Ellsworth's national reputation earned as the head of the Chicago Zouaves inspired a period of national mourning; according to Adam Goodheart, it was "Ellsworth's death, even more than the attack on Sumter, that made Northerners ready not just to take up arms, but to kill". Ellsworth's remains were placed in repose in the White House while a New York Times war correspondent reported that the entire city of Alexandria faced the possibility of being razed "from the uncontrollable fury of the troops" of Ellsworth's regiment. Later efforts in New York, Ellsworth's home state, resulted in the raising of a regiment of zouaves to avenge his death; that unit, the 44th New York Volunteer Infantry Regiment, was known as "Ellsworth's Avengers". A.J. Vaas, composer of the Chicago Zouave's unit march, wrote a requiem that year titled the "Ellsworth Requiem" in commemoration of the officer's death.

De Villiers, the French physician and veteran of the Crimean War who had originally inspired Ellsworth's interest in zouaves, was later employed as an informal inspector of the Camp Dennison recruiting post. He was described in one account by a Camp Dennison soldier as "a dapper little gentleman of very dark complexion". The 11th Ohio Infantry later elected De Villiers its commander and he was commissioned a colonel.

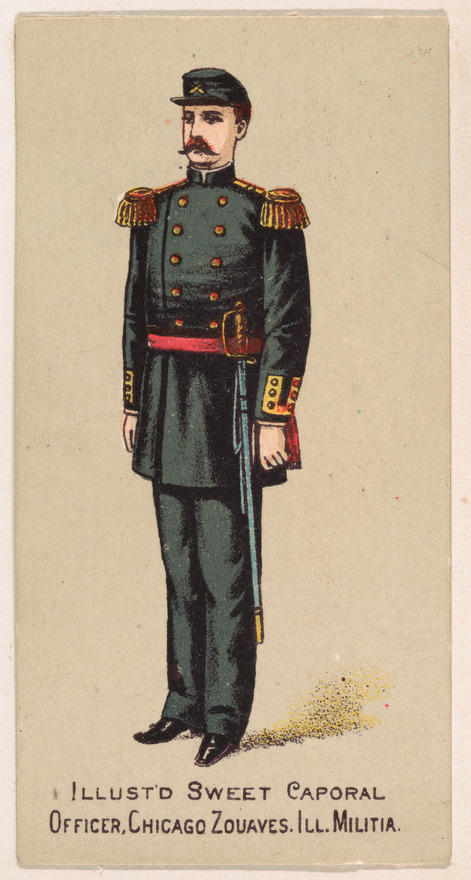
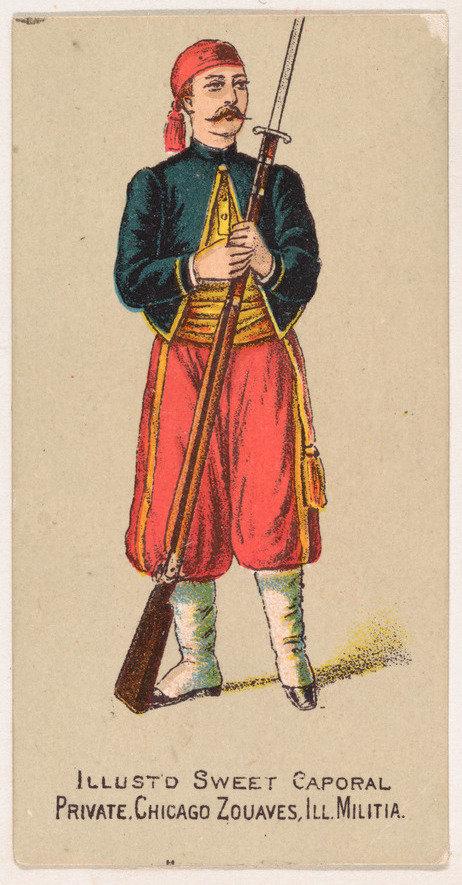
Lithographs from c. 1888 cigarette cards issued by the Kinney Tobacco Company shows officer and enlisted uniforms of the Chicago Zouaves

== Uniforms ==
The Chicago Zouaves had uniforms that borrowed heavily from, without strictly copying, French Zouaves from which they drew inspiration. Enlisted men in the Chicago Zouaves wore uniforms that consisted of red kepi, red chasseur trousers with white gaiters, and an open-fronted, beaded blue blouse worn with a yellow waist sash. Officer uniforms consisted of straight-legged trousers and blue blouses with choker collars. The loose-fitting chasseur trousers worn by enlisted personnel allowed greater fluidity of movement than traditional, straight-legged trousers allowing them to perform their drill movements.

== Unit march ==
The "Zouave Cadets Quickstep" by A.J. Vaas was registered for copyright on April 13, 1860; sheet music to the march was published by Root & Candy. It became briefly popular, with the Chicago Daily Herald reporting that the publisher was – by August – receiving "daily orders in the hundreds" for it. It was included in the Caxton Club's 2018 volume Chicago by the Book: 101 Publications That Shaped the City and Its Image.

== Legacy ==
The popularity of the public appearances undertaken by the United States Zouave Cadets during their 1860 national tour helped inspire the formation of additional zouave units in other states. Writing in 1910 James Gross, a veteran of the Albany Zouave Cadets (Company A, 10th New York Infantry), recalled that the demonstration drill of the Chicago Zouaves in Albany "aroused such enthusiasm among my young friends and companions that we held a meeting on the upper floor of the Bank of Albany building, located on Broadway, and then and there decided to form a company to be known as the Albany Zouave Cadets, to drill and contest the honors with the Chicago Cadets, not dreaming of the great Rebellion which was soon to follow" [sic].

During the American Civil War, more than 50 zouave units existed in the Union Army alone, with additional zouave forces raised by the Confederate States. However, units inspired by the Chicago Zouaves later found the zouave uniform impractical in combat conditions with the colorful chasseur trousers making easy targets of their wearers. During the American Civil War, zouave units soon switched to more conventional uniforms, though, in the post-war era zouave-style uniforms gradually reappeared among some militia. (Note: Onc exception to the abandonment of zouave-style uniforms early in the war was the 3rd Brigade of V Corps, all of whose regiments were clothed in zouave-style uniforms in the later period of the conflict. The 3rd Brigade was the only zouave brigade in the federal army.)

== See also ==
- 114th Pennsylvania Infantry Regiment
- Papal Zouaves
- Zouaves of Death
