= Thomas G. Lawler =

British-born American soldier

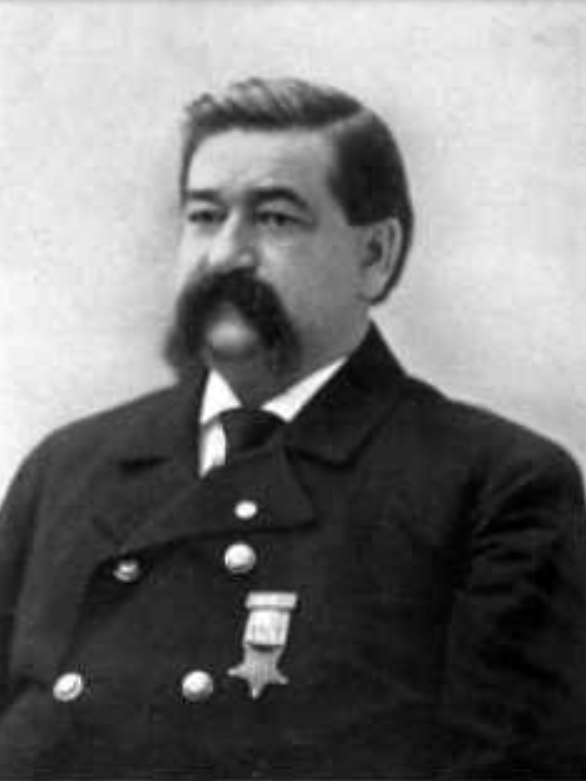
- Born: April 7, 1844; Liverpool, England, United Kingdom
- Died: February 3, 1908 (aged 63); Rockford, Illinois
- Burial place: Cedar Bluff Cemetery, Rockford, Illinois
- Military career
- Allegiance: United States of America; Union
- Branch: United States Army; Union Army; Illinois National Guard
- Service years: 1861–1864; 1877-1907
- Rank: 2nd Lieutenant
- Units: Company E, 19th Illinois Volunteer Infantry
- Commands: Colonel, 3rd Regiment Illinois National Guard (1877-1892)
- Conflicts: American Civil War: Battle of Stones River; Tullahoma Campaign; Battle of Chickamauga; Battle of Missionary Ridge; Atlanta campaign; Battle of Resaca; Battle of Dallas; Battle of New Hope Church; Battle of Allatoona
- Other work: 23rd Commander-in-Chief of the Grand Army of the Republic, lumber business, coal business, insurance business, postmaster

Thomas G. Lawler (April 7, 1844 – February 3, 1908) was a British-born American soldier who served in the Union Army during the American Civil War and as the 23rd Commander-in-Chief of the Grand Army of the Republic from 1894 to 1895.

== Early life and military career ==
Lawler was born April 1844 in Liverpool, England, to Patrick and Jane (Jones) Lawler. He moved to the United States with his family when he was a young boy. The family settled in Rockford, Illinois, and he was educated in the schools there.

Lawler enlisted at age 17 on September 17, 1861, as a private in Company E, 19th Illinois Volunteer Infantry and was immediately promoted to corporal. He served with the regiment for three years and rose through the ranks, being promoted to sergeant March 1, 1863, and mustered out of the service as a 2nd lieutenant. Lawler was elected to 1st lieutenant, but never received the promotion. He is credited with being the first man of the 19th Illinois infantry over the Confederate works at the Battle of Missionary Ridge while carrying the regiment's colors.

== Post-war service ==
Lawler was a charter member of Colonel Garrett L. Nevins G.A.R. Post #1 in Rockford and remained an active member for 40 years; he served Post Commander, 1868-1870, 1882, and 1907. On September 28, 1877, he joined Company B, 3rd Illinois National Guard as its captain. Lawler was promoted to colonel, effective October 15, 1886. He stepped down as commander in 1892 to allow younger men the opportunity to command the regiment, although he remained on active duty with the regiment until placed on the retired list January 17, 1907.

He was elected 23rd Commander-in-Chief of the Grand Army of the Republic and served 1894-1895. During his term, Lawler worked with the U.S. War Department to help reverse dishonorable discharges of Civil War veterans whose discharges were deemed unjust. Additionally, he sought protection for Civil War veterans who were still in the service of the U.S. Army or Navy from being unjustly dishonorably discharged.

He was active in civic duties in Rockford and worked to have a memorial hall built in Rockford that was dedicated to veterans of all U.S. wars. Construction began in 1901 on Memorial Hall and in 1903 it was dedicated by President Theodore Roosevelt.

Lawler's business activities included serving as president of the Rockford Lumber & Fuel Company and president of the Forest City Insurance Company. He was appointed postmaster of Rockford by President Rutherford B. Hayes and served continuously until 1893.

Lawler died September 3, 1908, at his home in Rockford and is buried there in Cedar Bluff Cemetery.

== See also ==
- List of Grand Army of the Republic commanders-in-chief

Political offices
Preceded by John G. B. Adams	Commander-in-Chief of the Grand Army of the Republic; 1894 – 1895	Succeeded by Ivan N. Walker
