= Battery A, 1st Illinois Light Artillery Regiment =

- Illinois flag
- Active: April 17, 1861 to July 3, 1865
- Country: United States
- Allegiance: Union
- Branch: Artillery
- Engagements: Fall of Fort Donelson; Battle of Shiloh; Battle of Port Gibson; Battle of Raymond; Battle of Jackson; Battle of Champion Hill; Siege of Vicksburg; Battle of Kennesaw Mountain; Battle of Atlanta; Battle of Nashville

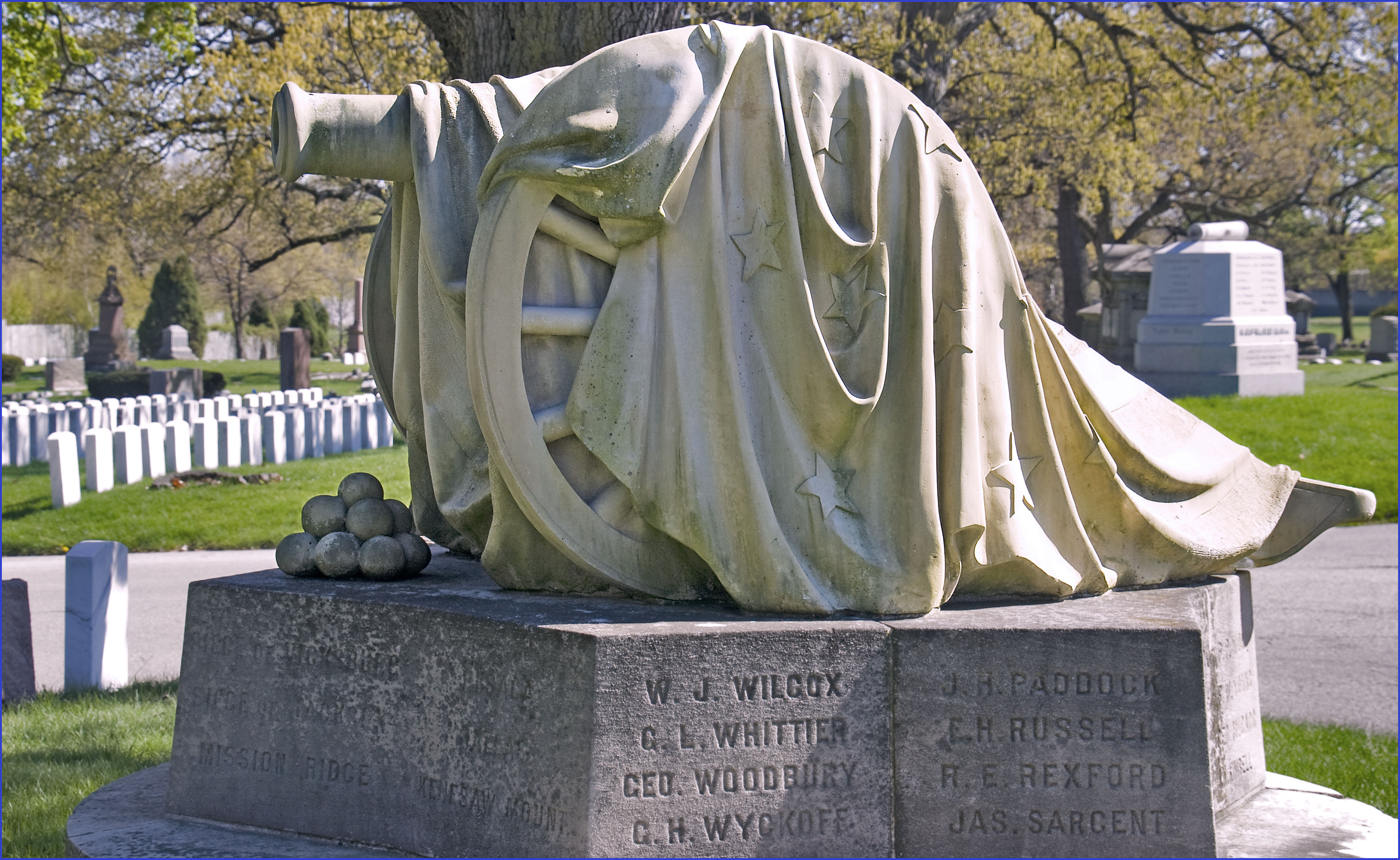
Battery A, Chicago Light Artillery Monument by Leonard Volk at Rosehill Cemetery, Chicago, Illinois

Battery A, 1st Illinois Light Artillery Regiment, originally known as Smith's Chicago Light Artillery, was an artillery battery that served in the Union Army during the American Civil War.

== Service ==
Battery A was mustered into service at Chicago, Illinois on April 17, 1861 for three months state service. The battery was reorganized for three years Federal service as Battery A on July 16, 1861.

The battery was mustered out on July 3, 1865.

== Total strength and casualties ==
The battery lost 15 enlisted men who were killed in action or who died of their wounds and 22 enlisted men who died of disease, for a total of 37 fatalities.

== Commanders ==
- Captain James Smith - resigned November 27, 1861.
- Captain Charles M. Willard - promoted to major.
- Captain Francis Morgan - mustered out May 24, 1862.
- Captain Peter P. Wood - mustered out July 23, 1864.

== See also ==
- List of Illinois Civil War Units
- Illinois in the American Civil War
