= Oaks Corners, New York =

- Hamlet
- Location within New York Location within the United States
- Coordinates: 42°55′56″N 77°00′45″W
- Country: United States
- State: New York
- County: Ontario
- Elevation: 492 ft (150 m)
- Time zone: UTC-5 (Eastern (EST))
  - Summer (DST): UTC-4 (EDT)
- ZIP code: 14518
- Area codes: 315 & 680
- GNIS feature ID: 959179

Oaks Corners is a hamlet in Ontario County, New York, United States. The community is 4.7 miles (7.6 km) north-northwest of Geneva. Oaks Corners has a post office with ZIP code 14518.
