= Joseph Hanks (soldier) =

- Born: April 22, 1843; Chillicothe, Ohio
- Died: December 28, 1922 (aged 86); North Bend, Nebraska
- Burial place: North Bend, Nebraska
- Military career
- Allegiance: United States
- Branch: United States Army; Union Army
- Service years: 1862–1863
- Rank: Private
- Unit: 37th Ohio Infantry
- Conflicts: American Civil War • Siege of Vicksburg
- Awards: Medal of Honor

Joseph Hanks (March 22, 1843 – December 28, 1922) was a Union Army soldier during the American Civil War. He received the Medal of Honor for gallantry during the Siege of Vicksburg on May 22, 1863.

== Union assault ==
On May 22, 1863, General Ulysses S. Grant ordered an assault on the Confederate heights at Vicksburg, Mississippi. The plan called for a storming party of volunteers to build a bridge across a moat and plant scaling ladders against the enemy embankment in advance of the main attack. The volunteers knew the odds were against survival and the mission was called, in nineteenth century vernacular, a "forlorn hope". Only single men were accepted as volunteers and even then, twice as many men as needed came forward and were turned away. The assault began in the early morning following a naval bombardment.

The Union soldiers came under enemy fire immediately and were pinned down in the ditch they were to cross. Despite repeated attacks by the main Union body, the men of the forlorn hope were unable to retreat until nightfall. Of the 150 men in the storming party, nearly half were killed. Seventy-nine of the survivors were awarded the Medal of Honor.

== Medal of Honor ==
During the battle, Joseph Hanks braved heavy fire to carry his wounded comrade and childhood friend Antone Eppenhauer to safety before returning to the fighting. Eppenhauer lost touch with Hanks, but tracked him down almost 30 years later, and related his story to federal officials, who awarded Hanks the Medal of Honor in 1917.

His citation reads:

Voluntarily and under fire went to the rescue of a wounded comrade lying between the lines, gave him water, and brought him off the field.

== See also ==
- Siege of Vicksburg
- Vicksburg campaign
- List of American Civil War Medal of Honor recipients: G-L
- Vicksburg Union order of battle
