= 3rd Arkansas Cavalry Regiment (Union) =

3rd Regiment Arkansas Volunteer Cavalry
- Active: February, 1864–August 20, 1865
- Disbanded: August 20, 1865
- Country: United States
- Allegiance: Union
- Branch: Cavalry
- Size: Regiment
- Engagements: American Civil War Camden Expedition Battle of Prairie D'Ane Battle of Camden Battle of Marks' Mills Battle of Jenkins' Ferry

The 3rd Regiment Arkansas Volunteer Cavalry (1864–1865) was a cavalry regiment that served in the Union Army during the American Civil War. Although Arkansas joined the Confederate States of America in 1861, not all of its citizens supported secession. Arkansas formed 11 regiments that served in the Union Army.

== Organization ==
The 3rd Regiment Arkansas Cavalry regiment was formed in October 1863 in Little Rock, Arkansas and was officially mustered in on February 10, 1864. Parts of the regiment originated from the Arkansas River Valley, with a company each from Lewisburg, Arkansas, and Yell County, Arkansas. Attached to Post of Little Rock, Ark., 7th Army Corps, Dept. Arkansas, to May, 1864. 3rd Brigade, 2nd Division, 7th Army Corps, to September, 1864. 4th Brigade, Cavalry Division, 7th Army Corps, to February, 1865. Post of Lewisburg, Ark., 7th Army Corps, to August, 1865.

== Service ==
The 3rd Regiment Arkansas Volunteer Cavalry was involved in the following Operations: Operations in northwest Arkansas January 16-February 15, 1864. Expedition from Batesville to near Searcy Landing, Arkansas, January 30-February 3, 1864 (detachment). Dardanelle, Arkansas, March 15–17, 1864. Steele's Camden Expedition, March 23-May 3, 1864. Skirmishes on Benton Road, Arkansas, March 23–24, 1864. Skirmishes at Rockport and Dover, Arkansas, March 25, 1864. Skirmish at Quitman, Arkansas, March 26, 1864. Skirmish at Arkadelphia, Arkansas, March 29, 1864. Skirmish near Camden, Arkansas, March 30, 1864. Action at Spoonville and Terre Noir Creek, Arkansas, April 2, 1864. Skirmish at Okolona, Arkansas, April 2–3, 1863. Engagement at Elkin's Ferry on Little Missouri River, Arkansas, April 3–4, 1864. Battle of Prairie D'Ane, Arkansas, April 9–12, 1864. Camden, Arkansas, April 15–18, 1864. Battle of Marks' Mills, Arkansas, April 25, 1864. Battle of Jenkins' Ferry on Saline River, Arkansas, April 30, 1864. Operations against Shelby north of Arkansas River May 13–31, 1864. Skirmish at Cypress Creek, Arkansas, May 13, 1864. Skirmish at Princeton, Arkansas, May 27, 1864. Stationed at Lewisburg, Arkansas, until September, 1864. Skirmish at Lewisburg, Arkansas, June 10, 1864. Scout from Lewisburg, Arkansas, June 20–23, 1864. Operations against guerrillas in Arkansas, July 1–31, 1864. Skirmish in Searcy County, Arkansas, July 4, 1864. Skirmish at Petit Jean on Arkansas River, Arkansas, July 10, 1864. Skirmish near Pine Bluff, Arkansas, July 22, 1864 (detachment). Scout in Yell County, Arkansas, July 25-August 11, 1864 (detachment). Operations in central Arkansas and skirmishes, August 9–15, 1864. Skirmish near Dardanelle, Arkansas, August 30, 1864. Skirmish near Beattie's Mill, Arkansas, September 1, 1864. Skirmish near Quitman, Arkansas, September 2, 1864. Operations about Lewisburg, Arkansas, September 6–8, 1864. Skirmish at Norristown, Arkansas, September 6, 1864. Skirmishes at Point Remove, Arkansas, September 7–8, 1864. Skirmish near Glass Village, Arkansas, September 8, 1864. Scout to Norristown and Russellville, Arkansas, September 9–12, 1864 (Co. “D”). Ordered to Little Rock, Arkansas, September 10, 1864, and duty there until February, 1865. Expedition from Little Rock to Fort Smith, Arkansas, September 25-October 13, 1864 (detachment). Affair at Clarksville, Arkansas, September 28, 1864. Skirmish at White Oak Creek, Arkansas, September 29, 1864. Skirmish at Clarksville, Arkansas, October 9, 1864. Reconnaissance from Little Rock toward Monticello and Mt. Elba, Arkansas, October 4–11, 1864. Expedition to Fort Smith, Arkansas, November 5–23, 1864. Skirmish near Cypress Creek in Perry County, Arkansas, December 1, 1864 (Co. “C”). Skirmish in Perry County, Arkansas, December 3, 1864. Operations in Arkansas, January 1–27, 1865. Skirmish at Dardanelle, Arkansas, January 14, 1865. Skirmish at Ivey's Ford, Arkansas, January 17, 1865. Skirmish at Boggs’ Mills, Arkansas, January 24, 1865. Duty at Lewisburg, Arkansas, and operations against guerrillas in that vicinity until August, 1865. Skirmish near Lewisburg, Arkansas, February 12, 1865. Scout from Lewisburg, Arkansas, into Yell and Searcy counties March 12–23, 1865.

== Mustered out of service ==
The regiment was mustered out August 20, 1865.

== See also ==
- List of Arkansas Civil War Union units
- List of United States Colored Troops Civil War Units
- Arkansas in the American Civil War
