= John S. Kountz =

Union Army Medal of Honor recipient

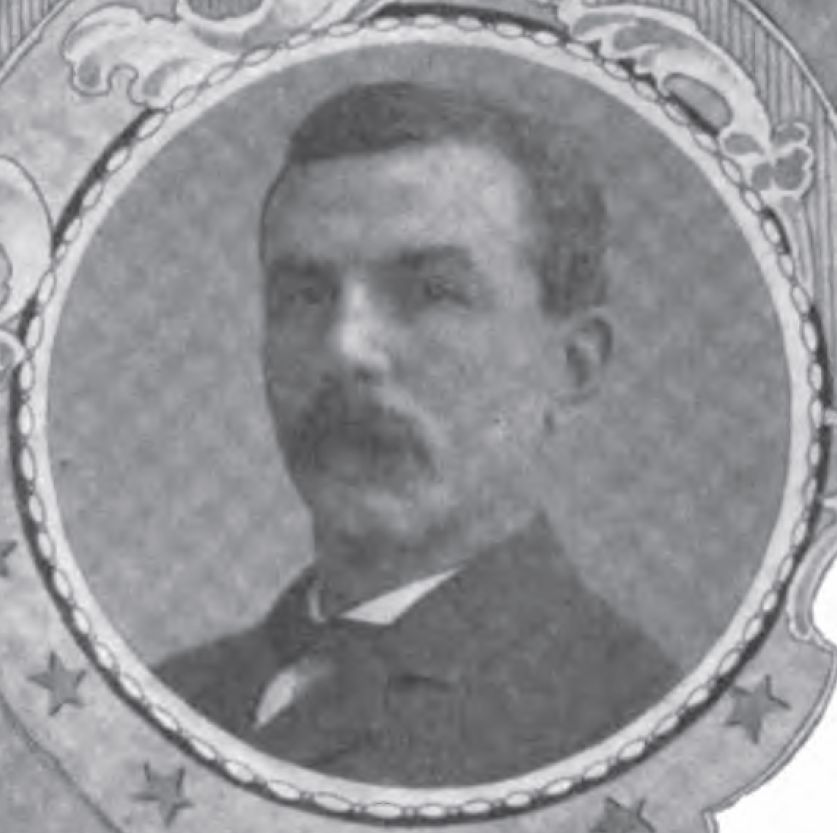
- John S. Kountz
- Born: March 25, 1846; Richfield, Ohio, US
- Died: June 14, 1909 (aged 63); Toledo, Ohio, US
- Burial place: Calvary Cemetery, Toledo
- Military career
- Allegiance: United States of America; Union
- Branch: United States Navy; Union Army
- Service years: 1861 - 1864
- Rank: Musician
- Unit: 37th Ohio Infantry
- Conflicts: American Civil War
- Awards: Medal of Honor

John S. Kountz (March 25, 1846 – June 14, 1909) was a soldier in the United States Army during the American Civil War. He received a Medal of Honor.

== Biography ==
"Our Veterans and Their Commanders," a caricature of California Grand Army of the Republic members published in The Wasp, April 25, 1885. Kountz stands third from left.

Kountz was born March 25, 1846, in Richfield, Ohio. He attended school in Maumee, Ohio, until the age of fourteen, and in September 1861 enlisted as a drummer boy in the 37th Ohio Infantry. At the Battle of Missionary Ridge, when the drum corps was ordered to the rear, he threw away his drum, seized a musket, and was severely wounded in the first assault, being left in the field under the enemy's guns until he was rescued by his company. This episode was the subject of a poem by Kate B. Sherwood, entitled "The Drummer-Boy of Mission Ridge", which attained a wide reputation. He remained at a hospital in Louisville, Kentucky, until he was honorably discharged from the service on April 25, 1864.

On his return to civil life he attended school for one year, after which he was treasurer of Lucas County, Ohio, 1872–1874, and county recorder 1875-1878. He was connected with the Grand Army of the Republic since its organization in 1866, and was elected 13th Commander-in-Chief on July 25, 1884. In the presidential contest that occurred during his official term, he issued an order to bar politics from this organization. He later became president of the Toledo Fire Underwriters' Association.

== See also ==
- List of Medal of Honor recipients
- List of American Civil War Medal of Honor recipients: G–L
- List of Grand Army of the Republic commanders-in-chief

Political offices
Preceded by Robert Burns Beath	Commander-in-Chief of the Grand Army of the Republic; 1884 – 1885	Succeeded by Samuel Swinfin Burdett
