= 156th Illinois Infantry Regiment =

156th Regiment Illinois Volunteer Infantry
- Illinois flag
- Active: February 16, 1865, to September 20, 1865
- Country: United States
- Allegiance: Union
- Branch: Infantry
- Engagements: None

The 156th Regiment Illinois Volunteer Infantry was an infantry regiment that served in the Union Army during the American Civil War.

== Service ==
The 156th Illinois Infantry was mustered into Federal service on February 16, 1865, for one year's service.

The regiment would primarily conduct guard and post duties on the Department of the Cumberland Until September.

The regiment was mustered out on September 20, 1865.

== Total strength and casualties ==
The regiment suffered 2 enlisted men killed in action or mortally wounded and 24 enlisted men who died of disease, for a total of 26 fatalities.

== Commanders ==
- Colonel Alfred T. Smith - discharged with the regiment

== See also ==
- List of Illinois Civil War Units
- Illinois in the American Civil War
