= List of Grand Army of the Republic commanders-in-chief =

The Grand Army of the Republic (GAR) was a fraternal organization composed of veterans of the Union Army, U.S. Navy, U.S. Marines and U.S. Revenue Cutter Service who served in the American Civil War. Founded on April 6, 1866 in Springfield, Illinois on the principles of "Fraternity, Charity and Loyalty" by Benjamin Franklin Stephenson, it was dissolved in 1956 when its last member died.

Linking men through their experience of the war, the GAR became among the first organized advocacy group in American politics, supporting voting rights for black veterans, lobbying the US Congress to establish veterans' pensions, and supporting Republican political candidates. Its peak membership, at more than 400,000, was in 1890. It was succeeded by the Sons of Union Veterans of the Civil War (SUVCW), composed of male descendants of Union veterans.

The GAR initially grew and prospered as a de facto political arm of the Republican Party during the heated political contests of the Reconstruction era. The commemoration of Union veterans, black and white, immediately became entwined with partisan politics. When the Republican Party's commitment to reform in the South gradually decreased, the GAR's mission became ill-defined and the organization floundered. The GAR almost disappeared in the early 1870s, and many divisions ceased to exist.

In the 1880s, the organization revived under new leadership that provided a platform for renewed growth, by advocating federal pensions for veterans. As the organization revived, black veterans joined in significant numbers and organized local posts. The national organization, however, failed to press the case for pensions for black soldiers. Most black troops never received any pension or remuneration for wounds incurred during their service.

The GAR was organized into "Departments" at the state level and "Posts" at the community level, and military-style uniforms were worn by its members. There were posts in every state in the U.S., and several posts overseas.

Commanders-in-Chief were elected by the membership at the National Encampments for one year terms. Several Commanders-in-Chief were re-elected for additional terms.

== Grand Army of the Republic commanders-in chief ==
Image	Name	Term start	Term end	Home department	Notes
	Benjamin F. Stephenson	1866	1866	Illinois	Founder and provisional Commander-in-Chief, April 6-November 21, 1866.
	Stephen Augustus Hurlbut	1866	1868	Illinois	
	John Alexander Logan	1868	1871	Illinois	Issued General Order No. 11 on May 5, 1868 designating Decoration Day as May 30. It ultimately became a national holiday and today is known as Memorial Day, the final Monday in the month of May.
	Ambrose Everett Burnside	1871	1873	Rhode Island	
	Charles Devens	1873	1875	Massachusetts	
	John Frederick Hartranft	1875	1877	Pennsylvania	
	John Cleveland Robinson	1877	1879	New York	
	William Earnshaw	1879	1880	Ohio	
	Louis Wagner	1880	1881	Pennsylvania	
	George Sargent Merrill	1881	1882	Massachusetts	
	Paul Vandervoort	1882	1883	Nebraska	First enlisted man to be elected Commander-in-Chief. National Woman's Relief Corps recognized as an official auxiliary to the G.A.R. during his term.
	Robert Burns Beath	1883	1884	Pennsylvania	
	John S. Kountz	1884	1885	Ohio	
	Samuel Swinfin Burdett	1885	1886	Washington, DC	
	Lucius Fairchild	1886	1887	Wisconsin	
	John Patterson Rea	1887	1888	Minnesota	
	William Warner	1888	1889	Missouri	
	Russell Alexander Alger	1889	1890	Michigan	
	Wheelock Graves Veazey	1890	1891	Vermont	Peak membership of the GAR: 409,489.
	John Palmer	1891	1892	New York	
	Augustus Gordon Weissert	1892	1893	Wisconsin	
	John Gregory Bishop Adams	1893	1894	Massachusetts	
	Thomas G. Lawler	1894	1895	Illinois	
	Ivan N. Walker	1895	1896	Indiana	
	Thaddeus Stevens Clarkson	1896	1897	Nebraska	
	John Peter Shindel Gobin	1897	1898	Pennsylvania	
	James Andrew Sexton	1898	1899	Illinois	Died in office, February 5, 1899.
	William Christie Johnson	1899	1899	Ohio	
	Albert Duane Shaw	1899	1900	New York	
	Leo Rassieur	1900	1901	Missouri	
	Eliakim "Ell" Torrance	1901	1902	Minnesota	
	Thomas Jameson Stewart	1902	1903	Pennsylvania	
	John Charles Black	1903	1904	Illinois	
	Wilmon Whilldin Blackmar	1904	1905	Massachusetts	Died in office, July 19, 1905.
	John Rigdon King	1905	1905	Maryland	
	James R. Tanner	1905	1906	New York	
	Robert Burns Brown	1906	1907	Ohio	
	Charles Germman Burton	1907	1908	Missouri	
	Henry Martin Nevius	1908	1909	New Jersey	
	Samuel Rinnah Van Sant	1909	1910	Minnesota	
	John Edward Gilman	1910	1911	Massachusetts	
	Harvey Marion Trimble	1911	1912	Illinois	
	Alfred Bishop Beers	1912	1913	Connecticut	
	Washington Gardner	1913	1914	Michigan	
	David James Palmer	1914	1915	Iowa	
	Elias Riggs Monfort	1915	1916	Ohio	
	William James Patterson	1916	1917	Pennsylvania	
	Orlando Allen Somers	1917	1918	Indiana	
	Clarendon E. Adams	1918	1919	Nebraska	
	James David Bell	1919	1920	New York	Died in office, November 1, 1919.
	Daniel Munson Hall	1920	1920	Ohio	
	William Alexander Ketcham	1920	1921	Indiana	
	Lewis Stephen Pilcher	1921	1922	New York	
	James William Willett	1922	1923	Iowa	
	Gaylord Miller Saltzgaber	1923	1924	Ohio	
	Louis Frederick Arensberg	1924	1925	Iowa	
	John Baptist Inman	1925	1926	Illinois	
	Francis Augustin "Frank" Walsh	1926	1927	Wisconsin	
	Elbridge Lafayette Hawk	1927	1928	California	
	John Reese	1928	1929	Nebraska	
	Edwin J. Foster	1929	1930	Massachusetts	
	James E. Jewel	1930	1931	Colorado	
	Samuel P. Town	1931	1932	Pennsylvania	
	William Parkinson Wright	1932	1933	Illinois	Died in office, June 15, 1933.
	Russell C. Martin	1933	1934	California	
	Alfred Edwin Stacey	1934	1935	New York	
	Oley Nelson	1935	1936	Iowa	
	Carl Henry William Ruhe	1936	1937	Pennsylvania	
	Overton H. Mennet	1937	1938	California	
	Robert McKee Rownd	1938	1939	New York	
	John E. Andrew	1940	1940	Illinois	Died in office, June 30, 1940.
	Alexander T. Anderson	1940	1940	Pennsylvania	
	William Washington Nixon	1940	1941	Kansas	
	George Alvin Gay	1941	1942	New Hampshire	
	John Simon Dumser	1942	1943	California	
	George H. Jones	1943	1944	Maine	
	Isaac W. Sharp	1944	1945	Indiana	
	Hiram R. Gale	1945	1946	Washington	
	John Henry Grate	1946	1947	Ohio	
	Robert McKee Rownd	1947	1948	New York	
nome	Theodore A. Penland	1948	1949	Oregon	Last Commander-in-Chief. Died in office, September 13, 1950.
