= North College Hill High School =

High school in Ohio

Location
- 1620 West Galbraith Road; North College Hill, (Hamilton County), Ohio 45239; United States; 39°13′7″N 84°33′2″W

Information
- Type: Public, Coeducational high school
- School district: North College Hill City Schools
- Superintendent: Eugene Blalock
- Principal: Maura Craig-Roach
- Teaching staff: 27.58 (FTE)
- Grades: 9-12
- Enrollment: 395 (2023-2024)
- Student to teacher ratio: 14.32
- Colors: Scarlet and Gold
- Athletics conference: Miami Valley Conference
- Team name: Trojans
- Accreditation: North Central Association of Colleges and Schools
- Website: https://www.nchcityschools.org/
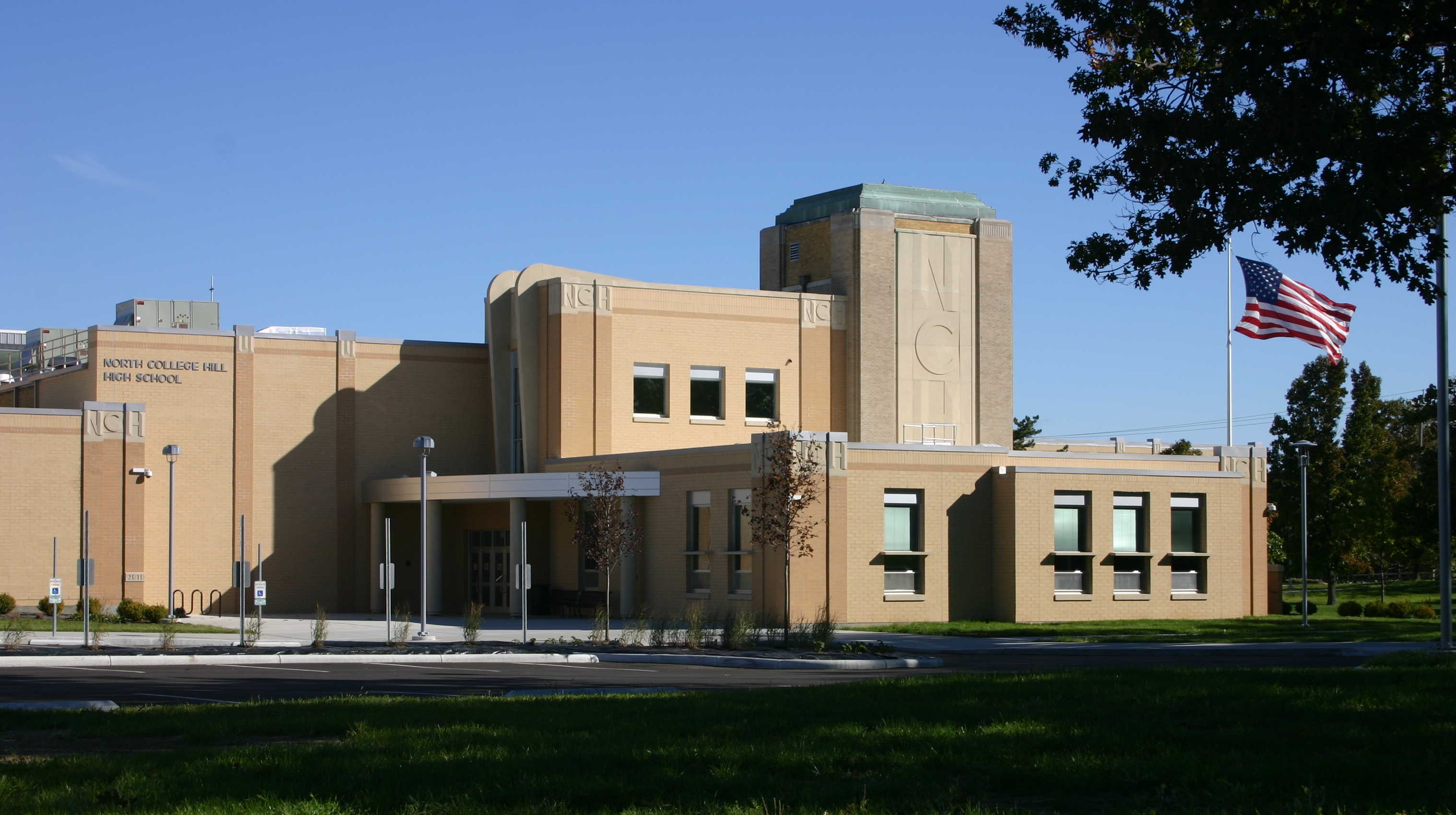

North College Hill High School is a public high school in North College Hill, Ohio. It is the only high school in the North College Hill City Schools district and has an enrollment of approximately 400 to 450 students.

== Innovative new buildings ==
In the November 2007 election, residents of North College Hill School District voted in favor of a bond issue for the construction of new school buildings.

In 2010, the District's buildings were consolidated within a single campus, with the physical education facilities separating the age groups. Three elementary Schools, Becker, Clovernook and Goodman, were replaced by North College Hill Elementary School, which houses all district students in preschool through grade four. A new middle school-high school building was also completed in 2010, with the high school preserving the clock tower from the former building that was dedicated in 1938. The former Goodman Elementary School building, erected in 1922, became the District Office, and the former Clovernook Elementary School building was repurposed as the North College Hill City Center.

In 2012, the middle school-high school building became the third education facility in Ohio to achieve a Platinum certification under the United States Green Building Council’s LEED for Schools certification system. North College Hill Elementary School achieved LEED Gold certification through the USGBC. The architectural firm which designed the new school buildings, SFA Architects, is a forerunner in LEED and sustainable building design.

Dr. Yejide Mack currently serves as the school's principal.

== Notable alumni ==
- Lou Groen (Class of 1935)—McDonald's restaurant owner; creator of the Filet-O-Fish sandwich
- Dwayne Crutchfield (Class of 1978)—college football player for Iowa State University and professional football player for the New York Jets, Houston Oilers, and Los Angeles Rams of the National Football League
- Bill Walker (Class of 2006)—college basketball player for Kansas State University; professional basketball player for the Boston Celtics and New York Knickerbockers of the National Basketball Association
- O. J. Mayo*—college basketball player for the University of Southern California; professional basketball player for the Memphis Grizzlies, Dallas Mavericks and Milwaukee Bucks of the National Basketball Association

*Transferred to Huntington High School (West Virginia) for Senior year.

== Athletics ==
North College Hill fields 12 varsity athletic teams, known as the Trojans, in nine sports. The school is a member of the Ohio High School Athletic Association and the Miami Valley Conference.

Teams and individuals from the school have earned the following state championships:

- Division III Boys Basketball—2005, 2006, 2007
- Division II Boys Track and field—2012: 100 Meter Dash, Lamar Hargrove
- Division II Boys Track and field—2012: 200 Meter Dash, Lamar Hargrove
- Division II Boys Track and field—2013: 100 Meter Dash, Lamar Hargrove
- Division II Girls Track and field—2014: 100 Meter Hurdles, Jazmin Smith
