= Monfort Heights, Ohio =

- Census-designated place
- Location in Hamilton County and the state of Ohio
- Coordinates: 39°11′07″N 84°37′20″W
- Country: United States
- State: Ohio
- County: Hamilton

Area
  - Total: 5.93 sq mi (15.37 km^{2})
  - Land: 5.93 sq mi (15.36 km^{2})
  - Water: 0 sq mi (0.00 km^{2})
- Elevation: 925 ft (282 m)

Population (2020)
  - Total: 12,070
  - Density: 2,035/sq mi (785.6/km^{2})
- Time zone: UTC-5 (Eastern (EST))
  - Summer (DST): UTC-4 (EDT)
- FIPS code: 39-51212
- GNIS feature ID: 2585515

Monfort Heights is a census-designated place (CDP) in Green Township, Hamilton County, Ohio, United States, part of the Cincinnati–Northern Kentucky metropolitan area. The population of Monfort Heights was 12,070 at the 2020 census. In previous censuses, the area was listed as two separate CDPs, Monfort Heights East and Monfort Heights South.

== History ==
The community was earlier known as "Wisenburg" or "Wisenburgh" A post office named "Monfort" was established on March 17, 1900, with Frank Lumler as its first postmaster. The office was named in honor of Civil War Captain Elias Riggs Monfort, who was then the postmaster of Cincinnati. The office was discontinued on September 14, 1905. The name almost disappeared until the late 1920s when a name was needed for a new school district after the consolidation of three area districts and the name "Monfort Heights" was selected.

A 1944 study cited a population of 250 for Monfort Heights in 1920.

The first Cincinnati area McDonald's was opened by Lou Groen in Monfort Heights in 1959. It was at this restaurant that he created the iconic Filet-O-Fish sandwich to lure his Catholic customers during Lent and on Fridays.

== Geography ==
Monfort Heights is located 9 miles (14 km) northwest of downtown Cincinnati. The community "runs along North Bend Road with its heart at the intersection of West Fork and North Bend Roads." Just south of this intersection is Exit 14 of Interstate 74 which runs east–west through the CDP.

According to the United States Census Bureau, the CDP has a total area of 5.9 square miles (15.3 km^{2}), all land.

== Demographics ==
=== 2020 census ===
As of the 2020 census, Monfort Heights had a population of 12,070. The population density was 2,034.73 people per square mile (785.60/km^{2}). The median age was 44.1 years. 19.6% of residents were under the age of 18 and 22.0% of residents were 65 years of age or older. For every 100 females there were 92.1 males, and for every 100 females age 18 and over there were 91.2 males age 18 and over.

100.0% of residents lived in urban areas, while 0.0% lived in rural areas.

There were 4,986 households in Monfort Heights, of which 25.0% had children under the age of 18 living in them. Of all households, 50.5% were married-couple households, 17.6% were households with a male householder and no spouse or partner present, and 26.3% were households with a female householder and no spouse or partner present. About 30.2% of all households were made up of individuals and 15.0% had someone living alone who was 65 years of age or older. The average household size was 2.61, and the average family size was 3.16.

There were 5,222 housing units, of which 4.5% were vacant. The homeowner vacancy rate was 0.7% and the rental vacancy rate was 9.8%.

Racial composition as of the 2020 census
Race	Number	Percent
White	9,865	81.7%
Black or African American	1,288	10.7%
American Indian and Alaska Native	11	0.1%
Asian	276	2.3%
Native Hawaiian and Other Pacific Islander	9	0.1%
Some other race	83	0.7%
Two or more races	538	4.5%
Hispanic or Latino (of any race)	201	1.7%

=== Income and poverty ===
According to the U.S. Census American Community Survey, for the period 2016-2020 the estimated median annual income for a household in the CDP was $82,835, and the median income for a family was $98,276. About 2.3% of the population were living below the poverty line, including 0.0% of those under age 18 and 6.3% of those age 65 or over. About 69.4% of the population were employed, and 45.4% had a bachelor's degree or higher.

== Notable person ==
- Bonnie Lou, music and TV star
