= Fish finger sandwich =

Sandwich primarily containing fish fingers

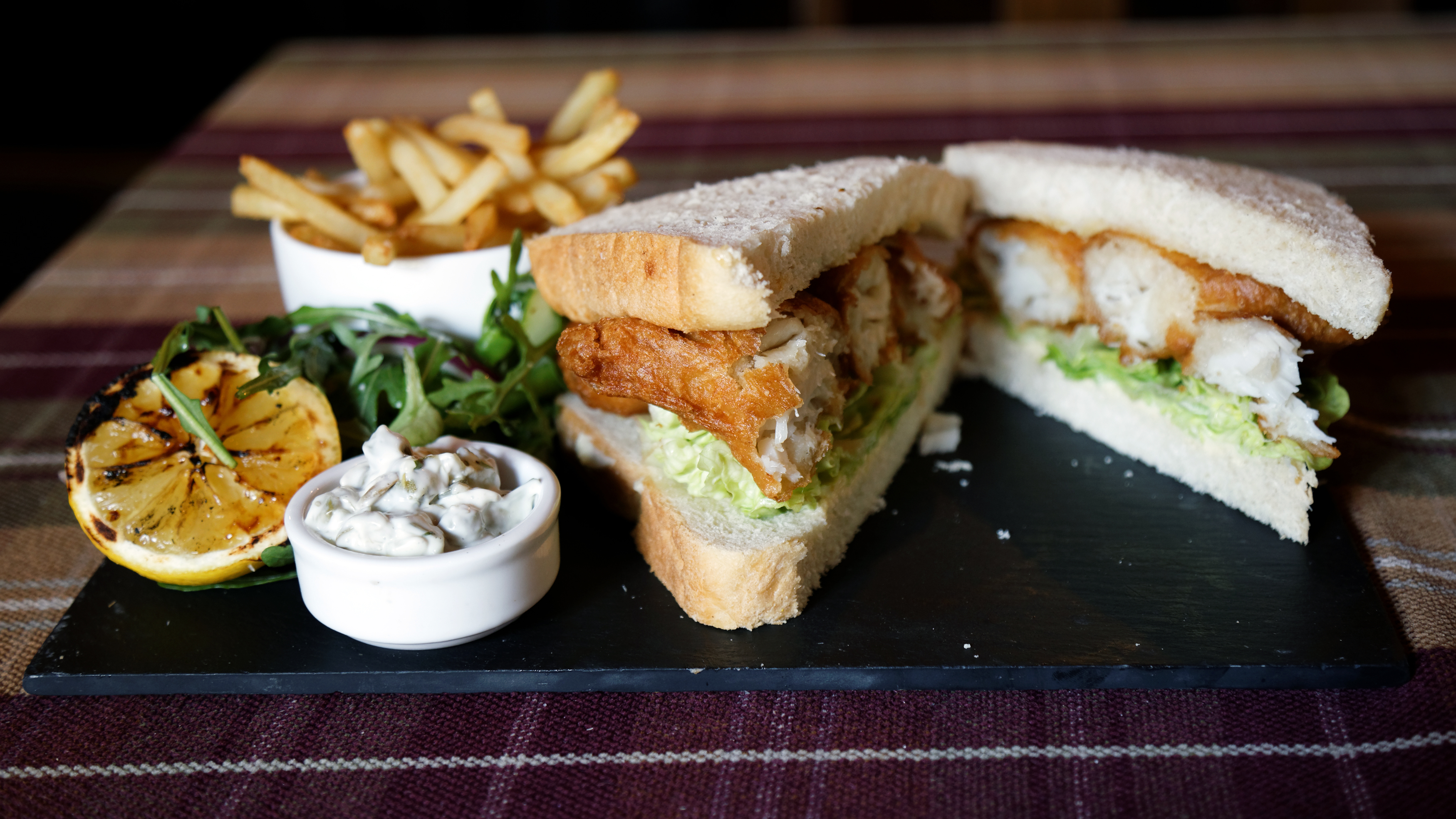
- Type: Sandwich
- Place of origin: United Kingdom
- Main ingredients: Bread, butter/similar sauces, fish fingers

A fish finger sandwich is a sandwich primarily containing fish fingers, which are pieces of battered or breaded fish, along with lettuce and a sauce. It is a popular dish in the United Kingdom, where it is a comfort food. The sandwich often has no other filling, but may include a sauce such as tartar, mayonnaise or ketchup.

Celebrity chef Jamie Oliver has described the sandwich as a guilty pleasure: "As a chef I always feel I shouldn't be eating something like a fish finger buttie – but you know what, I think that makes it taste even better."

Restaurants which have included fish finger sandwiches in their menu include: Bill's, Kerbisher & Malt and Leon.

In 2017, Birds Eye sponsored Fish Finger Sandwich Awards, whose final stage was held at Mark Hix's Tramshed restaurant. There were separate prizes for the best professional and best entry from the public. The judges were Gregg Wallace, Jennifer Bedloe, Xanthe Clay, Peter Lack and Danny Kingston, while Captain Birdseye looked on. The winning professional was Chris Lanyon of the Chapel Café in Port Isaac whose recipe included hake in panko with tartar sauce. Gabrielle Sander made the best public entry, which was dressed with capers, lime juice, smoked paprika mayonnaise, rocket and wasabi, served in a crusty bap.

== See also ==
- Filet-O-Fish sandwich, invented in 1962 in the US
