= O. J. Mayo =

American basketball player (born 1987)

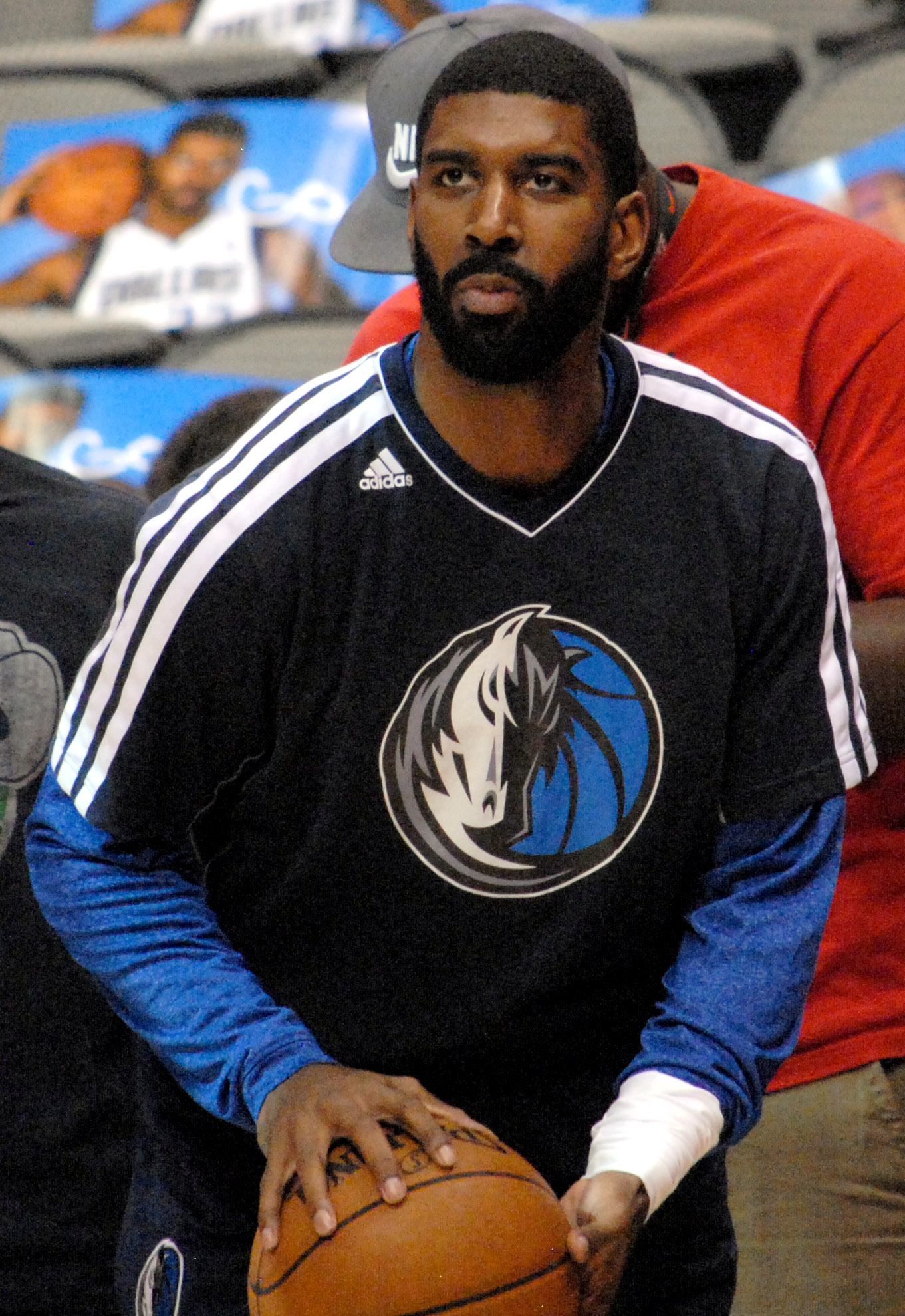
- Mayo with the Dallas Mavericks in 2013

Liaoning Flying Leopards
- Title: Assistant coach
- League: Chinese Basketball Association

Personal information
- Born: November 5, 1987 (age 39) Huntington, West Virginia, U.S.
- Listed height: 6 ft 5 in (1.96 m)
- Listed weight: 210 lb (95 kg)

Career information
- High school: Rose Hill Christian (Ashland, Kentucky); North College Hill (North College Hill, Ohio); Huntington (Huntington, West Virginia)
- College: USC (2007–2008)
- NBA draft: 2008: 1st round, 3rd overall pick
- Drafted by: Minnesota Timberwolves
- Playing career: 2008–2023
- Position: shooting guard
- Number: 32, 00, 3

Career history

Playing
- 2008–2012: Memphis Grizzlies
- 2012–2013: Dallas Mavericks
- 2013–2016: Milwaukee Bucks
- 2018: Atléticos de San Germán
- 2018–2019: Dacin Tigers
- 2019: Hunan Jinjian Rice Industry
- 2019–2020: Taipei Fubon Braves
- 2020–2021: Liaoning Flying Leopards
- 2021–2022: UNICS
- 2022–2023: Zamalek

Coaching
- 2024–present: Liaoning Flying Leopards (assistant coach)

Career highlights
- SBL All-Star (2019); SBL Three Point Contest champion (2019); SBL scoring champion (2019); NBA All-Rookie First Team (2009); First-team All-Pac-10 (2008); Pac-10 All-Freshman team (2008); Mr. Basketball USA (2007); McDonald's All-American (2007); 2× First-team Parade All-American (2006, 2007); Second-team Parade All-American (2005); Bill Evans Award (2007); 2× Ohio Mr. Basketball (2005, 2006)
- Stats at NBA.com
- Stats at Basketball Reference

Ovinton J'Anthony "O.J." Mayo (born November 5, 1987) is an American former professional basketball player who played for eight seasons in the National Basketball Association (NBA), most notably with the Memphis Grizzlies and Milwaukee Bucks. He currently works as an assistant coach for Liaoning Flying Leopards of the Chinese Basketball Association (CBA). Mayo played a single season of college basketball for the USC Trojans while earning first-team All-Pac-10 honors.

However, he was retroactively declared ineligible when it was discovered that he had received improper benefits in violation of NCAA rules before he even played a game, and the Trojans vacated all of their 21 wins from the 2007–08 season. Mayo entered the 2008 NBA draft and was selected by the Minnesota Timberwolves with the third overall pick. He was later traded to the Memphis Grizzlies, with whom he played four seasons. Mayo signed with the Dallas Mavericks in 2012, and then with the Milwaukee Bucks in 2013. In July 2016, Mayo was banned from the NBA for violating the league's anti-drug program. After a two-year hiatus, he resumed his career with Atléticos de San Germán of the Baloncesto Superior Nacional (BSN) in Puerto Rico.

== High school career ==
Mayo began playing high school basketball at Rose Hill Christian High School in Ashland, Kentucky. In Kentucky, grade schoolers can play high school basketball, and Mayo averaged 23.1 points for Rose Hill's varsity team while in 7th grade. In 8th grade, he was just turning 15 and tallied 27 points per game and was named a first-team all-state player by the Louisville Courier-Journal. Mayo then moved to suburban Cincinnati to live with club team coach Dwaine Barnes. (Mayo referred to him as his "grandfather" but the two aren't related.) Mayo enrolled at North College Hill High School in North College Hill, Ohio in April 2003. The Cincinnati Enquirer and local television stations sent reporters to cover Mayo's first day of school at NCH.

Mayo was selected as Mr. Basketball of Ohio for the second consecutive season, in addition to being named Associated Press Division III Player of the Year for the second consecutive season. He averaged nearly 29 points, nine rebounds, and six assists per game. He also led his team to three consecutive AP poll titles and was featured in the pages of Sports Illustrated among other publications.

In February 2006, Mayo attracted the largest crowd to ever see a high school game in Cincinnati, Ohio when 16,202 fans watched North College Hill fall to the nation's number one rated team, Oak Hill Academy. Mayo had been considered a lock to make the leap straight from high school to the NBA, but the Collective Bargaining Agreement between the NBA and its players instituted a rule that a player must be at least a year out of high school before he can enter the NBA, effectively curtailing those plans. On July 5, 2006, it was reported by ESPN that he would attend USC.

Mayo enrolled at Huntington High School in Huntington, West Virginia for the 2006–07 school year. He formally committed to USC in November 2006.

In January 2007, Mayo allegedly assaulted referee Mike Lazo after being ejected from a Huntington High game vs. Capital High School at the Charleston Civic Center. In accordance with West Virginia Secondary School Activities Commission rules, Mayo was suspended for two games. However, due to allegations that Lazo had overreacted and faked the incident, a temporary restraining order was signed by Cabell County Circuit Court Judge Dan O'Hanlan, temporarily lifting the suspensions on Mayo and five other players suspended due to incidents at that game. However, shortly after, the restraining order was nullified, and Mayo was suspended for three games, a punishment that Mayo described as "fair".

=== Awards and honors ===
Mayo was selected by the West Virginia Sports Writers Association as the 2007 recipient of the Bill Evans Award for the state's boys basketball player of the year. Mayo led the state in scoring for the 2006–2007 season at 28.4 points per game. Runner-up in the voting was teammate Patrick Patterson.

On March 17, 2007, Mayo led Huntington High School to its third consecutive Class AAA basketball championship in the state of West Virginia with 103–61 rout of South Charleston. Mayo finished with a triple-double: 41 points, 10 rebounds, and 11 assists.

He graduated in May 2007 and signed a letter of intent to enroll at USC. He scored a 29 on the ACT, placing him in the 95th percentile nationally.

== College career ==
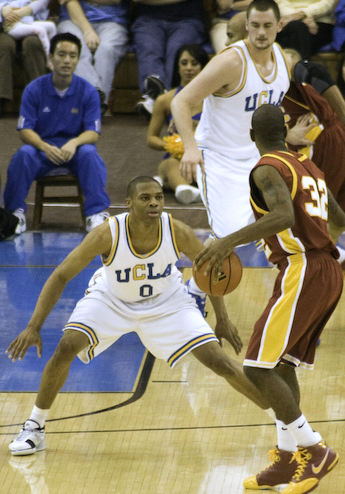
O. J. Mayo playing for USC in a game against UCLA's Russell Westbrook and Kevin Love

Mayo had given Kansas State a soft verbal commitment to play for them, but retracted it when head coach Bob Huggins announced he would take the same position at West Virginia. Frank Martin, by whom Mayo was recruited, was named head coach. Former teammate at North College Hill High School Bill Walker opted to stay and play for Martin.

Mayo enrolled at the University of Southern California (USC) in the summer of 2007, taking two classes. While waiting for the season to begin, he played pickup basketball at the UCLA men's gym against NBA players such as Kobe Bryant, Sam Cassell, Kevin Garnett, Mike Dunleavy Jr., D. J. Augustin, Jason Kidd, Adam Morrison, and J. J. Redick.

Mayo earned All-Pac-10 first team honors for the 2007–08 season. In the 2008 Pacific-10 Conference men's basketball tournament, the Trojans lost to UCLA, featuring Kevin Love and Russell Westbrook, in the semi-finals. Both Mayo and Love were selected to the All-Pac-10 tournament team. In his NCAA Tournament debut with the Trojans, Mayo scored 20 points as USC was beaten by Kansas State.

Mayo did not return for his sophomore season, opting to instead enter the 2008 NBA draft.

=== Improper benefits and rules violation ===
On May 11, 2008, ESPN reported that a former "confidant", Louis Johnson, revealed on ESPN's TV show Outside the Lines that Mayo received numerous gifts in violation of NCAA rules. The report stated that Mayo received the gifts from Rodney Guillory before and during his tenure at USC. Guillory is said to have received the money from the Bill Duffy Associates Sports Management (BDA).

In April 2009, the NCAA combined its investigations of Mayo and former running back Reggie Bush into a single probe of the Trojans' athletic program.

On January 3, 2010, USC announced that it had determined Mayo was ineligible for the 2007–2008 season because he had received improper benefits, and had thus forfeited his amateur status before ever playing a game for USC. As a result, USC vacated all 21 of its wins from the 2007–08 season, dropping its record to 0–12. A vacated game does not count as a win for the other team, but is officially treated as having never happened. USC also withdrew from postseason consideration (including the Pac-10 conference tournament) for the 2009–10 season.

== Professional career ==
=== Memphis Grizzlies (2008–2012) ===
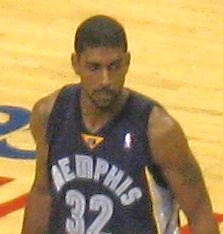
Mayo during his rookie season in 2008.

On June 26, 2008, Mayo was selected 3rd overall in the 2008 NBA draft by the Timberwolves. Later that day, he was traded, along with Marko Jarić, Antoine Walker, and Greg Buckner, to the Memphis Grizzlies in exchange for Kevin Love, Mike Miller, Brian Cardinal, and Jason Collins. Mayo was a part of the Select Team that helped get the U.S. national team ready for the 2008 Summer Olympics in Beijing. Mayo was the runner-up for the 2008–09 NBA Rookie of the Year Award, finishing second behind Chicago Bulls point guard Derrick Rose.

On November 1, 2009, Mayo scored a career-high 40 points against the Denver Nuggets on 17 of 25 shooting.

Mayo was late for a game-day shootaround and was taken out of the starting lineup starting November 20, 2010. On a return flight to Memphis from Los Angeles, Mayo was involved in a fight with teammate Tony Allen over a debt from an in-flight card game. On January 27, the NBA suspended Mayo for 10 games following a positive test for the steroid dehydroepiandrosterone (DHEA), which violates the league's anti-drug program. Mayo blamed an over the counter supplement that he didn't know was banned by the NBA for the positive test, but he declined to say which supplement he used. He later said an unnamed energy drink he bought at a gas station contained the banned substance.

Despite playing in all 66 games of the shortened 2011–12 season, Mayo did not start in any games for the Grizzlies, playing as a sixth man. When he was asked if being a reserve hurt his value, he answered, "I would say so, I would probably say so. What do you think?"

=== Dallas Mavericks (2012–2013) ===
The Grizzlies did not sign a qualifying offer sheet for Mayo, making him an unrestricted free agent. On July 19, Mayo officially signed with the Mavericks.

On December 8, Mayo tied his career-high of 40 points in a game against the Houston Rockets. Two days later, he tied a career high of playing 52 minutes in a double-overtime loss to the Boston Celtics. On December 28, 2012, Mayo had a career high of 5 steals against the Denver Nuggets. On March 6, Mayo recorded a new career high of 12 assists against the Houston Rockets. After Nowitzki, the Mavericks' all-time leading scorer, returned, Mayo saw his scoring average dip. Mayo said, "I'm a scorer and can shoot the ball a little bit, but I like to be a playmaker. I like to try to take what the defense gives you and not just concentrate on scoring the ball. Find other guys."

Mayo finished the season with averages of 15.3 points, 4.4 assists and 3.5 rebounds while playing a team-high 35.5 minutes per game. His production dropped considerably after the All-Star break, when star player Nowitzki re-emerged after missing the first 27 games. On April 18, 2013, he announced he would decline the player option on his contract for the following season and become a free agent.

=== Milwaukee Bucks (2013–2016) ===
On July 13, 2013, Mayo signed a three-year, $24 million contract with the Milwaukee Bucks. The signing was essentially a trade of starting shooting guards, as Monta Ellis departed Milwaukee to sign with Dallas.

On October 30, 2013, in his Bucks debut, Mayo recorded 13 points and 5 rebounds in a loss to the New York Knicks. Mayo later missed time during the 2013–14 season due to issues with his conditioning as he appeared in a career-low 52 games.

Mayo bounced back for the Bucks in 2014–15, recording seven 20-plus point games on the season. In Game 4 of the Bucks' first round playoff match-up against the Chicago Bulls, Mayo scored 18 points and hit a clutch three-pointer with 1:42 left in the game to give the Bucks a six-point lead.

On November 19, 2015, Mayo made his season debut for the Bucks after missing the first 11 games of the season due to a strained right hamstring he suffered in the final preseason game. On December 5, he had a season-best game after coach Jason Kidd started him at point guard, largely due to the Bucks being down on point guards due to injury. In 35 minutes of action, he recorded 17 points and 5 assists in a 106–91 win over the New York Knicks. On February 9, 2016, he returned to action against the Boston Celtics after missing 11 games with a left hamstring injury. On March 10, he was ruled out for the rest of the season after he suffered a fractured right ankle.

On July 1, 2016, Mayo was dismissed from the NBA for a drug violation. He was eligible for reinstatement around the start of the 2018–19 NBA season.

=== Atléticos de San Germán (2018) ===
On April 4, 2018, Mayo was reported to sign with Atléticos de San Germán of the Baloncesto Superior Nacional. On June 27, he was released.

Mayo started 18 of his 21 appearances with the team, shooting just 39.0 percent from the field and 34.7 percent from beyond the arc. He averaged 13.4 points, 3.9 rebounds, 3.5 assists and 1.1 steals.

=== Dacin Tigers (2018–2019) ===
On October 22, 2018, Mayo was reported to sign with Dacin Tigers of the Super Basketball League in Taiwan. Mayo finished the 2018–19 SBL season with averages of 22.7 points, 7.3 rebounds, 4.3 assists and 1.6 steals in 36 total games played (33 in the regular season and 3 in the playoffs), averaging 28.2 minutes per game and shooting 47.7% from the field (36.2% from the 3-point line).

=== Hunan Jinjian Rice Industry (2019) ===
Soon after the Taiwan's SBL season ended, Mayo signed with Hunan Jinjian Rice Industry of National Basketball League (NBL), the second-tier league in China.

=== Taipei Fubon Braves (2019–2020) ===
On October 17, 2019, the Taipei Fubon Braves officially announced that they signed Mayo for the upcoming ASEAN Basketball League (ABL) season.

=== Liaoning Flying Leopards (2020–2021) ===
Mayo signed with the Liaoning Flying Leopards of the Chinese Basketball Association (CBA) and made his debut in the 2019–20 CBA season on June 23, 2020, scoring 28 points in a 102–106 loss to the Guangzhou Loong Lions.

On July 17, 2020, Mayo scored 44 points in a win against Ty Lawson's Fujian Sturgeons, while shooting 8–10 from the three-point line. On July 26, Mayo won the CBA Player of the Month award for the month of July. Over 15 regular season games, Mayo averaged 28.4 points, 7.1 rebounds, 4.3 assists and 2.5 steals per game, shooting 57% from the field (43.5% from three) in 35.9 minutes of average playing time.

On November 13, 2020, Mayo set a new career-high of 48 points in a win against the Qingdao Eagles. He also had 8 rebounds and 6 assists.

=== UNICS (2021–2022) ===
On September 20, 2021, Mayo signed a one-year contract with the Russian team UNICS Kazan of the VTB United League. On February 7, 2022, Mayo scored a buzzer-beating game-winner against arch-rivals CSKA Moscow to give UNICS the win after triple overtime. He averaged 7.2 points on 35.4% shooting in nine games.

=== Zamalek (2022–2023) ===
In December 2022, Mayo joined the Egyptian club Zamalek of the Egyptian Basketball Super League.

== National team career ==
Mayo was a part of the Select Team that helped get the U.S. national team ready for the 2008 Summer Olympics in Beijing.

== Career statistics ==
Legend
GP	Games played	GS	Games started	MPG	Minutes per game
FG%	Field goal percentage	3P%	3-point field goal percentage	FT%	Free throw percentage
RPG	Rebounds per game	APG	Assists per game	SPG	Steals per game
BPG	Blocks per game	PPG	Points per game	**Bold**	Career high
*	Led the league

=== NBA ===
==== Regular season ====
Year	Team	GP	GS	MPG	FG%	3P%	FT%	RPG	APG	SPG	BPG	PPG
2008–09	Memphis	**82***	**82***	**38.0**	.438	.384	**.879**	**3.8**	3.2	1.1	.2	**18.5**
2009–10	Memphis	**82***	**82***	**38.0**	**.458**	.383	.809	**3.8**	3.0	**1.2**	.2	17.5
2010–11	Memphis	71	17	26.3	.407	.364	.756	2.4	2.0	1.0	**.4**	11.3
2011–12	Memphis	66*	0	26.8	.408	.364	.773	3.2	2.6	1.1	.3	12.6
2012–13	Dallas	**82***	**82***	35.5	.449	**.407**	.820	3.5	**4.4**	1.1	.3	15.3
2013–14	Milwaukee	52	23	25.9	.407	.370	.864	2.4	2.2	.5	.3	11.7
2014–15	Milwaukee	71	15	23.9	.422	.357	.827	2.6	2.8	.8	.3	11.4
2015–16	Milwaukee	41	24	26.6	.371	.321	.775	2.6	2.9	**1.2**	.2	7.8
Career		547	325	30.9	.429	.373	.820	3.1	2.9	1.0	.3	13.8

==== Playoffs ====
Year	Team	GP	GS	MPG	FG%	3P%	FT%	RPG	APG	SPG	BPG	PPG
2011	Memphis	**13**	**2**	**27.8**	**.388**	**.408**	.793	3.2	2.4	.8	**.3**	**11.3**
2012	Memphis	7	0	23.3	.274	.292	.778	**3.6**	2.1	**1.3**	.1	8.9
2015	Milwaukee	6	0	26.0	.333	.316	**1.000**	3.3	**3.0**	1.2	.2	9.0
Career		26	2	26.2	.348	.359	.824	3.3	2.5	1.0	.2	10.1

=== EuroLeague ===
Year	Team	GP	GS	MPG	FG%	3P%	FT%	RPG	APG	SPG	BPG	PPG	PIR
2021–22	UNICS	20	0	13.1	.453	.451	.778	1.2	1.1	0.6	.0	5.8	2.6
Career		20	0	13.1	.453	.451	.778	1.2	1.1	.6	.0	5.8	2.6

=== College ===
Year	Team	GP	GS	MPG	FG%	3P%	FT%	RPG	APG	SPG	BPG	PPG
2007–08	USC	33	32	36.8	.442	.409	.803	4.5	3.3	1.5	0.4	20.7

=== Others ===
Year	Team	GP	GS	MPG	FG%	3P%	FT%	RPG	APG	SPG	BPG	PPG
2018–2019	SBL-Dacin	33	33	28	.433	.368	.814	7.3	4.3	1.6	0.2	22.6

== Personal life ==
Mayo's brother, Todd, played basketball for the Marquette Golden Eagles. He was selected by the Westchester Knicks in the 2014 NBA Development League Draft and played for them until being waived on January 28, 2015.

=== Legal issues ===
On March 9, 2007, Mayo and three other men were cited by the Cabell County Sheriff's Department for misdemeanor simple possession of marijuana. Officers found the cannabis in a car in which Mayo was a passenger and, since no one claimed possession, all occupants were ticketed. Charges against Mayo were dropped on March 12, 2007, after one of the other passengers in the vehicle took responsibility for the marijuana.

== See also ==
- 2006 high school boys basketball All-Americans
- List of people banned or suspended by the NBA
