= Monfort Heights East, Ohio =

- Former CDP
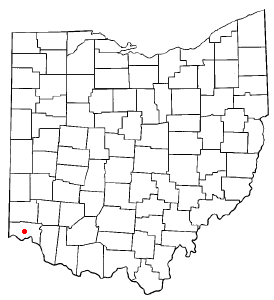
- Location of Monfort Heights East, Ohio
- Coordinates: 39°11′19″N 84°34′59″W
- Country: United States
- State: Ohio
- County: Hamilton

Area
  - Total: 1.4 sq mi (3.7 km^{2})
  - Land: 1.4 sq mi (3.7 km^{2})
  - Water: 0 sq mi (0.0 km^{2})

Population (2000)
  - Total: 3,880
  - Density: 2,700/sq mi (1,041/km^{2})
- Time zone: UTC-5 (Eastern (EST))
  - Summer (DST): UTC-4 (EDT)
- FIPS code: 39-51215

Monfort Heights East was a census-designated place (CDP) in Green Township, Hamilton County, Ohio, United States. The population was 3,880 at the 2000 census. For the 2010 census the area was merged into the new Monfort Heights CDP.

== Geography ==
Monfort Heights East was located at 39°11′19″N 84°34′59″W (39.188679, -84.582945).

According to the United States Census Bureau, the CDP had a total area of 1.4 square miles (3.6 km^{2}), all of it land.

== Demographics ==
As of the census of 2000, there were 3,880 people, 1,552 households, and 1,044 families residing in the CDP. The population density was 2,696.2 inhabitants per square mile (1,041.0/km^{2}). There were 1,596 housing units at an average density of 1,109.1 per square mile (428.2/km^{2}). The racial makeup of the CDP was 90.70% White, 6.44% African American, 0.21% Native American, 1.52% Asian, 0.26% from other races, and 0.88% from two or more races. Hispanic or Latino of any race were 0.54% of the population.

There were 1,552 households, out of which 35.6% had children under the age of 18 living with them, 53.4% were married couples living together, 10.6% had a female householder with no husband present, and 32.7% were non-families. 26.5% of all households were made up of individuals, and 9.6% had someone living alone who was 65 years of age or older. The average household size was 2.50 and the average family size was 3.08.

In the CDP, the population was spread out, with 28.0% under the age of 18, 7.9% from 18 to 24, 32.8% from 25 to 44, 18.8% from 45 to 64, and 12.4% who were 65 years of age or older. The median age was 34 years. For every 100 females, there were 95.0 males. For every 100 females age 18 and over, there were 90.6 males.

The median income for a household in the CDP was $49,028, and the median income for a family was $62,382. Males had a median income of $41,008 versus $30,897 for females. The per capita income for the CDP was $21,881. About 6.3% of families and 7.5% of the population were below the poverty line, including 12.3% of those under age 18 and 3.8% of those age 65 or over.
