= Rose Hill Christian High School =

Private high school in Kentucky, United States

Coordinates: 38°27′21.7″N 82°40′39.8″W

Rose Hill Christian High School is a private, non-profit Christian school operated by the Rose Hill Missionary Baptist Church in Ashland, Kentucky, United States. Organized in 1980, the school draws students from several Kentucky counties, as well as Ohio and West Virginia.

== Philosophy ==
The school's philosophy is based upon its interpretation of Corinthians 2:2,3 and Luke 2:52: "We provide a Christian environment which encourages each student to develop those graces and skills demonstrated in the life of Christ; to discover and exercise his/her own unique, God-given abilities and gifts through expanding opportunities; and to achieve educational excellence in all disciplines, with a strong emphasis on patriotism, respect, and character building."

== Discipline and position on homosexuality ==
Describing homosexuality as a "sexual perversion," the school notes in its student handbook that "...gambling, profanity, obscenity, the use of alcohol or any substance abuse, pre-marital sex, homosexuality or other sexual perversions, the indiscriminate taking of an innocent life (born or unborn), and other such practices" are considered unacceptable conduct and may be grounds for expulsion (emphasis added).

== Athletics ==
USC's O. J. Mayo and Kansas State's Bill Walker both played for Rose Hill when they were eighth graders. The Royals joined the KHSAA IN 1991.
