= Fish finger =

Breaded processed fish

Fish fingers
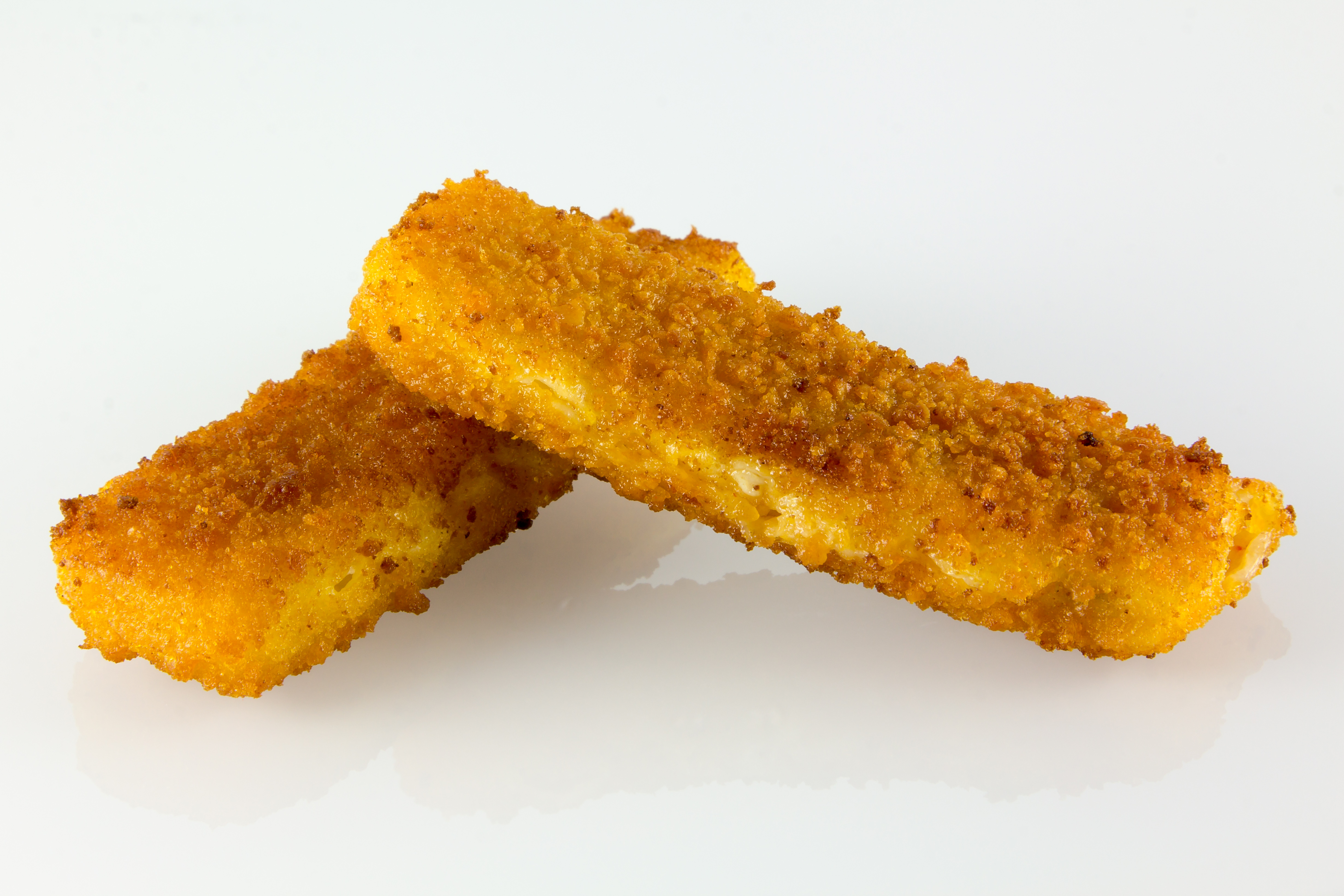
- Fried fish fingers
- Alternative names: Fish sticks
- Place of origin: United Kingdom
- Main ingredients: Whitefish, battered, or breaded

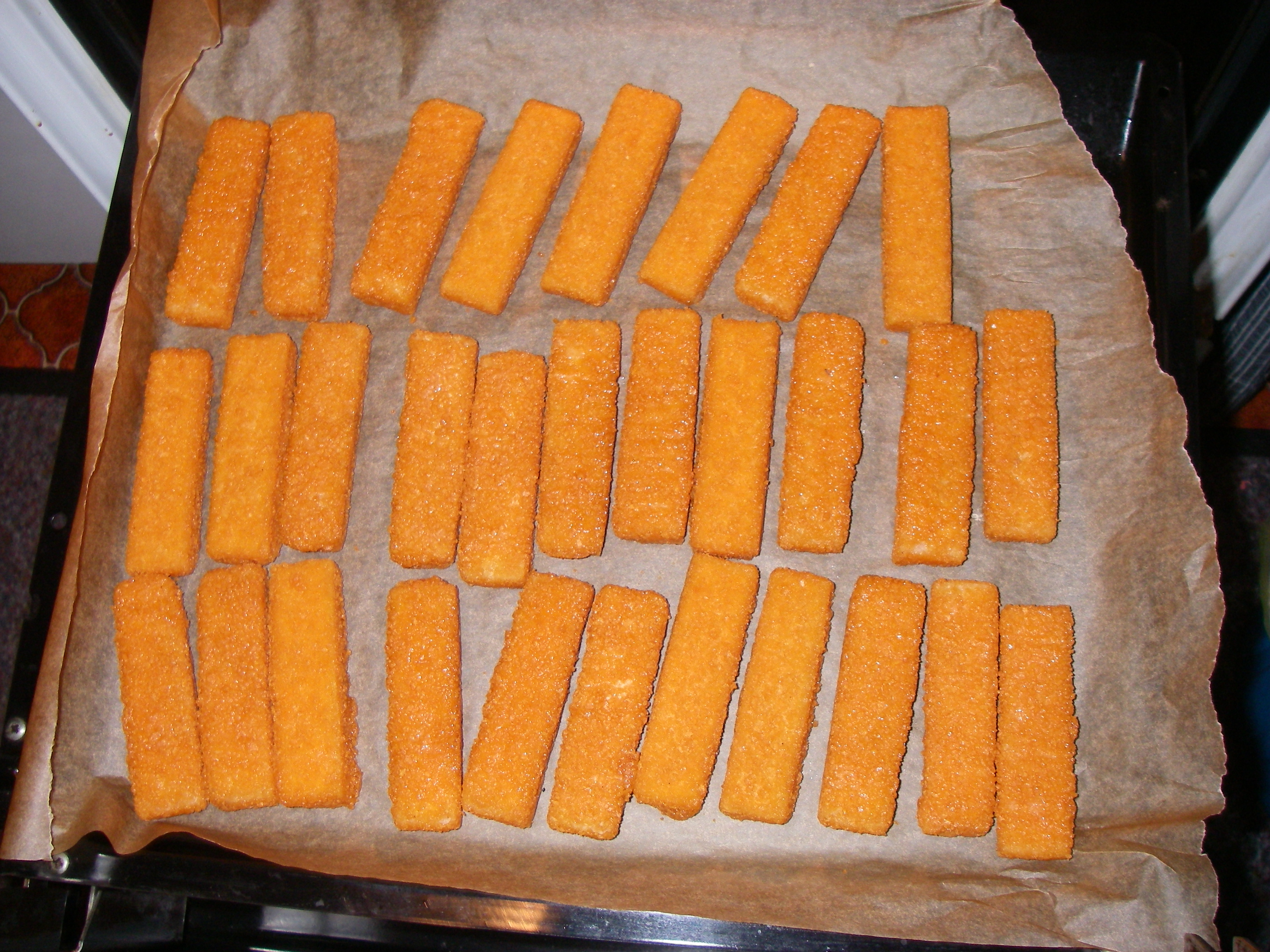
Baked fish fingers on baking paper

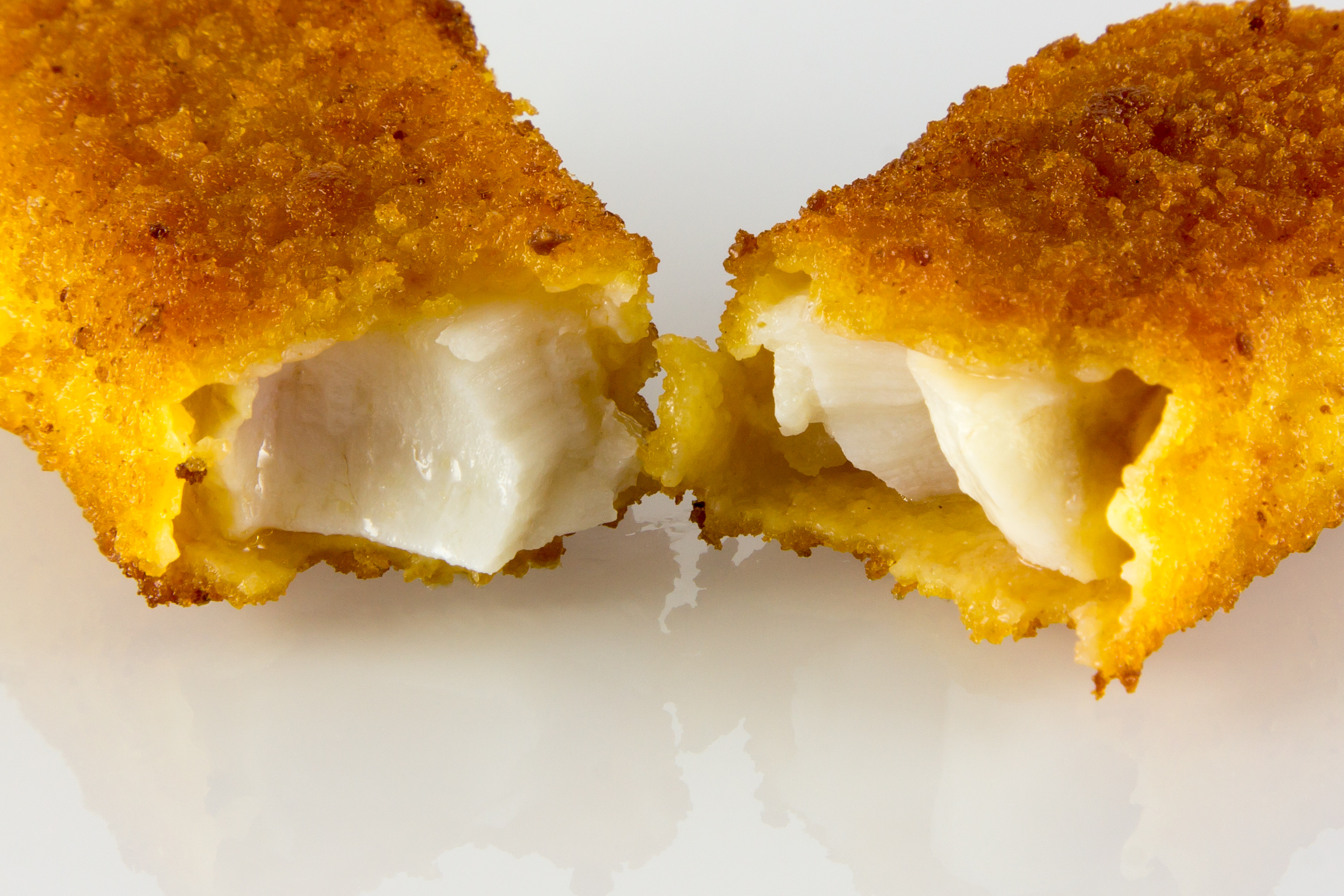
Filling inside a fish finger

Fish fingers (British English) or fish sticks (American English and Canadian English) are a processed food made using a whitefish, such as cod, hake, haddock, or pollock, which has been battered or breaded and formed into a rectangular shape. They are commonly available in the frozen food section of supermarkets. They can be baked in an oven, cooked in the microwave, grilled, shallow fried, or deep-fried.

== History ==
The term "fish finger" is first referenced in a recipe given in a popular British magazine in 1900, and the dish is often considered symbolic of the United Kingdom by British people.

The food restrictions during and after WWII expanded the consumption of fish fingers, but companies struggled to maintain decent quality. The commercialization of fish fingers may be traced to 1953 when the American company General Foods released them under the Birds Eye label. The developer of those fish sticks was Aaron L. Brody.

"In 1929, Clarence Birdseye...sold his company and name...It was the grey-suited marketing men of Unilever who brought the fish stick concept to Britain." - Shelagh Wilson, University of Northumbria, Newcastle

There was an abundance of herring in the United Kingdom after World War II. Clarence Birdseye test-marketed herring fish fingers, a product he had discovered in the United States, under the name "herring savouries". These were tested in Southampton and South Wales against "cod fingers", a comparatively bland product used as a control. Shoppers, however, confounded expectations by showing an overwhelming preference for the cod. The snack was nearly called Battered Cod Pieces, until a poll of Birds Eye workers opted for the snappier Fish Fingers.

== Varieties ==
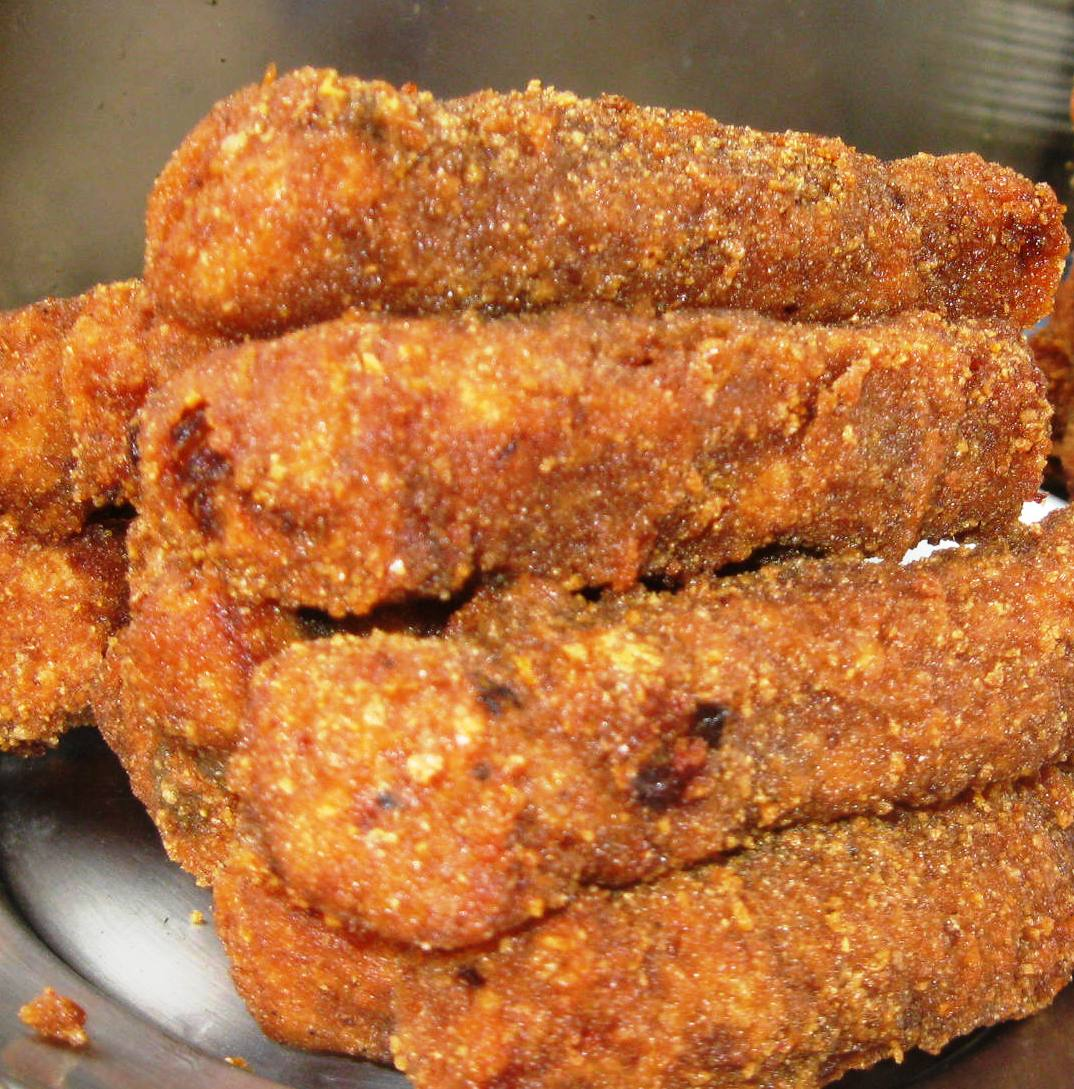
Fried fish fingers, Kolkata, India

Minced fish comes in industry standard 7.5 kg (17 lb) frozen blocks for further slicing and battering. These are more commonly used in store brand economy products. They may have either batter or breadcrumbs around the outside as casing, although the coating is normally breadcrumbs.

During the late 1980s and early 1990s, the Sweden frozen food brand Findus released a fish finger product with a coating of chips in place of breadcrumbs under the name "Crostinos".

== See also ==
- Crab stick
- Chicken fingers
- Chicken nugget
- Fishcake
- Fish finger sandwich

== Bibliography ==
- "How in the World? A Fascinating Journey Through the World of Human Ingenuity", Reader's Digest, 1990, ISBN 978-0-89577-353-1
