= Monfort Heights South, Ohio =

- Former CDP
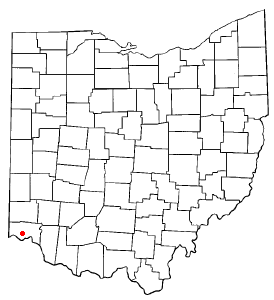
- Location of Monfort Heights South, Ohio
- Coordinates: 39°10′18″N 84°36′23″W
- Country: United States
- State: Ohio
- County: Hamilton

Area
  - Total: 3.1 sq mi (8.0 km^{2})
  - Land: 3.1 sq mi (8.0 km^{2})
  - Water: 0 sq mi (0.0 km^{2})

Population (2000)
  - Total: 4,466
  - Density: 1,437/sq mi (554.8/km^{2})
- Time zone: UTC-5 (Eastern (EST))
  - Summer (DST): UTC-4 (EDT)
- FIPS code: 39-51217

Monfort Heights South was a census-designated place (CDP) in Green Township, Hamilton County, Ohio, United States. The population was 4,466 at the 2000 census. For the 2010 census the area was merged into the new Monfort Heights CDP.

== Geography ==
Monfort Heights South was located at 39°10′18″N 84°36′23″W (39.171723, -84.606308).

According to the United States Census Bureau, the CDP had a total area of 3.1 square miles (8.0 km^{2}), all of it land.

== Demographics ==
As of the census of 2000, there were 4,466 people, 1,670 households, and 1,302 families residing in the CDP. The population density was 1,437.0 inhabitants per square mile (554.8/km^{2}). There were 1,716 housing units at an average density of 552.2 per square mile (213.2/km^{2}). The racial makeup of the CDP was 97.72% White, 0.72% African American, 0.11% Native American, 0.60% Asian, 0.09% from other races, and 0.76% from two or more races. Hispanic or Latino of any race were 0.52% of the population.

There were 1,670 households, out of which 32.3% had children under the age of 18 living with them, 68.3% were married couples living together, 7.0% had a female householder with no husband present, and 22.0% were non-families. 19.4% of all households were made up of individuals, and 9.1% had someone living alone who was 65 years of age or older. The average household size was 2.67 and the average family size was 3.08.

In the CDP, the population was spread out, with 25.1% under the age of 18, 6.7% from 18 to 24, 26.8% from 25 to 44, 26.0% from 45 to 64, and 15.5% who were 65 years of age or older. The median age was 40 years. For every 100 females, there were 99.1 males. For every 100 females age 18 and over, there were 94.0 males.

The median income for a household in the CDP was $57,481, and the median income for a family was $65,472. Males had a median income of $42,847 versus $31,023 for females. The per capita income for the CDP was $29,839. About 2.4% of families and 5.6% of the population were below the poverty line, including 12.3% of those under age 18 and 4.0% of those age 65 or over.
