= Rodney Guillory =

American businessman

Rodney Guillory is an event promoter based in Los Angeles. Guillory has been called "'the Mayor' of prep basketball in Southern California" due to his success at promoting basketball tournaments.

Guillory's involvement with college basketball players, particularly O. J. Mayo, has been the subject of media and NCAA scrutiny.

== Biography ==
Guillory played basketball at Centennial High School in Compton, California.

== Basketball promotion ==
Guillory's relationship with Fresno State's Tito Maddox and USC's Jeff Trepagnier led to suspensions for both players after the NCAA determined Guillory had been working as a runner for an agent. Maddox and Trepagnier missed nearly one-third of the 2000-01 season after the NCAA determined that Guillory had purchased airfare for the players, a violation because Guillory was representing a sports agency.

=== O. J. Mayo ===
Guillory has had a "close relationship" with Mayo since seventh grade—Mayo has referred to him as a mentor. Mayo and Guillory met at the ABCD summer basketball camp in Teaneck, New Jersey.

Guillory played an important role in recruiting Mayo to play college basketball at USC. USC coach Tim Floyd hadn't recruited Mayo until Guillory "walked into Floyd's office" and said Mayo wanted to attend USC; Mayo's interest was based on Los Angeles's position as a major media market, host of an NBA franchise (Los Angeles Lakers), and USC's lack of an "established tradition" in basketball. Floyd, aware of Guillory's role in the NCAA sanctions on Maddox and Trepagnier asked USC athletic department investigators to look for "irregularities in Guillory’s relationship with Mayo". None were found, according to Floyd.

A 2008 report from ESPN's Outside the Lines alleged that, while at USC, Mayo received thousands of dollars in cash and gifts from Louis Johnson and Rodney Guillory, who were allegedly acting as "runners" for Bill Duffy Associates Sports Management (BDA Sports). The report alleges that Guillory received about $200,000 from BDA Sports; in exchange, Mayo would sign with BDA Sports when he turned professional. Mayo signed with agent Calvin Andrews of BDA Sports prior to the 2008 NBA draft. Mayo originally signed with Duffy, but he switched agents after those allegations were made public.
