= Kerbisher & Malt =

English restaurant chain

- Their second branch in Ealing
- Founded: 2011
- Founder: Saul Reuben, Nick Crossley
- Headquarters: London, England
- Number of locations: Brook Green; Ealing; Mortlake; Clapham; EC1
- Products: fish and chips
- Website: http://www.kerbisher.co.uk/

Kerbisher & Malt was a chain of fish and chip shops in London. The first branch was established in the West London suburb of Brook Green by chef Saul Reuben and his brother-in-law Nick Crossley in 2011. "Kerbisher" was a fishing boat crewed by Crossley's grandfather, who was a herring fisherman, while "Malt" is the malt vinegar commonly served with fish and chips.

By 2015, Kerbisher & Malt had six restaurants across London, but these were gradually closed, with the last branch in Brook Green being put on the market in February 2020. The chain was owned by CRFC Ltd, a private company limited by shares, which was dissolved in 2021.

== Reception ==
Zoe Williams reviewed their opening for the Sunday Telegraph, praising the freshness of the fish and the traditional quality of the chips, "I almost want to write a love poem to the chips ... Here, they've returned to first principles ... They've made chips that remind me of being a kid and going to the chip-shop after swimming..."

== See also ==
- List of fish and chip restaurants
