= Lou Groen =

American entrepreneur and inventor of the Filet-O-Fish sandwich

- Born: Louis M. Groen; August 8, 1917; Cincinnati, Ohio, U.S.
- Died: May 30, 2011 (aged 93); Cincinnati, Ohio, U.S.
- Occupations: Businessman; entrepreneur; early McDonald's restaurant franchisee, food designer

Louis M. Groen (August 8, 1917 – May 30, 2011) was an American entrepreneur, businessman, and lifelong resident of Cincinnati, Ohio. Groen invented the Filet-O-Fish sandwich in 1962. He invented the sandwich at his struggling McDonald's restaurant to satisfy his customers. At the time, most of his customers were Roman Catholic, and abstained from eating meat on Fridays. The Filet-O-Fish, served with cheese and tartar sauce, is now served at McDonald's restaurants throughout the world.

== Biography ==
=== Early life and career ===
Born and raised in Cincinnati, Ohio, Groen graduated from North College Hill High School in 1935. At his peak, Groen owned 43 McDonald's restaurants in the Ohio and northern Kentucky region, eventually selling them back to the McDonald's corporation, including a longtime business partner Ed Cummings's brother and son. He held on to two, in Northgate and Tylersville, until his own son Paul took them over in 1994.

=== Career with McDonald's ===
A prominent McDonald's hamburger restaurant franchisee from 1959 to 1986, after he introduced his sandwich in 1962, McDonald's Corp. founder and CEO Ray Kroc was not exactly thrilled at the idea of a fish sandwich on his franchise menu, for he thought that he had a better idea, a "Hula" burger, which had simply a breaded, fried pineapple slice in between a toasted bun and a slice of cheese. Recalls Groen: "I told Ray (Kroc) about it (the idea of the Filet-O-Fish sandwich) and he said, “You’re always coming up here with a bunch of crap!” “I don’t want my stores stunk up with the smell of fish.” Groen engaged in a wager with Kroc on whose idea would sell better. Groen recalls again: "I called in (to McDonald's) and asked, "How many sandwiches did (Kroc) sell?" They (McDonald's) said "I can't tell you.” They asked “How many did you sell?" I said "350!" Then, they said "It's on the menu!"

== Death ==
Groen died peacefully of natural causes on May 30, 2011, in Cincinnati.

== See also ==
- History of McDonald's
