= Filet-O-Fish =

Fish sandwich sold by McDonald's

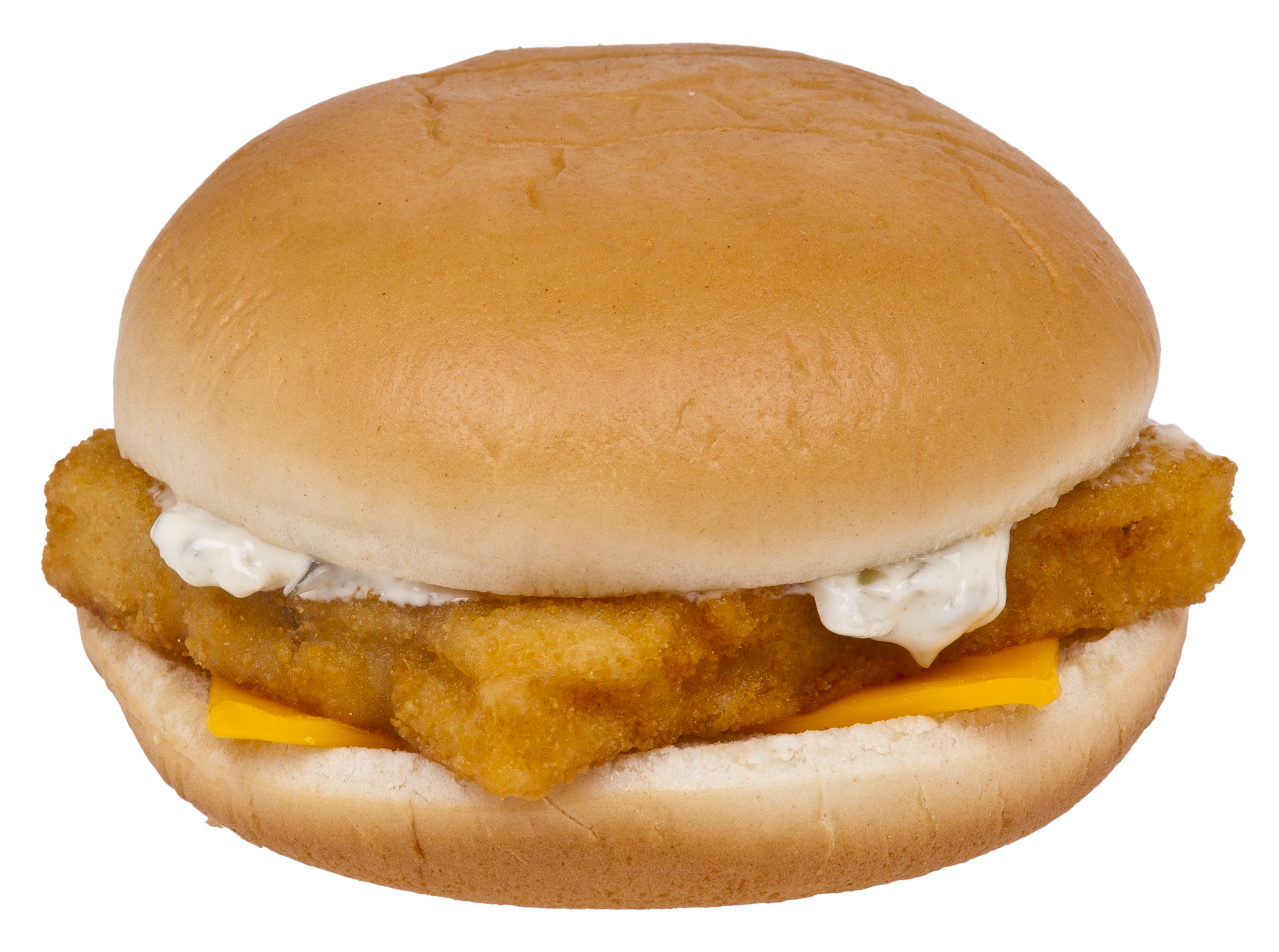

Nutritional value per 1 sandwich (141 g)
- Energy: 380 kcal (1,600 kJ)
- Carbohydrates: 38 g (13%)
- Sugars: 5 g
- Dietary fiber: 2 g (7%)
- Fat: 19 g (29%)
- Saturated: 4 g (19%)
- Trans: 0 g
- Protein: 17 g
Vitamins and minerals
Vitamins	Quantity %DV^{†}
Vitamin A	240 IU
Vitamin C	0% 0 mg
Minerals	Quantity %DV^{†}
Calcium	5% 60 mg
Iron	11% 2 mg
Sodium	24% 560 mg
- Other constituents: Quantity
- Energy from fat: 170 kcal (710 kJ)
- Cholesterol: 45 mg (15%)
- May vary outside US market. 360 kcal (1,500 kJ) in UK. Some restaurants publish nutritional information for the sandwich with the tartar sauce removed.
- ^{†}Percentages estimated using US recommendations for adults. Source: McDonald's

The Filet-O-Fish is a brand name of fish sandwich sold by the international fast food restaurant chain McDonald's. It was created in 1962 by Lou Groen, a McDonald's franchise owner in the predominantly Catholic suburb of Monfort Heights outside Cincinnati, Ohio, in response to declining hamburger sales on Fridays due to the practice of abstaining from meat on that day. While the fish composition of the sandwich has changed throughout the years to cater to taste preferences and address supply limitations, the framework of its ingredients has remained constant; a fried breaded fish fillet, a steamed bun, tartar sauce, and pasteurized American cheese.

== History ==
The sandwich was invented in 1962 by businessman Lou Groen, a McDonald's franchise owner in Cincinnati, Ohio. His store at 5425 West North Bend Road was in a predominantly Catholic neighborhood, which led to falling hamburger sales on Fridays resulting from the practice of abstaining from meat on Fridays (until 1966, Catholics abstained from meat on Fridays year round). The product was named by Cye Landy of Cye Landy Advertising Agency, which was the advertising firm for that particular McDonald's franchise.

The sandwich was the first non-hamburger menu item brought in by Ray Kroc, who purchased McDonald's in 1961. Kroc made a deal with Groen: they would sell two non-meat sandwiches on a Friday, Kroc's Hula Burger (grilled pineapple with cheese on a cold bun) and the Filet-O-Fish, and whichever sold the most would be added to the permanent menu. The Filet-O-Fish "won hands down" and was added to menus throughout 1963 until reaching nationwide status in 1965.

In 1981, when an owner of a New Zealand fisheries company was dissatisfied with the pollock Filet-O-Fish he purchased at the Courtenay Place, Wellington restaurant, he said to the manager that he could make a better-tasting fish fillet. He was handed a box of fillets and told to come back with identical, better-tasting fillets. He substituted the pollock with red cod and after the manager was satisfied with the better-tasting red cod fillets, ended up in agreement to supply the Courtenay Place restaurant (and eventually several other New Zealand restaurants) with the red cod fillets. The similar-tasting hoki was substituted several years later, due to its competitive market value and its boneless fillets, and eventually was introduced widely in the early 1990s when global pollock stocks were facing low numbers.

McDonald's removed the Filet-O-Fish from its menus in the United States on September 26, 1996, and replaced it with the Fish Filet Deluxe sandwich, which was part of McDonald's ill-fated Deluxe line of sandwiches. However, the Filet-O-Fish was brought back to its menus on a gradual basis starting in the middle of 1997, due to overwhelming letters and petitions, receiving the larger fish patty from the Fish Filet Deluxe. The Fish Filet Deluxe itself was discontinued at most restaurants early in 1998, while others continued to offer it until 2000, when it was finally removed from all McDonald's menus.

In November 2007, McDonald's lowered the use of New Zealand hoki and increased the use of Alaska pollock, due to declining New Zealand hoki fishery sustainability and large cutbacks in the total allowable commercial catch of hoki by the New Zealand Ministry of Fisheries – from 250,000 tonnes in 1997 to 90,000 tonnes in 2007. McDonald's originally used Atlantic cod, before declining cod catches forced McDonald's to find sustainable fish elsewhere. McDonald's is trying to maintain fish only from areas certified as sustainable by the Marine Stewardship Council, but that is becoming more difficult each year. Hoki is still a major ingredient.

As of March 2009, the Marine Stewardship Council placed the Alaska pollock fisheries in a re-assessment program due to catch numbers declining by over 30% between 2005 and 2008, and by-catch problems with salmon.

As of January 2013, the Marine Stewardship Council stated that the pollock comes from suppliers with sustainable fishing practices, and McDonald's packaging and promotion will reflect that change.

In 2019, McDonald's sent a cease-and-desist letter to a small Canadian restaurant that was selling a fish sandwich it called the "Effing Filet O' Fish". McDonald's claimed that the restaurant's use of that term violated McDonald's registered "Filet-O-Fish" trademark. In response, the restaurant agreed to stop using "Filet O' Fish" to describe its fish sandwich.

== Product description ==
The fish used for the Filet-O-Fish patty in various markets is as follows:

- United States – As of May 2020, contains a battered, fried fish fillet made from Alaska pollock.
- Republic of Ireland – As of October 2019 either hoki or Alaska pollock may be served.
- United Kingdom – As of May 2020, contains white hoki or pollock in crispy breadcrumbs.
- New Zealand – Contains a blend of New Zealand Hoki and Alaska pollock.
- Indonesia – Contains Nile tilapia sourced from local fish farmers around Lake Toba in North Sumatra.

Half a slice of cheese is used in each Filet-O-Fish sandwich; McDonald's states the reason is to prevent the cheese from overwhelming the taste.

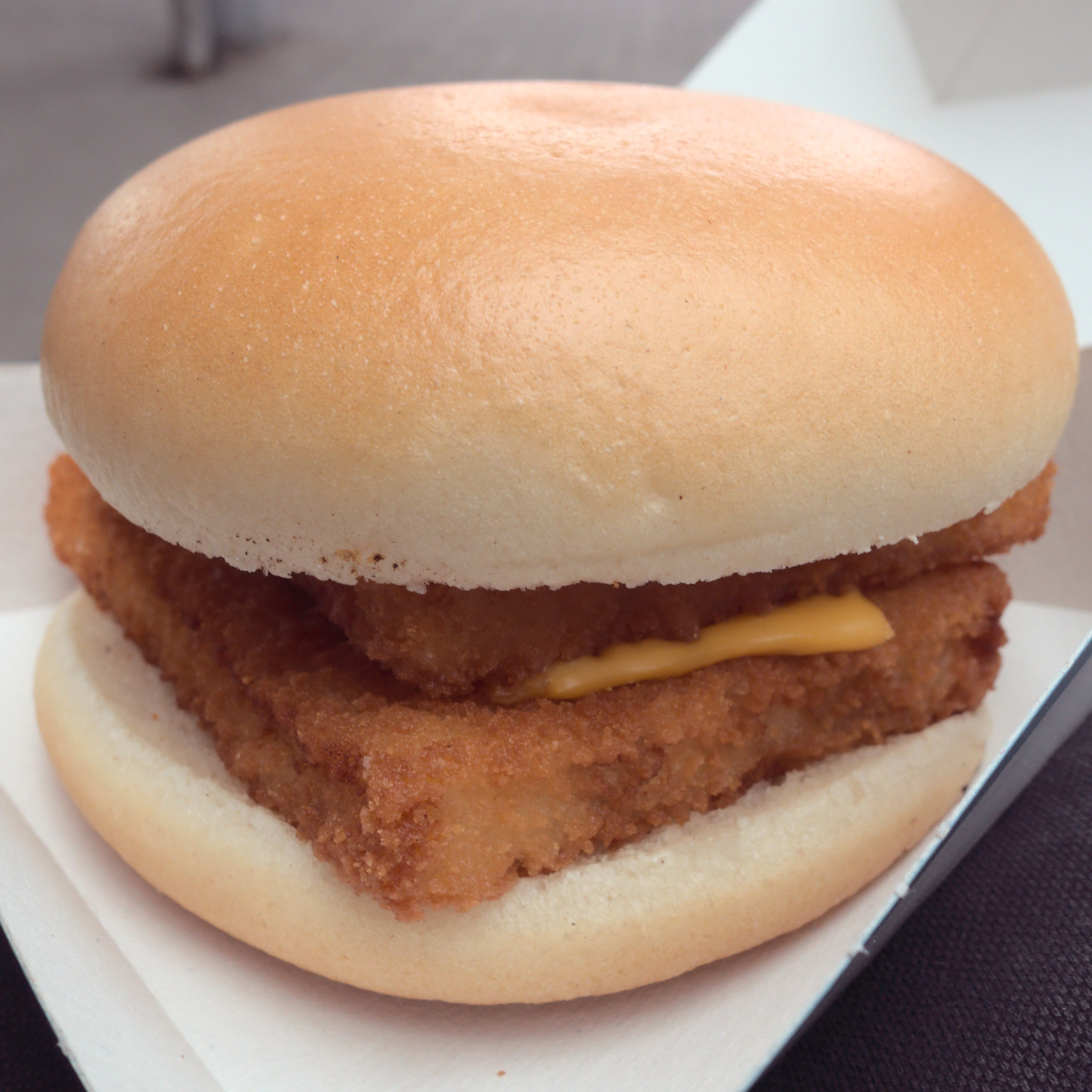
Double Filet-O-Fish sold in Austria

The Double Filet-O-Fish (a Filet-O-Fish with two fish fillet patties instead of one) is available in some regions.

== Society and culture ==
The Filet-O-Fish is often referred to as a burger outside the US, particularly in Australia, India, New Zealand, and the UK.

=== Religious observation ===
The Filet-O-Fish, originally created for Western Christians observing the Friday Fast, remains popularly associated with this community, with US sales significantly rising around Lent. The practice has inspired other fast food chains to offer seafood options during Lent.

This sandwich is also popular among Jewish and Muslim communities due to its ingredients being more aligned with kashrut and halal rules than McDonald's other offerings. The sandwich contains fish, milk in the cheese, and egg yolks in the sauce. In addition, the fish patty is cooked in a separate frypot to avoid giving other items a fishy taste. Certification-wise, the sandwich is certified as halal in the UAE and a few other Muslim-majority countries; it is also available in kosher-supervised restaurants of McDonald's Israel. However, not all Israeli locations are certified and stores in the UK and the US do not participate in certification.

=== Variants ===
In France, Spain, and Belgium, a variation of the sandwich is sold as the "McFish". The French McFish does not include cheese and replaces tartar sauce with ketchup. In Indonesia, it is known as the Fish Fillet Burger.

== See also ==
- Fish finger sandwich
