= Turchin =

Turchin or Turchyn (feminine: Turchyn, Turchyna) is an East Slavic surname literally meaning "Turkish person". Notable people with the surname include:

- Anastasiya Turchyn (born 1995), Ukrainian judoka
- Carolyn Turchin (born 1945), American magistrate judge
- Danila Turchin (born 1978), Uzbekistani sprint canoer
- Dziamyan Turchyn (born 1985), Belarusian sprint canoer
- Eddie Turchin (1917–1982), American baseball player
- Igor Turchin (fencer) (born 1982), Russian fencer
- Ihor Turchyn (1936–1993), Soviet-Ukrainian handball coach
- John Basil Turchin, anglicized name of Ivan Turchaninov (1821–1901), Union Army brigadier general in the American Civil War
  - Madame Turchin (1825–1904), general's wife
- Peter Turchin (born 1957), Russian-American biologist
- Valentin Turchin (1931–2010), Soviet cybernetician and computer scientist
- Victor Turchin (born 1955 1955), Ukrainian swimming coach
- Yaryna Turchyn (born 1975), Ukrainian political scientist
- Zinaida Turchyna (born 1946), Ukrainian handball player

== See also ==
- Turczyn (disambiguation)
- Turčin
- Turchino (disambiguation)
