= Turchino =

Turchino may refer to:

- Passo del Turchino, mountain pass, Italy
- Turchino Lake, Modena, Emilia-Romagna, Italy
- Turchino, Udmurtia, Village in Udmurtia, Russia
