= Radome =

Weatherproof structures enclosing antennea that emits radiation

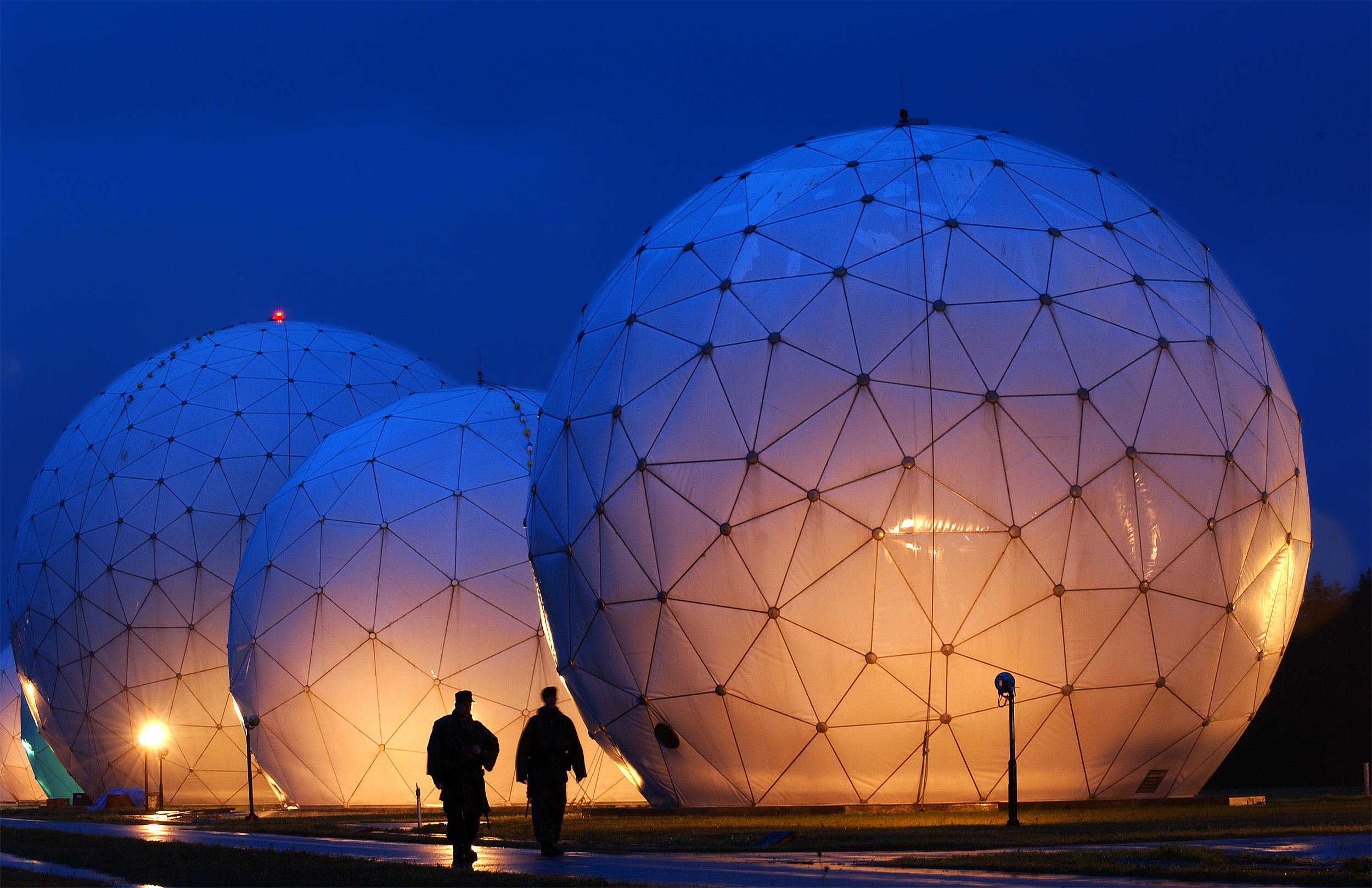
Geodesic radomes at the Misawa Security Operations Center, Misawa, Japan

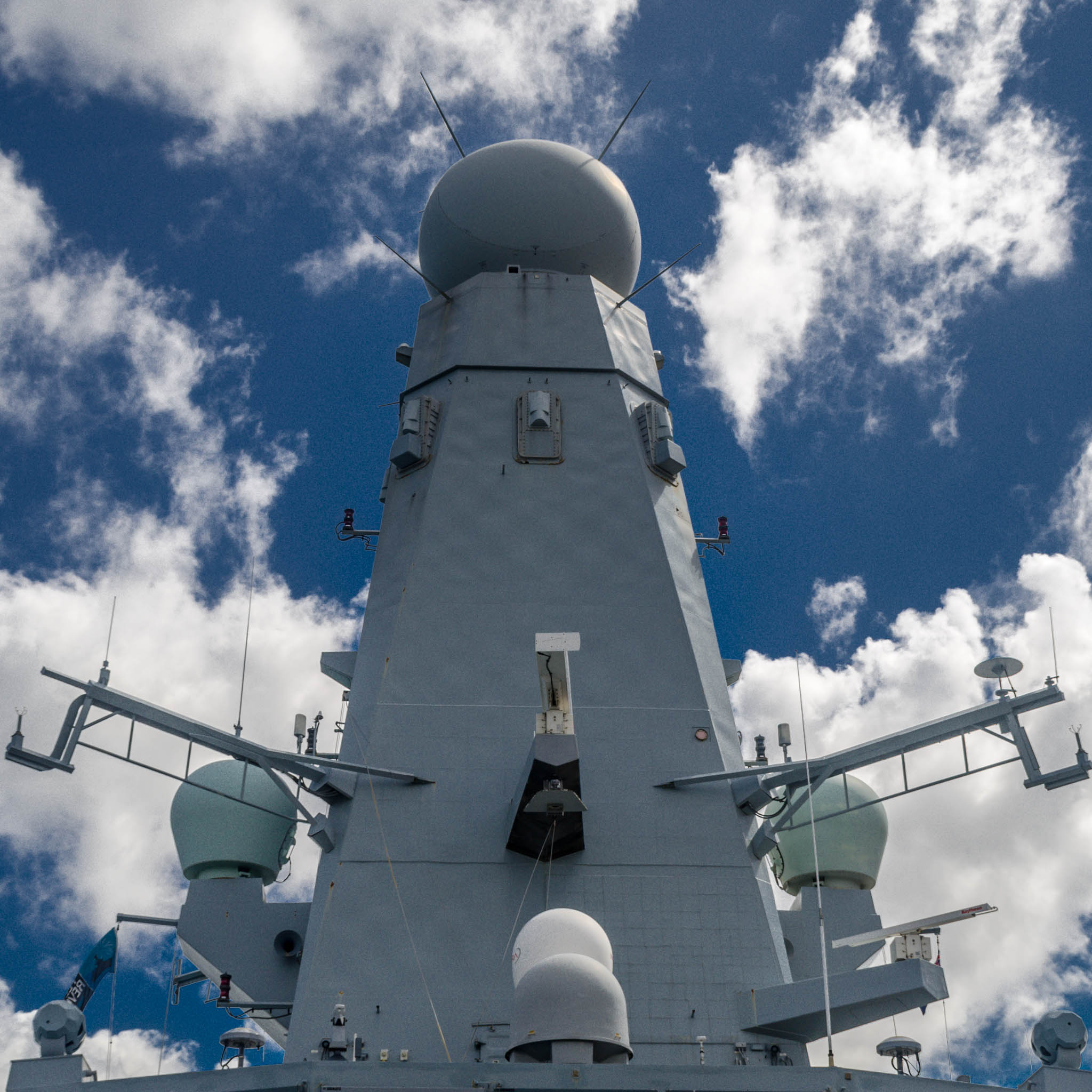
Spherical radome mounted atop the mainmast of a Type 45 destroyer

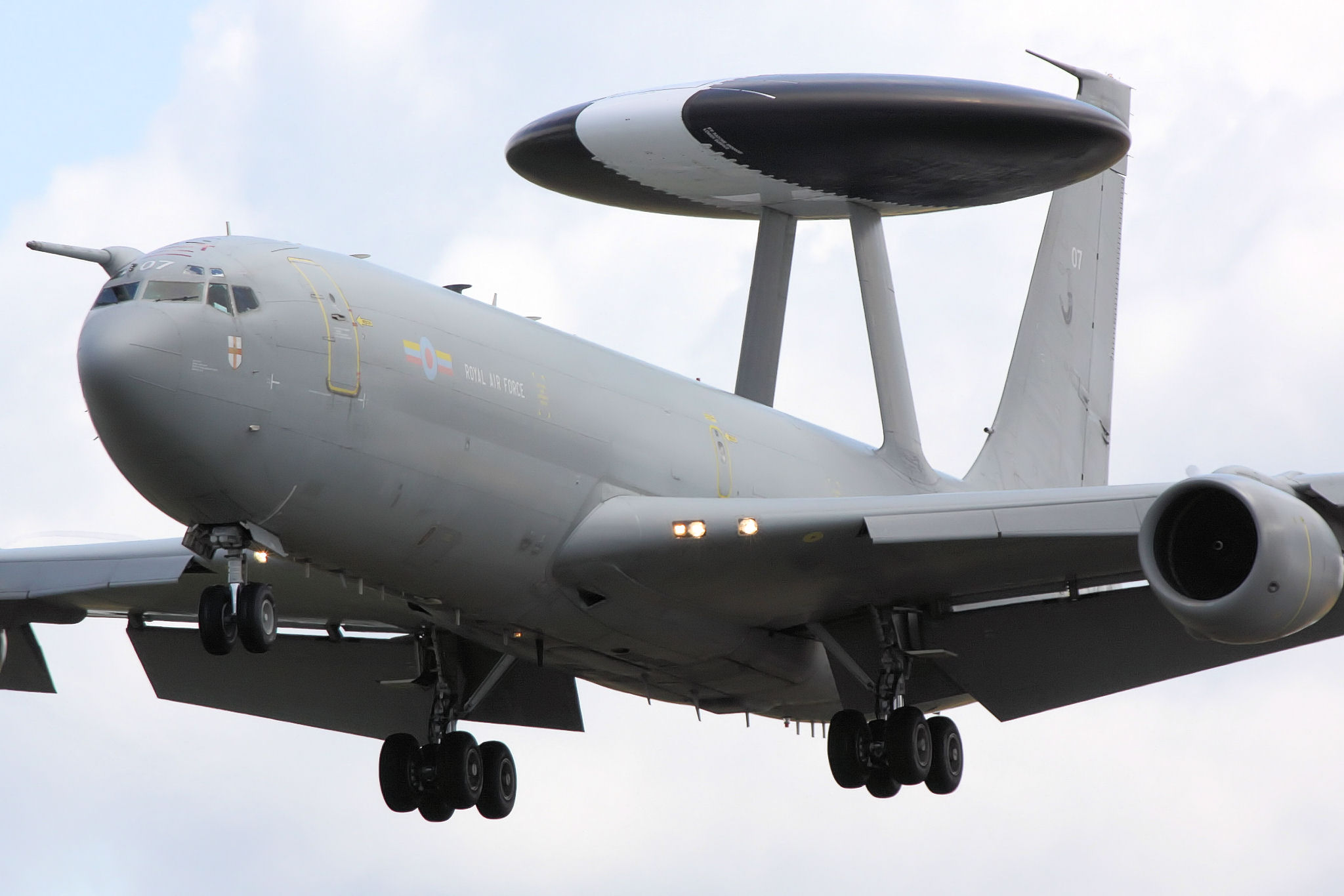
A Boeing E-3 Sentry, showing its rotodome mounted above the fuselage

A radome (a portmanteau of "radar" and "dome") is a structural, weatherproof enclosure that protects a radar antenna. The radome is constructed of material transparent to radio waves. Radomes protect the antenna from weather and conceal antenna electronic equipment from view. They also protect nearby personnel from being accidentally struck by quickly rotating antennas.

Radomes can be constructed in several shapes – spherical, geodesic, planar, etc. – depending on the particular application, using various construction materials such as fiberglass, polytetrafluoroethylene (PTFE)-coated fabric, and others.

In addition to radar protection, radomes on aircraft platforms also act as fairings that streamline the antenna system, thus reducing drag. When found on fixed-wing aircraft with forward-looking radar, as are commonly used for object or weather detection, the nose cones often additionally serve as radomes. On airborne early warning and control (AEW&C) aircraft (e.g. the American E-3 Sentry), a discus-shaped rotating radome, often called a "rotodome", is mounted on the top of the fuselage for 360-degree scanning coverage. Some newer AEW&C configurations instead use three 120-degree phased array modules inside a stationary radome, examples being the Chinese KJ-2000 and Indian Netra AEW&C. On fixed-wing and rotary-wing aircraft using microwave satellite for beyond-line-of-sight communication, radomes often appear as bulged "blisters" on the fuselage.

The use of radomes dates back as far as 1941.

The air supported radome built by Walter Bird in 1948 at the Cornell Aeronautical Laboratory is the first pneumatic construction built in history.

== Use ==
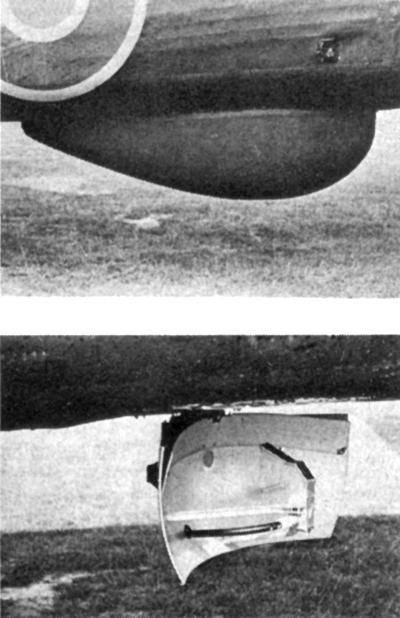
One of the first radomes. The radome (top) covers the H2S radar system rotating antenna (bottom) on a Halifax bomber

A radome is often used to prevent ice and freezing rain from accumulating on antennas. In the case of a spinning radar parabolic antenna, the radome also protects the antenna from debris and rotational irregularities due to wind. Its shape is easily identified by its hardshell, which has strong properties against being damaged.

=== Stationary antennas ===
For stationary antennas, excessive amounts of ice can de-tune the antenna to the point where its impedance at the input frequency rises drastically, causing the voltage standing wave ratio (VSWR) to rise as well. This reflected power goes back to the transmitter, where it can cause overheating. A foldback circuit can act to prevent this; however, one drawback of its use is that it causes the station's output power to drop dramatically, reducing its range. A radome avoids that by covering the antenna's exposed parts with a sturdy, weatherproof material, typically fiberglass, keeping debris or ice away from the antenna, thus preventing any serious issues. One of the main driving forces behind the development of fiberglass as a structural material was the need during World War II for radomes. When considering structural load, the use of a radome greatly reduces wind load in both normal and iced conditions. Many tower sites require or prefer the use of radomes for wind loading benefits and for protection from falling ice or debris.

Where radomes might be considered unsightly if near the ground, electric antenna heaters could be used instead. Usually running on direct current, the heaters do not interfere physically or electrically with the alternating current of the radio transmission.

=== Radar dishes ===
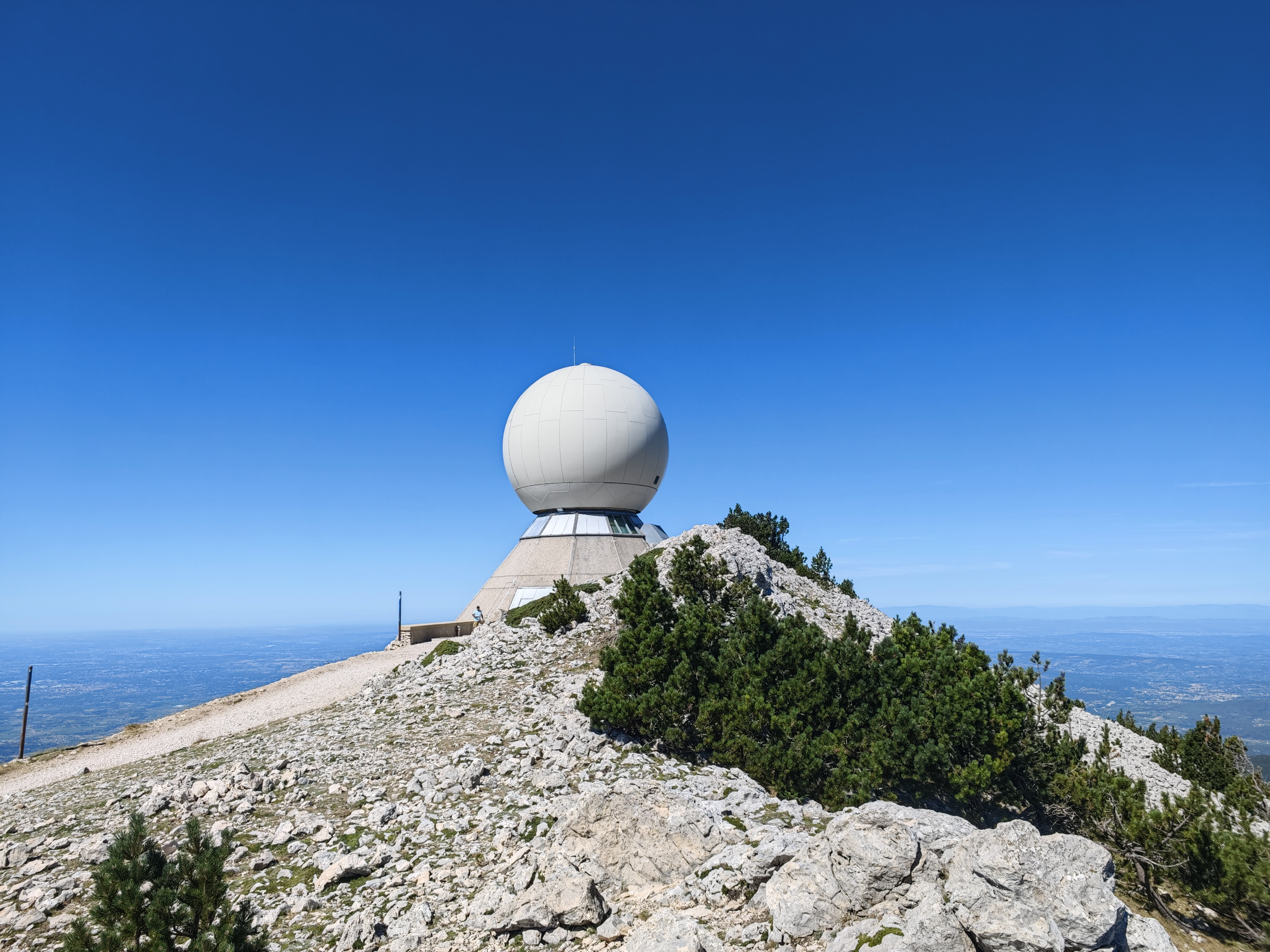
Spherical radar dome on Mont Ventoux, France, protecting a fixed mountain-top radar installation.

For radar dishes, a single, large, ball-shaped dome also protects the rotational mechanism and the sensitive electronics, and is heated in colder climates to prevent icing.

The RAF Menwith Hill electronic surveillance base, which includes over 30 radomes, is widely believed to regularly intercept satellite communications. At Menwith Hill, the radome enclosures prevent observers from seeing the direction of the antennas, and therefore which satellites are being targeted. Similarly, radomes prevent observation of antennas used in ECHELON facilities.

The United States Air Force Aerospace Defense Command operated and maintained dozens of air defense radar stations in the contiguous United States and Alaska during the Cold War. Most of the radars used at these ground stations were protected by rigid or inflatable radomes. The radomes were typically at least 15 m (50 ft) in diameter and the radomes were attached to standardized radar tower buildings that housed the radar transmitter, receiver and antenna.

=== Telecommunications ===
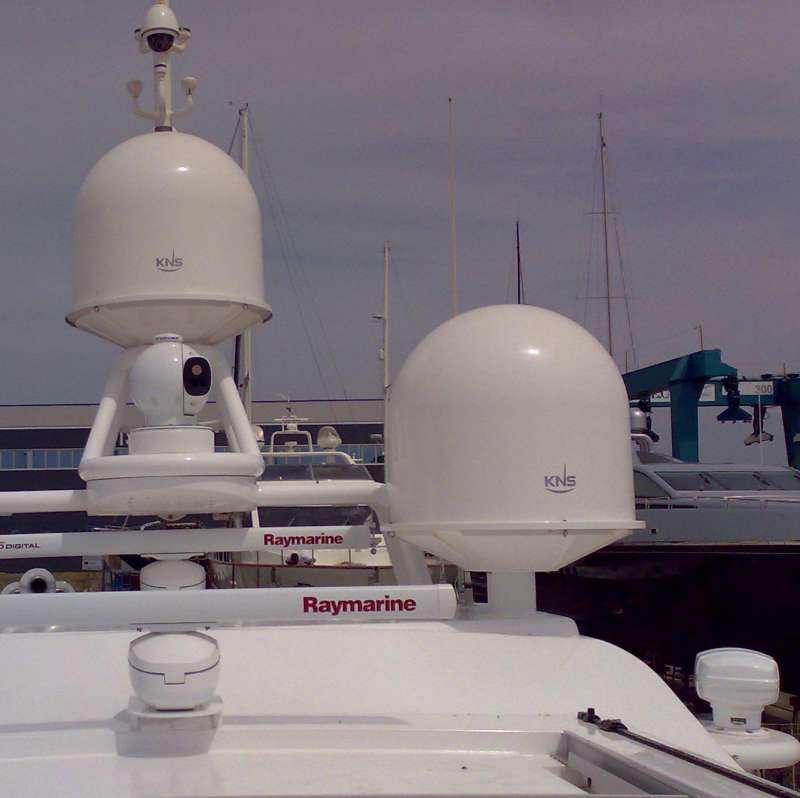
A yacht fitted with small KNS tracking dishes for SES Broadband for Maritime, protected by radomes

Radomes were also used for civil usage. For example in 1962 a radome, located in Pleumeur-Bodou, France, protected the PB1 antenna, which was supposed to receive mondovision TV stream from the Telstar satellite, which received data from the United States. Today, this radome has become a museum, its American twin having been dismantled along with the antenna it protected.

=== Maritime satellites ===
For maritime satellite communications service, radomes are widely used to protect dish antennas which are continually tracking fixed satellites while the ship experiences pitch, roll and yaw movements. Large cruise ships and oil tankers may have radomes over 3 m in diameter covering antennas for broadband transmissions for television, voice, data, and the Internet, while recent developments allow similar services from smaller installations such as the 85 cm motorised dish used in the SES Broadband for Maritime system. Small private yachts may use radomes as small as 26 cm in diameter for voice and low-speed data.

== See also ==
- Radom
- Radom (disambiguation)
