= Here's your mule =

Here's your mule or Where's my mule? (Mister, here's your mule or Mister, where's my mule?) was a Confederate catch phrase during the Civil War, often noted in Civil War histories. It resulted in several Civil War songs, including "Here's Your Mule", "How Are You? John Morgan", and "Turchin's Got Your Mule". It is also credited with contributing to General Bragg's failure to rally his troops at Missionary Ridge.

== Origins ==
Several differing accounts of the origin of the phrase are given. The most common involves soldiers in a camp taking a clever peddler's unattended mule and hiding it. When the peddler discovers the mule missing, he goes around the camp inquiring about it. After a while, a soldier would holler, "Mister, here's your mule." When the peddler went toward the call, a soldier in another part of the camp would yell the same, "Mister, here's your mule." That continued and took the peddler all over the camp. Variation of the story supposedly took place at the Camp of Instruction in Jackson, Tennessee, Beauregard's camp at Centreville, Virginia, and others. Another explanation of this phrase ascribes it to a man who found a mule, reported by a Southern newspaper.

== Songs ==
=== "Here's Your Mule" ===
"Here's Your Mule"
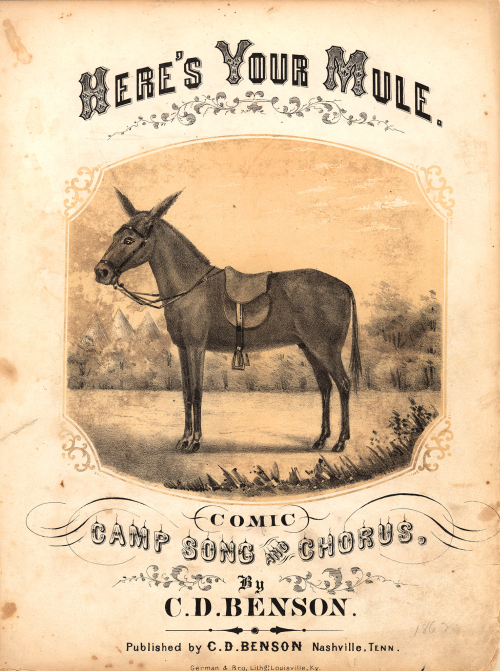
- Sheet music cover, 1862

Song
- Published: 1862
- Songwriter: C.D. Benson

"Here's Your Mule" was written by C.D Benson and published in 1862, both by himself in Nashville, Tennessee, and by John Church, Jr. in Cincinnati. The song tells one of the traditional stories about soldiers hiding a farmer's mule and yelling "Mister, here's your mule" while taking the animal from place to place endlessly. The chorus is:

Come on, come on, Come on, old man,
And don't be made a fool,
By ev'ry one, You meet in camp,
With "Mister, Here's your mule."

Following John Morgan's 1863 raid, sheet music destined for the Southern market had a chorus pasted in immediately after the final verse:

Come on, come on, come on, old man,
And don't be made a fool;
I'll tell you the truth as best I can:
"John Morgan's got your Mule!"

=== "Turchin's Got Your Mule" ===
The Union parodied the song in 1863 with "Turchin's Got Your Mule", an account of John B. Turchin's 1862 foray into Alabama where his soldiers seized Southern goods and property. The song, perhaps written by a cavalryman with the First Ohio, tells of a plantation owner trying to retrieve his slaves and livestock. The first verse and chorus are:

A planter came to camp one day,
His niggers for to find;
His mules had also gone astray,
And stock of every kind.
The planter tried to get them back,
And then was made a fool,
For every one he met in camp
Cried, "Mister, here's your mule."

Chorus
Go back, go back, go back, old scamp,
And don't be made a fool;
Your niggers they are all in camp,
And Turchin's got your mule.

=== "How Are You? John Morgan" ===
"How Are You? John Morgan"
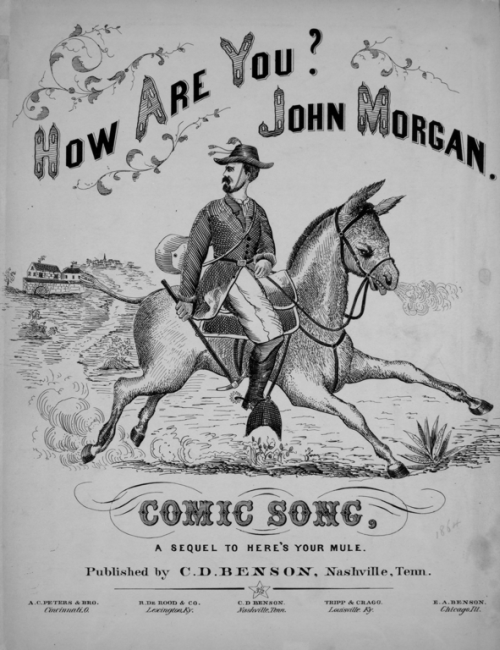
- Cover, sheet music, 1864

Song
- Published: 1864
- Songwriter: C.D. Benson

C. D. Benson came out with ""How Are You? John Morgan" in 1864 after John Hunt Morgan escaped from the Ohio Penitentiary in 1863. The chorus is:

Then raise the shout, the glorious shout,
John Morgan's caught at last,
Proclaim it loud, the land throughout,
He's in to prison fast.

'"Chorus to last verse:
Upon his Mule, He's gone they say
To Dixie's Promised Land,
And at no very distant day
To lead a new command.

=== "Here's Your Mule" ("My Maryland"/"O Tannenbaum") ===
A common Confederate version of unknown authorship was sung to the tune of "My Maryland". One stanza of this version is:

Hark! Morgan's boys are on a raid,
Here's your Mule, O here's your mule!
To meet the foe they're not afraid,
Here's your Mule, O here's your mule!
And when bluecoats, see them come,
They stop and fire and break and run,
And then begins John Morgan's fun,
Here's your Mule, O here's your mule!

Another variant of "Here's Your Mule" using the tune to "My Maryland" ("O Tannenbaum"), also of unknown authorship, was published in Nashville's Daily Union, July 14, 1863. The opening verses is:

Come Soldiers, listen to my lay
Here's your mule, your long eared mule
I'll sing the warriors of the day,
Here's your mule, &c.
Old General Bragg, he leads the way,
And moves his army twice a day,
And once at night, I've heard them say
Here's your mule, your long eared mule.

== Bibliography ==
- Benson, C.D. "Here's Your Mule (Comic Camp Song and Chorus)" (Sheet music). Nashville, Tenn: C.D. Benson (1862).
- Benson, C.D. "Here's Your Mule (Comic Song)" (Sheet music). Cincinnati: John Church, Jr. (1862).
- Benson, C.D. "How Are You? John Morgan. (Comic Song. A Sequel to Here's Your Mule)" (Sheet music). Nashville, Tenn: C.D. Benson (1864).
- Burnett, Alf. Incidents of the War: Humorous, Pathetic, and Descriptive. Cincinnati: Rickey & Carroll, Publishers (1863).
- Curry, W. L. (compiler). Four Years in the Saddle: History of the First Regiment Ohio Cavalry. Columbus, Ohio: Champlin Printing Co. (1898)
- "Here's Your Mule". Daily Union (Nashville, Tenn.), July 14, 1863. Tennessee Civil War Sourcebook, James B. Jones (ed).
- Moore, Frank (ed.). The Rebellion Record: A diary of American Events. New York: G.P. Putnam, Henry Holt (1864).
- Pollard, Edward A. The Lost Cause: A New Southern History of the War of the Confederates. New York: E.B. Treat & Co. (1867).
- Ridley, Bromfield L. Battles and Sketches of the Army of Tennessee. Mexico, Mo.: Missouri Printing & Publishing Co. (1906).
- Walsh, William S. Handy-book of Literary Curiosities. Philadelphia: J.B. Lippincott Company (1909).
