= Madame Turchin =

Wife of John Basil Turchin

Nadine Turchin
- Born: Nadezhda Antonovna Lvova; November 26, 1826; Russian Empire
- Died: July 17, 1904 (aged 77); Radom, Illinois, United States
- Known for: Wife of Union Brig. Gen. John Basil Turchin

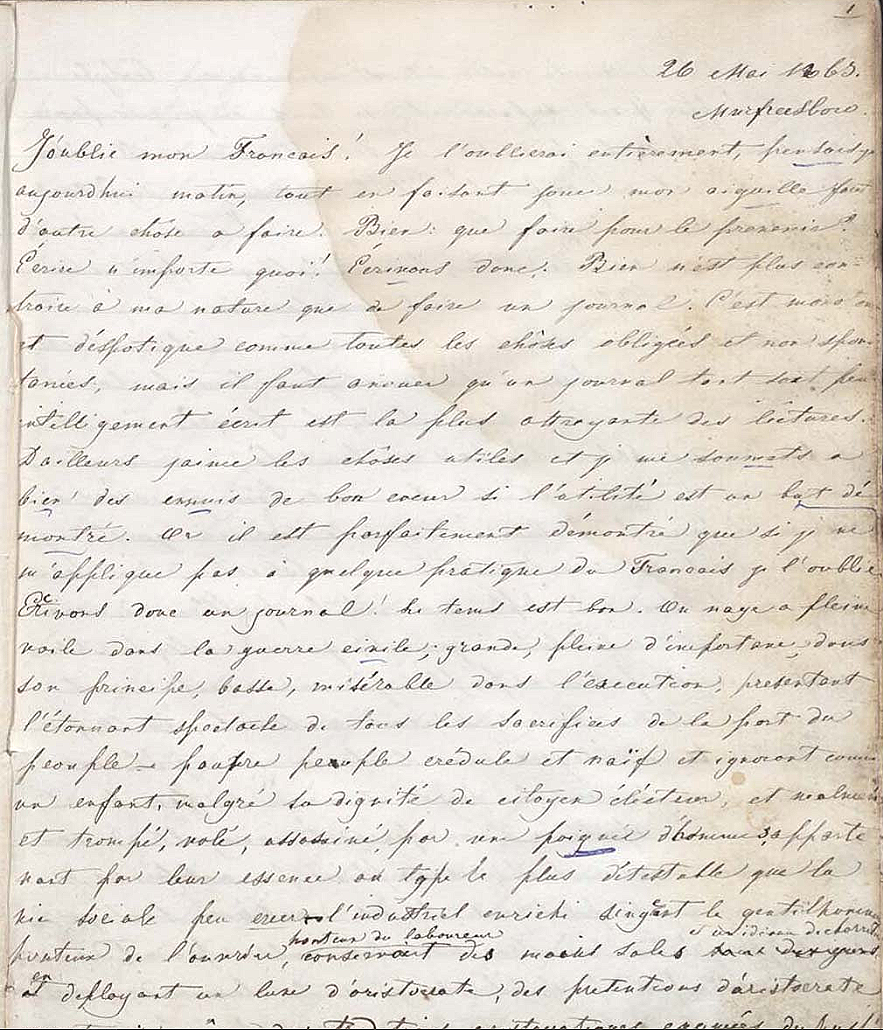
A page from Nadine A. Turchin's diary, 1863

Nadezhda Antonovna Turchaninova (née Lvova; Russian: Надежда Антоновна Турчанинова; November 26, 1826 – July 17, 1904), also known by her anglicized name of Nadine A. Turchin, was the wife of Union Brigadier General John Basil Turchin. During the American Civil War, she traveled with her husband on his military campaigns and at times acted as his surrogate in command of his troops. She kept a detailed diary that remains a leading eyewitness account of her husband's colorful career. She became widely known in the Union army as "Madame Turchin."

== Biography ==
Born as Nadezhda Antonovna Lvova in Russia, the daughter of an officer in the Russian Army, she married Ivan Vasilyevich Turchaninov on May 10, 1856, in Kraków in the Austrian-ruled Kingdom of Galicia and Lodomeria (present-day Poland). The couple immigrated to the United States in 1856. Arriving in the US and eventually settling on a farm in New York, they anglicized their names. They later moved to Philadelphia and then to Chicago, where John Basil Turchin worked as a topographical engineer for the Illinois Central Railroad.

With the outbreak of the Civil War in early 1861, John Basil Turchin was chosen by the soldiers of the 19th Illinois Infantry as their Colonel. Later he would become the only Russian-born general to serve in the Union Army. Nadine traveled with her husband throughout the war despite orders against wives traveling on campaigns.

It is alleged that during her husband's brief illness in 1862, Nadine "took his place as regimental commander", but she likely did not assume full command. Stories of her military savvy and heroism were reported by soldiers from Illinois and in later newspaper articles about her.

When Colonel Turchin was accused of dereliction of duties, she went to Chicago and then to Washington, D.C., to rally the public in his defense. A plea for help reached the White House, and President Lincoln promoted Turchin to brigadier general — thus invalidating his court-martial sentence. On August 8, 1862, the Chicago Times wrote, "truly in the lottery matrimonial Col. Turchin had the good fortune to draft an invaluable prize."

In 1863, Nadine started a regular diary that included her opinions on her husband's fellow officers and commentary on battles that she participated in, including the Battle of Chickamauga of September 1863. During the battle, she stayed with the brigade and division wagons, which were parked just on the western edge of the battlefield, and she climbed up onto the eastern hills of Missionary Ridge to observe events during the Battle of Missionary Ridge. She left detailed accounts of both battles, in effect being the only Union female diarist of those battles.

After the war, the Turchins settled in Radom, Illinois. They had no children. After her husband's death in 1901, Nadine applied for and received a pension of $30 a month as a military widow instead of as a nurse or soldier. Nadine Turchin died in 1904 and was buried next to her husband in Mound City National Cemetery in southern Illinois.

== Recognition ==
Nadine A. Turchin earned a place in America's collective memory. On April 25, 1961, Fred Schwengel, while speaking in the United States Congress about women in the American Civil War, said,

Have you ever heard of Madame Turchin, the immigrant from Russia, symbol of foreign aid, who went with her husband, a colonel in the Union Army, and served as nurse and mother confessor to the regiment. And, once when her husband became ill, she took over and led the regiment into battle with confidence and poise and won the skirmish.

== See also ==
- History of women in the United States
