= Radom (disambiguation) =

Radom is a city in Masovian Voivodeship, Poland.

Radom may also refer to:

== Places ==
=== In Poland ===
- Radom County
- Radom Voivodeship, an administrative division of Poland (1975–1998)
- Radom Department, an administrative division of the Duchy of Warsaw (1806–1815)
- Radom, Greater Poland Voivodeship, a village in west-central Poland

=== Elsewhere ===
- Radom, Illinois, in the United States
- Radom National Park in Sudan

== Other ==
- FB "Łucznik" Radom, Polish defence industry enterprise
- RADOM-7, Bulgarian space radiation measurement instrument

== See also ==
- Radome, an enclosure that protects a radar antenna
- Radon, a chemical element
