= Turchino Lake =

Lake in Emilia-Romagna, Italy

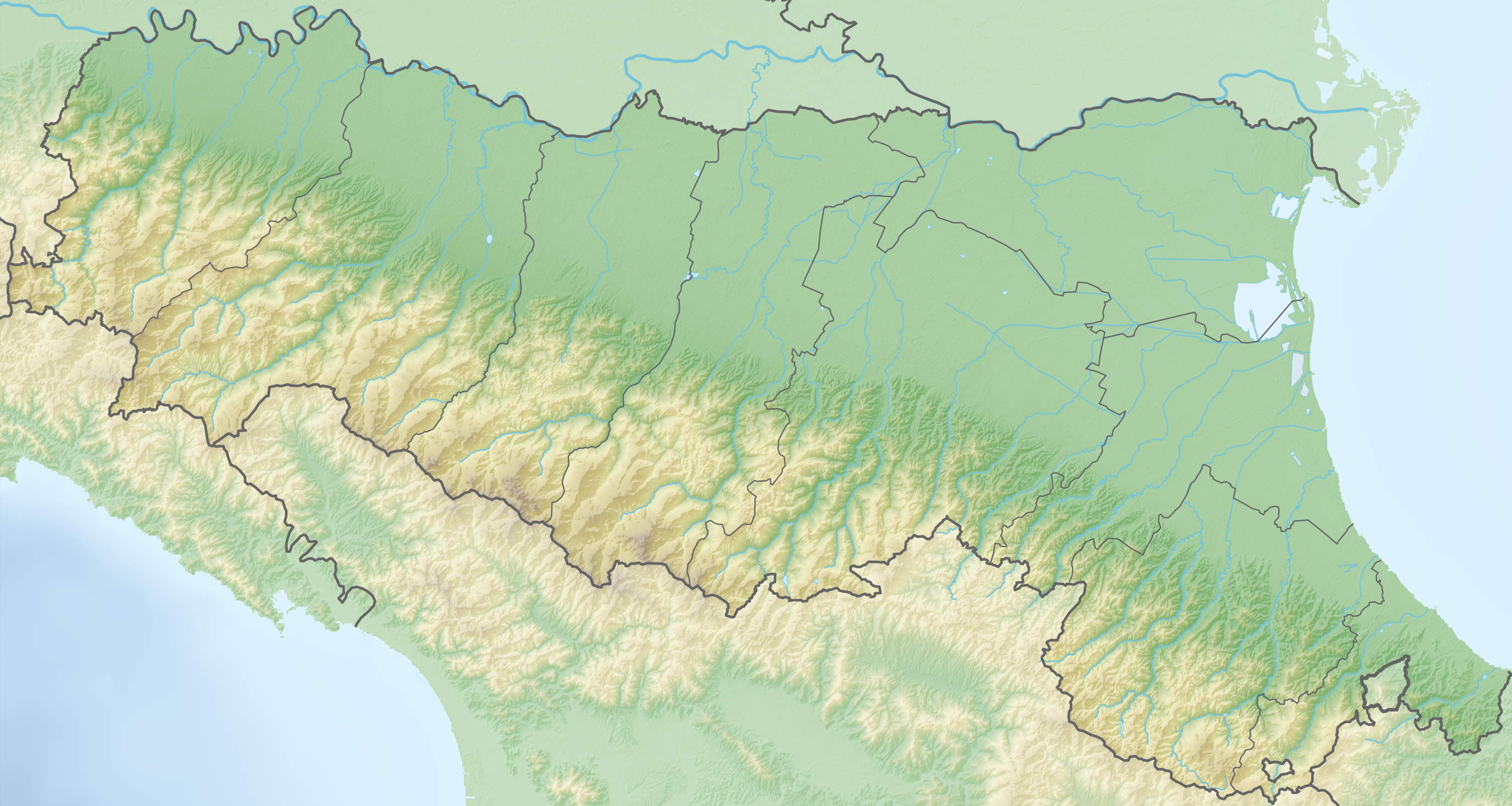
- Location within Emilia-Romagna
- Location: Province of Modena, Emilia-Romagna
- Coordinates: 44.120497°N 10.599307°E
- Basin countries: Italy
- Surface area: 3,125 m^{2} (33,640 sq ft)
- Surface elevation: 1,600 m (5,200 ft)

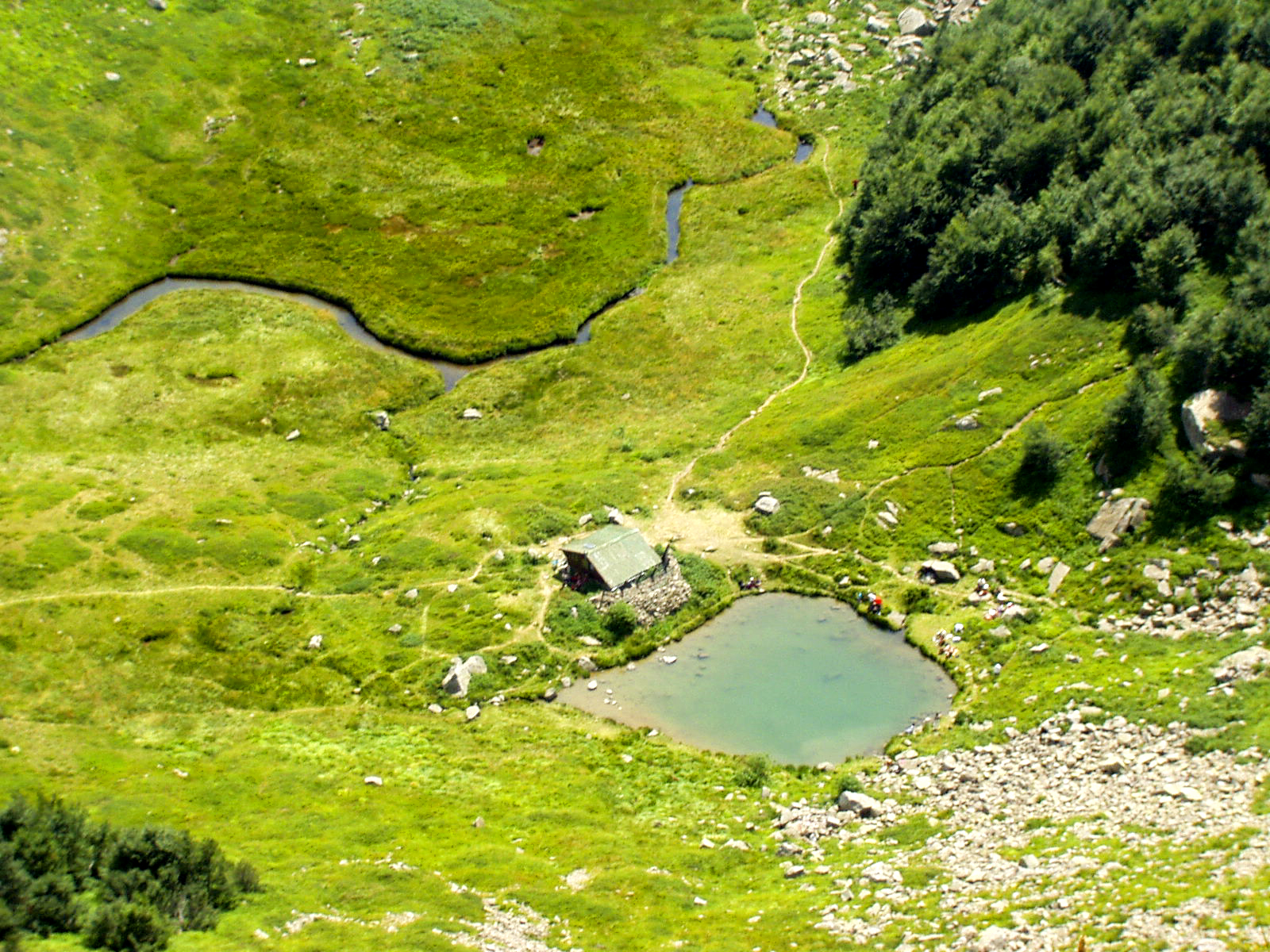
Turchino Lake

Turchino Lake is a lake in the Province of Modena, Emilia-Romagna, Italy. At an elevation of 1600 m, its surface area is 3125 m^{2}.
