= Turczyn =

Turczyn may refer to the following places:

- Turczyn, Gmina Choroszcz (eastern Poland)
- Turczyn, Grajewo County (north eastern Poland)
