= Radom, Illinois =

Radom
- Village
- Location of Radom in Washington County, Illinois.
- Coordinates: 38°16′47″N 89°11′32″W
- Country: United States
- State: Illinois
- County: Washington

Government
  - Type: Mayor–council government

Area
  - Total: 1.05 sq mi (2.72 km^{2})
  - Land: 1.05 sq mi (2.72 km^{2})
  - Water: 0 sq mi (0.00 km^{2})
- Elevation: 532 ft (162 m)

Population (2020)
  - Total: 183
  - Density: 175/sq mi (67.4/km^{2})
- Time zone: UTC-6 (CST)
  - Summer (DST): UTC-5 (CDT)
- ZIP code: 62876
- Area code: 618
- FIPS code: 17-62523
- GNIS ID: 2399035

Radom is a village in Washington County, Illinois, United States. As of the 2020 census, Radom had a population of 183.

== History ==
Radom was originally settled chiefly by Poles. The city takes its name after Radom, in Poland. John B. Turchin, a former Colonel in the Imperial Russian Army and in the Union Army during the American Civil War, was instrumental in the community's foundation.

== Geography ==
According to the 2010 census, Radom has a total area of 1.04 square miles (2.69 km^{2}), all land.

== Demographics ==
Historical population
Census	Pop.	Note	%±
1940	102		—
1950	134		31.4%
1960	137		2.2%
1970	172		25.5%
1980	174		1.2%
1990	174		0.0%
2000	395		127.0%
2010	220		−44.3%
2020	183		−16.8%
U.S. Decennial Census

As of the census of 2000, there were 395 people, 86 households, and 58 families residing in the village. The population density was 381.0 inhabitants per square mile (147.1/km^{2}). There were 100 housing units at an average density of 96.4 per square mile (37.2/km^{2}). The racial makeup of the village was 97.72% White, 1.77% African American, 0.25% from other races, and 0.25% from two or more races. Hispanic or Latino of any race were 0.76% of the population.

There were 86 households, out of which 36.0% had children under the age of 18 living with them, 58.1% were married couples living together, 9.3% had a female householder with no husband present, and 31.4% were non-families. 29.1% of all households were made up of individuals, and 22.1% had someone living alone who was 65 years of age or older. The average household size was 2.58 and the average family size was 3.19.

In the village, the population was spread out, with 16.2% under the age of 18, 2.3% from 18 to 24, 18.2% from 25 to 44, 13.2% from 45 to 64, and 50.1% who were 65 years of age or older. The median age was 65 years. For every 100 females, there were 77.9 males. For every 100 females age 18 and over, there were 68.9 males.

The median income for a household in the village was $30,000, and the median income for a family was $44,375. Males had a median income of $36,250 versus $25,000 for females. The per capita income for the village was $13,882. About 5.8% of families and 8.3% of the population were below the poverty line, including 2.9% of those under age 18 and 16.0% of those age 65 or over.

== See also ==
- Radom (disambiguation)
