= John B. Turchin =

Russian-born US Army Civil War general (1822–1901)

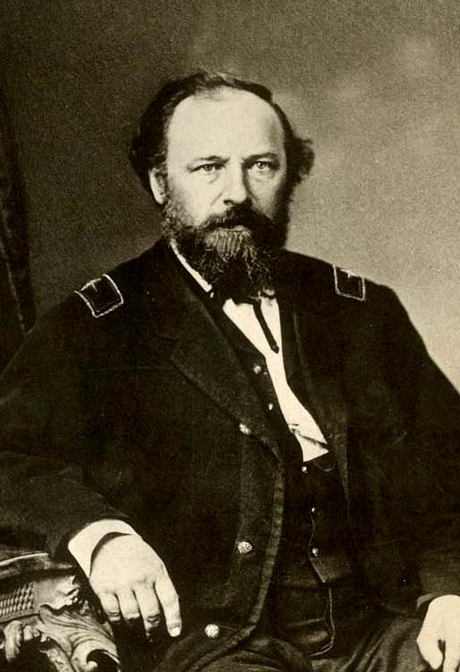
- Turchin in 1867
- Born: Ivan Vasilyevich Turchaninov; January 30, 1822; Don Host Oblast, Russian Empire
- Died: June 18, 1901 (aged 79); Anna, Illinois, U.S.
- Burial place: Mound City National Cemetery
- Spouse: Nadezhda Lvov
- Military career
- Allegiance: Russia; United States
- Branch: Imperial Russian Army; United States Army; Union Army
- Service years: 1843–1856 (Imperial Russian Army); 1861–1864 (U.S. Army)
- Rank: Colonel (Imperial Russian Army); Brigadier General (U.S. Army)
- Nickname: "Russian Thunderbolt"
- Conflicts: Hungarian Revolution of 1848; Crimean War; American Civil War; Battle of Chickamauga; Battle of Missionary Ridge; Atlanta campaign

Signature
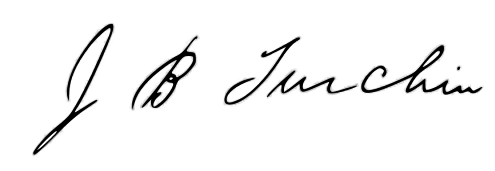

Ivan Vasilyevich Turchaninov (Russian: Иван Васильевич Турчанинов; December 24, 1822 – June 18, 1901), better known by his anglicized name of John Basil Turchin, was a member of the Russian nobility, a military-intelligence Colonel in the Imperial Russian Army, and a personal staff-officer to the future Emperor Alexander II of Russia. He immigrated to the United States in 1856, and after working as a farmer in Long Island and as a railroad official in Chicago, he voluntarily returned to military service in 1861, becoming a Union Army Colonel during the American Civil War.

Turchin was court-martialed for allowing the 19th Illinois Infantry Regiment to unleash total war in the 1862 "Sack of Athens" in retaliation for Alabama civilians firing upon his troops during their earlier retreat from the town. The court-martial found him guilty of all charges and sentenced him to a dishonorable discharge. After listening to the strong urging of Madame Turchin to reinstate her husband (and almost certainly influenced even more so by the court-martial judges' signed request for a reversal of the verdict and sentence), President Abraham Lincoln promoted Turchin to brigadier general on 17 June 1862. This immediately invalidated the court-martial and its verdict, as an officer could only be tried before judges of equal or greater rank.

After his reinstatement, Turchin led two critical charges that saved Union forces at the Battle of Chickamauga in September 1863, for which he received the nickname "The Russian Thunderbolt". He was later one of the first Union commanders to lead his soldiers to the top of Missionary Ridge in November 1863. He was also praised in dispatches as he served under the command of Absalom Baird and William Tecumseh Sherman during the 1864 Atlanta campaign. He resigned from the United States Army in October 1864 due to ill health and returned to Illinois, where he became a leader within the Grand Army of the Republic.

== Early life and career ==
Ivan Turchin was born on December 24, 1822, or January 30, 1822, into the Don Cossack Turchaninov family of the nobility of the Russian Empire. He entered the Imperial Russian Army in 1843, and graduated from the Imperial Military Academy in St. Petersburg in 1852. His father was a Major in the Imperial Russian Army, which gained him entry into schools that led to his eventual military commission. While serving as a lieutenant, he took part in the Russian campaign to help Emperor Franz Joseph defeat the Hungarian Revolution of 1848. He later served as a Colonel of Staff in the Imperial Guard and fought in the Crimean War.

Following his graduation, Turchin was posted to the staff of Imperial Guards in St. Petersburg, under the command of Count F.V. Rudiger. He was promoted to the rank of Colonel and even served on the personal staff of Tsarevich Alexander Nikolaevich.

His military career in Russia, according to Thomas Lowry, was spent in the "État Major", an early military intelligence wing of the Imperial Russian Army, "that collected and prepared maps, interrogated citizens, and made lists of supplies, roads, and bridges". During his 1862 court-martial, Turchin complained that the United States Army had as yet no equivalent to the "État Major" and that he was accordingly, "forced to do such staff work himself, which left him little time to attend to peripheral matters".

In May 1856, he married Nadezhda Lvova, the daughter of his commanding officer. Later that year, he and his wife emigrated to the United States, where he eventually settled in Chicago and worked for the Illinois Central Railroad. He Americanised his name to John Basil Turchin and his wife did the same, adopting the name Nadine Turchin.

The Turchins' reasons for emigration to the United States remain uncertain, but are believed by some scholars to have been connected to a secret belief in liberal democracy and representative government and possibly also, given his later policy of protecting runaway slaves during the American Civil War, to a likely hostility to serfdom in Russia. If so, these would not have been acceptable positions, particularly following the Decembrist revolt, for any Russian subject, no matter what their place in the class system, to hold during the reign of Tsar Nicholas I of Russia.

In a letter following his emigration, Turchin wrote:

I thank America for one thing, it helped me get rid of my aristocratic prejudices, and it reduced me to the rank of a mere mortal. I have been reborn. I fear no work; no sphere of business scares me away, and no social position will put me down; it makes no difference whether I plow and cart manure or sit in a richly decorated room and discuss astronomy with the great scholars of the New World. I want to earn the right to call myself a citizen of the United States of America.

== Civil War ==
Turchin joined the Union army at the outbreak of the war in 1861 and became the colonel of the 19th Illinois Volunteer Infantry Regiment.

Historian Thomas Lowry has written of Turchin, "He used European methods of discipline with his troops, which soon produced an efficient and tightly run fighting unit. It was also a unit that followed the European tradition in that to victors belong the spoils - the losers could expect pillage and plunder."

Turchin wrote on July 30, 1862, "The more lenient we are to secessionists, the bolder they become and if we do not prosecute this war with vigor, using all the means we possess against the enemy, including the emancipation of the slaves, the ruin of the country is inevitable. The problem before us is grand. Universal freedom is at stake."

Having led his regiment in Missouri and Kentucky, he soon found his unit under the command of Major General Don Carlos Buell in the newly organized Army of the Ohio. Buell was impressed by Turchin and promoted him to command a brigade in the Army of the Ohio's Third Division, commanded by Brigadier General Ormsby M. Mitchel. Buell advanced southward into Kentucky and Tennessee in early 1862.

When Buell headed west to support Grant at the Battle of Shiloh, he left Mitchel to hold Nashville. Turchin urged Mitchel to move southward. Mitchel did so, but not because of Turchin. He took Huntsville, Alabama, as part of a plan with the spy James J. Andrews to capture Chattanooga by cutting it off from Confederate reinforcements. Mitchel blocked them from the west by capturing Huntsville. Andrews was to block them from the south by burning bridges on the Western and Atlantic line. Unfortunately, Andrews failed; after the Great Locomotive Chase, all the raiders were captured, and some, including Andrews, were executed. Nonetheless, Mitchell continued to occupy the line westward from Chattanooga throughout much of northern Alabama.

The occupation of northern Alabama by this division of the Union Army led to attack by combined partisan and Confederate cavalry units. One such attack overran one of Turchin's regiments at Athens, Alabama. Frustration had been building among these Union soldiers for weeks over repeated attacks and Buell's clearly stated conciliatory policy of protecting the rights and property of Southerners. The reported involvement of local citizens in the rout at Athens and the humiliation suffered by the Union soldiers led to the sacking of the town when Turchin brought up reinforcements. According to University of New Mexico School of Law professor Joshua E. Kastenberg, Southern civilians had fired on Turchin's men. General Joseph Keifer, who served as an ad hoc judge advocate, stated "Turchin did not believe that war could be successfully waged by an invading army with its officers and soldiers acting as missionaries of mercy."

After reoccupying the town on May 2, 1862, Turchin assembled his men and reportedly told them, "I shut my eyes for two hours. I see nothing." He did in fact leave the town to reconnoiter defensive positions, during which time his men ransacked the business district. The incident was controversial.

When word reached General Buell, a man much detested by the soldiers, he insisted on court-martialing Turchin. The court proceedings received national attention and became a focal point for the debate on the conduct of the war, related to the conciliatory policy as Union casualties in the war mounted.

On February 25, 1862, Buell had issued a general order commanding his soldier "to protect the dignity of civilians". As Professor Kastenberg has noted, while Turchin may not have been concerned with the law or war, he certainly was "on notice" of Buell's order. Turchin, according to Kastenberg, had another problem at his court-martial. He requested Colonel Carter Gazlay to serve as his defense counsel, which was unusual since defense counsel was not a right at the time, and Gazlay faced his own court-martial for theft of army property. Also, as Kastenberg points out, Brigadier General James Garfield wrote to Secretary of War Edwin Stanton, "I cannot sufficiently give utterance to my horror of the ravages, outrages, that have been committed... this town was, by Col Turchin, given up to pillage." Turchin was ultimately spared an ignominious end because Buell was removed from command for his incompetence.

There were three charges against Turchin. He was first accused of "neglect of duty". According to the recitations, there were over twenty or so instances in which Turchin supposedly ordered his soldiers to pillage and plunder Athens, Alabama, without any proper restraints to them. Such instances included the sexual abuse of a servant [meaning a slave] girl, telling male slaves that they were now free men causing them to allegedly join in the rioting, and the utter decimation of Bibles and testaments, which were destroyed and burned to pieces in a shop. Many of the other allegations against included the plundering of ten stores and nine homes. "The rape served as the ultimate example of Turchin's failure" to control his own troops. Under the second charge, Turchin failed to conduct himself in a manner expected of an officer and a gentleman. That mattered to General Buell because under "Article 83 conviction meant automatic dismissal from the service and the end of Turchin's military career." A specification added to this charge included a failure to pay the bill at a hotel. The third charge was a failure to obey orders. It was believed that if Turchin were convicted on that charge, it would send a clear message to the officers in the Army of the Ohio and instill discipline and order within the ranks of the army. When the court-martial began, Garfield had been under the impression that Turchin allowed the things that took place at Athens in accordance with Muscovite custom.

According to Thomas Lowry, "At the trial, Turchin not only pled innocent, but demanded that the secessionist witnesses against him take the Oath of Allegiance, arguing that the Athenians were trying to have it both ways: treason towards the United States while invoking the protection of the laws of the United States. The court declined to honor his request."

Historian Thomas Lowry has written of Turchin, "What is clear from his thirty-three page defense statement is his Old World view of warfare. Rather than the courtly fictions of Sir Walter Scott, with their intimations of chivalry and gracious treatment of professed non-combatants, Turchin's eye viewed the civilian secessionists as traitors, grist for the mills of more hardheaded conquerors such as Genghis Khan, Tamerlane, and Ivan the Terrible. His view might be summarized as: 'If you don't like war, don't start one.' In this, he prefigured the campaigns of William T. Sherman against the Southern economy and the assaults on national will seen in the bombings of London, Dresden, and Hiroshima. Whether Turchin was cruel, of merely pragmatic, is a task for the philosophers of history. It is obvious that Turchin had little use for Victorian sentimentality towards the vanquished Rebels, who fired on his troops and then retreated to the sanctuary of their parlors to complain of soiled carpets."

Turchin was found guilty of dereliction of duty, conduct unbecoming an officer, and disobeying orders. The court sentenced him to a dishonorable discharge from the United States Army, but the judges, who clearly thought that Turchin was far too valuable of a fighting commander to be permanently sidelined during wartime, all signed a statement requesting that their superiors overturn the verdict. They stated, "The undersigned members of General-Court-Martial before which was tried Colonel J.B. Turchin, respectfully submit that in view of the fact that the finding of the Court acquits Colonel Turchin of any personal dishonor, and believing that his offenses were committed under exciting circumstances and was one of omission rather than commission, we would respectfully recommend him to the favorable consideration of the Reviewing Officer."

Gen. Buell instead confirmed the verdict and ordered Turchin be dismissed from the army. However, Madame Turchin, a deeply formidable woman of great determination and courtly charm, travelled to Washington on her husband's behalf. She obtained audiences with Secretary of War Edwin Stanton and President Lincoln to recommend her husband's reinstatement, with the result that President Abraham Lincoln promoted Turchin in mid-July to brigadier general. This invalidated both the court-martial and sentence: an officer could only be tried by those of equal or greater rank, and Turchin now outranked six of the seven members of the court. On August 8, 1862, the Chicago Times accordingly wrote, "truly in the lottery matrimonial Col. Turchin had the good fortune to draft an invaluable prize." Gen. Turchin received a hero's welcome upon his return to Chicago. Prominent figures called for the removal of Buell and a more aggressive conduct of the war to bring it to a swift end.

Turchin was given command of a new brigade in 1863. He distinguished himself during the battles of Chickamauga, for which he dubbed, "the Russian Thunderbolt", and Chattanooga, and in the Atlanta campaign, during which his commanding officer, Absalom Baird, praised Turchin's, "soldiery and patriotic" performance.

Turchin's wife, known in the army as Madame Turchin, always stood by him and followed her husband on the field during his campaigns, witnessing the battles (as at Chickamauga and at the Battle of Missionary Ridge), and writing the only woman's war diary of the military campaigns.

Turchin resigned from service in October 1864 after being diagnosed with heatstroke on the campaign.

== Post-war life and legacy ==
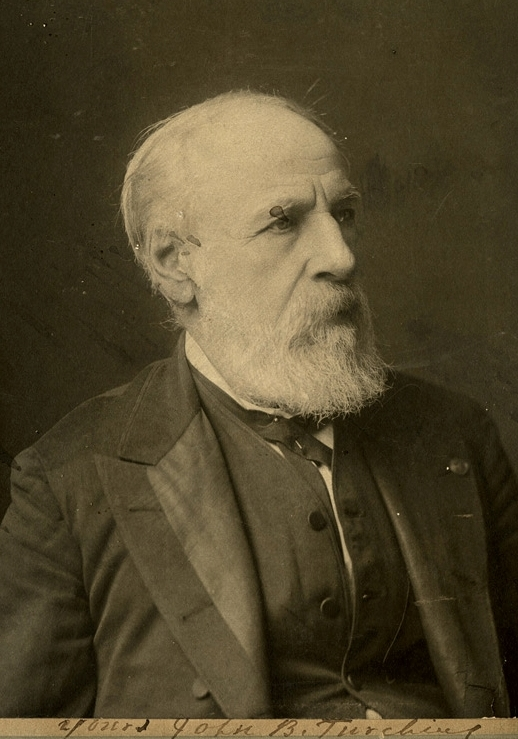
Turchin in his later years

Turchin returned to Chicago, where he wrote and published two editions of his memoirs Military Rambles. He became a prominent figure in the Grand Army of the Republic and worked between 1865 and 1872 as a patent solicitor and civil engineer. In 1873, he helped fellow émigrés from Tsarism to found the Polish-American colony in Radom, Illinois. His 295-page study of Chickamauga was published in 1888.

In 1895, Turchin produced a pamphlet as part of an ongoing lawsuit, denouncing the design of the Chickamauga and Chattanooga National Military Park, for allegedly favoring the Pro-Confederate Myth of the Lost Cause and insulting the sacrifices and memory of the Union soldiers who also fell during the Chickamauga Campaign.

In 1900, he was awarded a pension under a private pension act approved by Congress. He suffered senile dementia and died penniless in the Southern Illinois Hospital for the Insane at Anna, Illinois, at the age of 79. He lies buried beside Madame Turchin at the Mound City National Cemetery in Pulaski County, Illinois.

== Legacy ==
Even though his orders were issued in retaliation for illegal civilian warfare against his troops, John Turchin has long been portrayed by Neo-Confederates and other adherents of the Myth of the Lost Cause as an irredeemably villainous figure for the so-called "Rape of Athens," and Lincoln has traditionally been reviled in the same circles for reversing his court-martial verdict.

Turchin's actions at Athens, though, presaged those that other Union commanders, particularly William Tecumseh Sherman, would adopt in prosecuting total war against the Confederate States. They also presaged many of the equally and sometimes even more severe total war tactics, like the Fort Pillow massacre, later adopted by the Confederacy. Particularly after President Jefferson Davis issued verbal orders in 1864 to Captain Thomas Hines to recruit Northern Copperheads en masse into the Northwest Conspiracy; the covert efforts of Order of the Sons of Liberty leader Harrison H. Dodd to launch regime change uprisings against the pro-Union governors of Ohio, Iowa, Minnesota, Kentucky, Indiana, and Illinois in order to bring those States into the Confederacy.

Davis' authorisation for total war also resulted in the Charleston Riot, the conspiracy to burn down New York City, the St Albans, Vermont bank robbery and arson attack, the conspiracy to commit piracy on the Great Lakes masterminded by John Yates Beall, and many other similarly ungentlemanly acts of warfare to be unleashed behind Union lines.

== In popular culture ==
- The Union Army song "Turchin's got your mule" (stemming both from the catchphrase "Here's your mule" and referring to Gen. Turchin's policy of refusing to return runaway slaves who fled to his unit to their former masters) was popular during the war, and its chorus is said to have been sung by retreating Confederate soldiers as a way to mock General Braxton Bragg's efforts to rally them during the Battle of Missionary Ridge.

== See also ==
- List of American Civil War generals (Union)
