= Yaryna Turchyn =

Ukrainian politician (born 1975)

- Ярина Богданівна Турчин
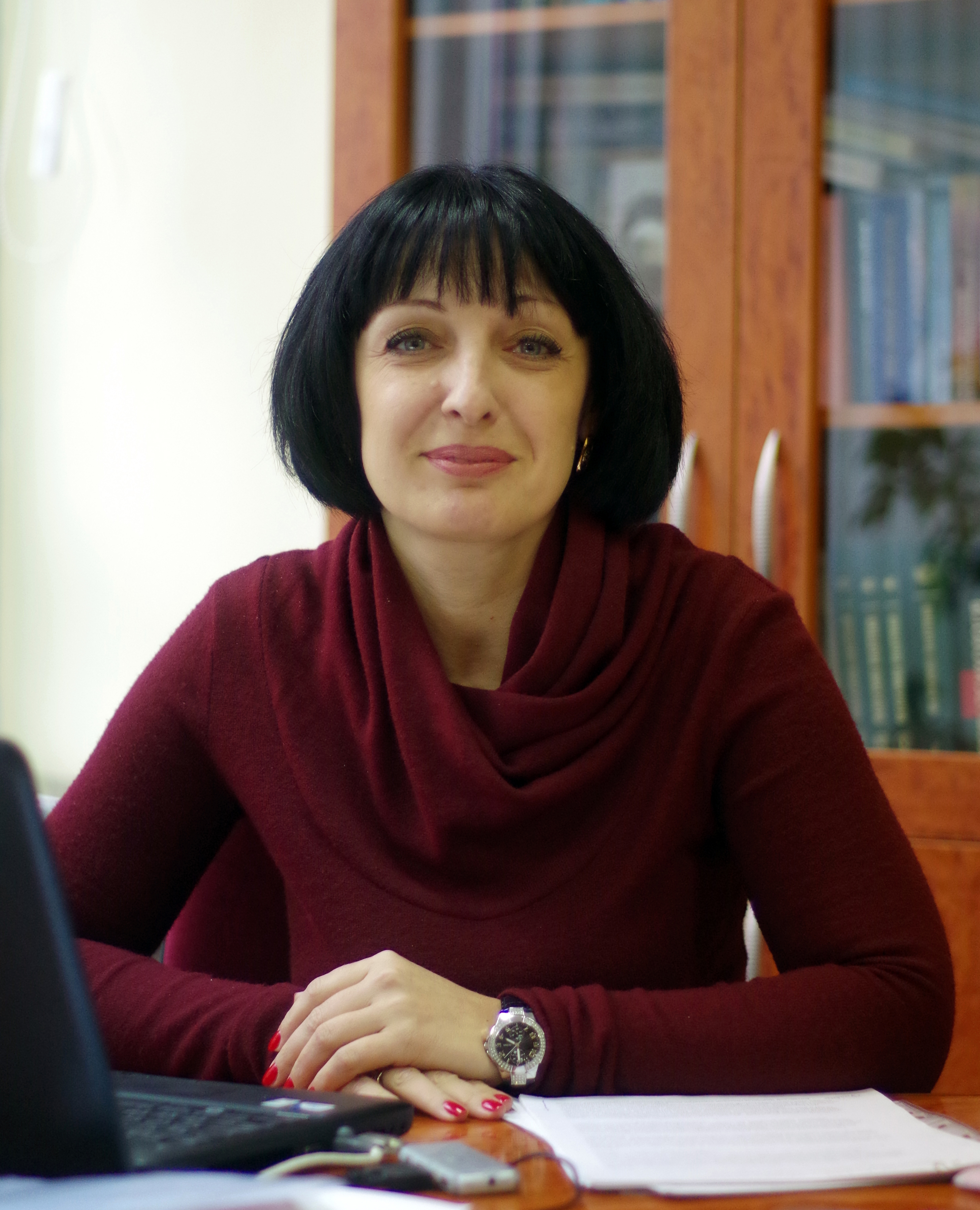
- Turchyn Yaryna

Personal details
- Born: October 22, 1975 Lviv
- Citizenship: Ukraine
- Education: Ternopil State Pedagogical Institute
- Occupation: Doctor of Political Sciences, Professor
- Awards: The Certificate of Honor for excellent teaching and scientific achievements and outstanding service to Lviv Polytechnic (2009); The University Badge of Honor for considerable scientific achievements (2012); The Acknowledgement from the Ministry of Education and Science of Ukraine for many years of dedicated work, significant contribution in training high-quality specialists and fruitful teaching and scientific work (2014)

Yaryna Bohdanivna Turchyn (Ukrainian: Турчин Ярина Богданівна, born October 22, 1975 in Lviv) is a director of the Institute of Humanities and Social Studies of Lviv Polytechnic National University, Doctor of Political Sciences, Professor.

== Biography ==
Yaryna Turchyn graduated from Ternopil State Pedagogical Institute in 1997. During 2000–2004 she took postgraduate courses at Lviv Polytechnic.

Turchyn has been working at Lviv Polytechnic National University since 2004. She headed the Department of Political Science in the period of 2007–2014. From December 2014 holds the position of Director of the Institute of Humanities and Social Studies.

== Scientific activities ==
In 2005, she defended the Candidate thesis "Socio-Political Views and Ideals of State Building of S. Shelukhin". In 2011, she defended the Doctor thesis on "Ideals of State Building of O. Eikhelman: Evolution of the Institutional Dimensions of Policy" in specialty 23.00.01 – Theory and History of Political Science.

Turchyn's scientific contribution comprises 160 works in Political Science, among them more than 20 training manuals and dictionaries, 2 monographs, 30 teaching handbooks, 110 scientific publications, 54 of them being scientific articles.

In 2012, she won the competition among the authors of monographs, textbooks and manuals in the category "The Best Monograph" and was awarded with the First Degree Diploma of Lviv Polytechnic National University.

Turchyn participated in 60 international and all-Ukrainian scientific and practical conferences, departmental and interdepartmental scientific seminars (workshops).

Turchyn has several times been involved into organization and work of Ecumenical social weeklies in Lviv; in particular, in 2012 she was awarded with Acknowledgement from the Secretariat of Ecumenical Social weeklies of Ukraine for her help in organizing and conducting the Fifth Ecumenical social weekly "Future of Democracy in Ukraine".

Since 2009 Turchyn has been supervising the department's research direction "Problems and Prospects of Developing Democracy in Ukraine" and since 2013 under her scientific guidance the department is doing research in "Political Aspects of State Development: Internal and External Dimensions". She is a scientific advisor of some postgraduates.

Turchyn is a member of Specialized Academic Board D. 35.051.17 at Ivan Franko Lviv National University. She is a member of Editorial Boards of three scientific journals:

- "Ukrainian National Idea: Realities and Prospects of Development" (Lviv Polytechnic National University);
- Philosophic Bulletin (Lviv Polytechnic National University);
- "Philosophic and Political Studies" (Ivan Franko LNU).

Also, Turchyn heads the Editorial Board of the journal “Humanitarian Visions”. Turchyn supervises the work of the VECTOR scientific analytical center of political research at Lviv Polytechnic National University.

Turchyn is a member of The Academic Board of Lviv Polytechnic National University, heads the Academic Board of the Institute of Humanities and Social Studies, is a member of the Attestation Commission of Lviv Polytechnic National University Academic Board.

== Social activities ==
Yaryna Turchyn is a member of Shevchenko Prosvita Society Council at Lviv Polytechnic National University.

== Awards and honours ==
Turchyn was awarded with:

- Certificate of Honor of Lviv Polytechnic National University for excellent teaching and scientific achievements and outstanding service to Lviv Polytechnic (2009);
- University Badge of Honor for considerable scientific achievements (2012);
- First Degree Diploma of Lviv Polytechnic National University (2012);
- Acknowledgment from the Ministry of Education and Science of Ukraine for many years of dedicated work, significant contribution in training high-quality specialists and fruitful teaching and scientific work (2014).
