= Benjamin White House =

Benjamin White House may refer to:

- Benjamin White House (Milton, Delaware), listed on the National Register of Historic Places in Sussex County, Delaware
- Benjamin White House (Brookline, Massachusetts), listed on the National Register of Historic Places in Norfolk County, Massachusetts
