= Charles Heath (disambiguation) =

Charles Heath (1785–1848) was an English engraver.

Charles Heath may also refer to:

- Charles Heath (Monmouth) (1761–1831), British printer, writer and radical
- Charles H. Heath (1829–1889), Vermont politician and attorney
- Charles Heath (British Army officer) (1854–1936)

== See also ==
- Charles Heath House, Brookline, Massachusetts
