= House at 25 Stanton Road =

Historic house in Massachusetts, United States

- U.S. National Register of Historic Places
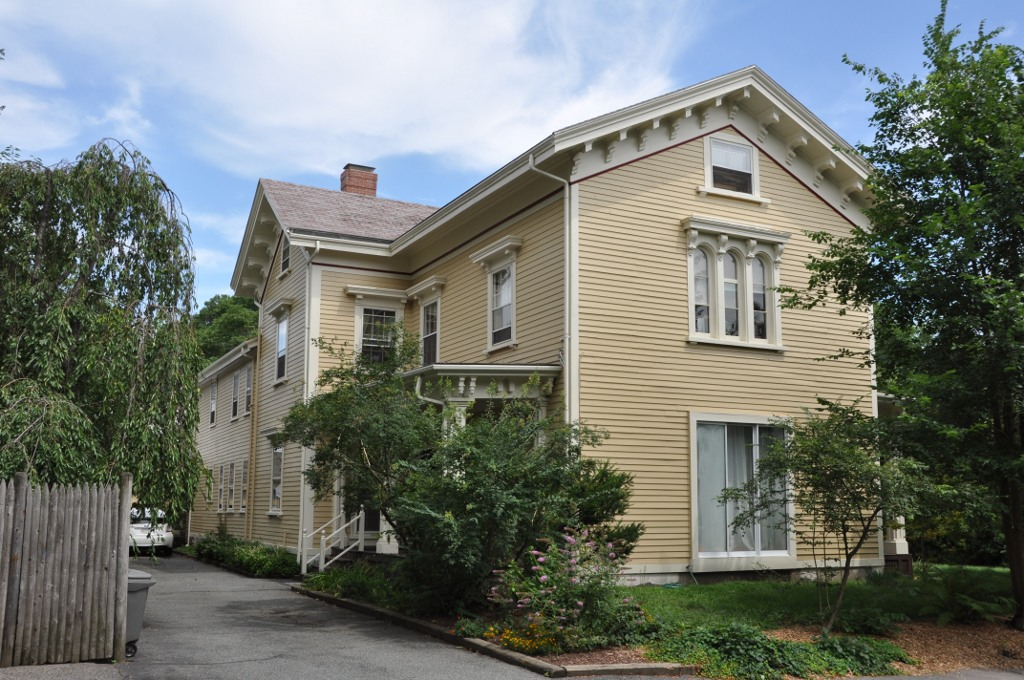

- Location within Massachusetts Location within the United States
- Location: 25 Stanton Road, Brookline, Massachusetts
- Coordinates: 42°20′3″N 71°7′31″W
- Architectural style: Italianate
- MPS: Brookline MRA
- NRHP reference No.: 85003285
- Added to NRHP: October 17, 1985

25 Stanton Road is a historic house located in Brookline, Massachusetts, and is a well-preserved local example of Italianate design.

== Description and history ==
The 2 1/2-story wood-frame house was built c. 1849–1855, probably by Samuel Crafts, who also built a number of other Italianate houses nearby. The L-shaped building has deep eaves with paired brackets, and a distinctive three-part window on the second floor below one of the gables. A heavily bracketed porch in the crook of the L shelters the front entry.

The house was listed on the National Register of Historic Places on October 17, 1985.

== See also ==
- House at 5 Lincoln Road, another Crafts house
- House at 44 Stanton Road, another Italianate house
- National Register of Historic Places listings in Brookline, Massachusetts
