= Penniman =

Penniman is a surname. Notable people with the surname include:

- Ebenezer J. Penniman (1804–1890), politician from the U.S. state of Michigan
- John Ritto Penniman (1782–1841), painter in Boston, Massachusetts, USA
- Nick Penniman, the president of the Democracy Fund
- Richard Wayne Penniman, stage name Little Richard
- Samuel Penniman Bates (1827–1902), American educator, author, and historian

== See also ==
- Edward Penniman House and Barn, historic site in Eastham, Massachusetts
- House at 83 Penniman Place, historic house at 83 Penniman Place in Brookline, Massachusetts
- Penniman, Virginia, unincorporated town in northwestern York County in the United States
