= National Register of Historic Places listings in Brookline, Massachusetts =

This is a list of properties on the National Register of Historic Places in Brookline, Massachusetts.

This National Park Service list is complete through NPS recent listings posted November 13, 2026.

== Current listings ==
	Name on the Register	Image	Date listed	Location	Neighborhood	Description
1	1767 Milestones	1767 Milestones	April 7, 1971 (#71000084)	Between Boston and Springfield along Old Post Rd. 42°20′25″N 71°07′15″W	Coolidge Corner	Includes markers in Suffolk, Middlesex, Worcester, and Hampden counties. Only one marker is located in Brookline.
2	Larz Anderson Park Historic District	Larz Anderson Park Historic District	October 17, 1985 (#85003245)	Bounded by Goddard and Avon Sts. 42°18′43″N 71°08′10″W	Larz Anderson Park	Extends into Boston in Suffolk County
3	Arcade Building	Arcade Building	October 17, 1985 (#85003247)	314–320A Harvard St. 42°20′35″N 71°07′26″W	Coolidge Corner	
4	Beacon Street Historic District	Beacon Street Historic District	October 17, 1985 (#85003322)	Roughly on Beacon St. from Saint Mary's to Ayr Rd. 42°20′23″N 71°07′56″W	Coolidge Corner, Washington Square, Cleveland Circle	
5	Beaconsfield Terraces Historic District	Beaconsfield Terraces Historic District	October 17, 1985 (#85003248)	11–25, 33–43, and 44–55 Garrison Rd. and 316–326, 332–344, and 350–366 Tappan St. 42°20′15″N 71°08′18″W	Beaconsfield	
6	William Ingersoll Bowditch House	William Ingersoll Bowditch House	October 17, 1985 (#85003249)	9 Toxteth St. 42°20′08″N 71°07′01″W	Brookline Village	
7	Brandegee Estate	Brandegee Estate	October 17, 1985 (#85003244)	280 Newton St. 42°18′28″N 71°08′46″W	South Brookline	Extends into Boston in Suffolk County
8	Brookline Town Green Historic District	Brookline Town Green Historic District	June 22, 1980 (#80000650)	Chestnut Pl., Fairmont, Dudley, Boylston, Walnut and Warren Sts., Hedge, Codman, and Kennard Rds. 42°19′36″N 71°07′53″W	Chestnut Hill	
9	Brookline Village Commercial District	Brookline Village Commercial District	May 22, 1979 (#79000364)	Irregular Pattern along Washington St. 42°20′00″N 71°07′16″W	Brookline Village	
10	Building at 30–34 Station Street	Building at 30–34 Station Street	October 17, 1985 (#85003250)	30–34 Station St. 42°19′59″N 71°07′01″W	Brookline Village	
11	Lewis Cabot Estate	Lewis Cabot Estate	October 17, 1985 (#85003251)	514 Warren St. 42°19′21″N 71°08′35″W	Brookline	Demolished.
12	Candler Cottage	Candler Cottage	October 17, 1985 (#85003252)	447 Washington St. 42°20′08″N 71°07′31″W	Coolidge Corner	
13	Chestnut Hill Historic District	Chestnut Hill Historic District	October 17, 1985 (#85003253)	Roughly bounded by Middlesex Rd., Reservoir Ln., Denny Rd., Boylston St. and Dunster Rd. 42°19′36″N 71°09′32″W	Chestnut Hill	Overlaps slightly into Newton
14	Isaac Child House	Isaac Child House	October 17, 1985 (#85003254)	209 Newton St. 42°18′38″N 71°08′38″W	South Brookline	
15	Timothy Corey House No. 1	Timothy Corey House No. 1	October 17, 1985 (#85003255)	808 Washington St. 42°20′29″N 71°08′22″W	Corey Farm	
16	Timothy Corey House No. 2	Timothy Corey House No. 2	October 17, 1985 (#85003256)	786–788 Washington St. 42°20′29″N 71°08′21″W	Corey Farm	
17	Cottage Farm Historic District	Cottage Farm Historic District	March 29, 1978 (#78000455)	Roughly bounded by Amory, Dummer, Lenox, Brookline and Beacon Sts. 42°20′51″N 71°06′44″W	Cottage Farm	
18	Cypress-Emerson Historic District	Cypress-Emerson Historic District	October 17, 1985 (#85003257)	Roughly bounded by Waverly, Emerson, and Cypress Sts. 42°19′58″N 71°07′21″W	Emerson Garden	
19	Robert S. Davis House	Robert S. Davis House	October 17, 1985 (#85003259)	50 Stanton Rd. 42°20′03″N 71°07′37″W	Brookline Hills	
20	Thomas Aspinwall Davis House	Thomas Aspinwall Davis House	October 17, 1985 (#85003260)	29 Linden Pl. 42°20′06″N 71°07′02″W	Brookline Village	
21	Edward Devotion House	Edward Devotion House	February 14, 1978 (#78002835)	347 Harvard St. 42°20′39″N 71°07′29″W	Coolidge Corner	
22	Alfred Douglass House	Alfred Douglass House	October 17, 1985 (#85003261)	76 Fernwood Rd. 42°18′41″N 71°08′33″W	Buttonwood Village	Demolished. Listing address is 157 Clyde St.
23	The Dutch House	The Dutch House	January 24, 1986 (#86000093)	20 Netherlands Rd. 42°20′09″N 71°06′45″W	Brookline Village	
24	Gen. Simon Elliot House	Gen. Simon Elliot House	October 17, 1985 (#85003262)	61 Heath St. 42°19′29″N 71°08′42″W	Woodland-Heath	
25	Emmett Cottage	Emmett Cottage	October 17, 1985 (#85003263)	217 Freeman St. 42°20′52″N 71°07′13″W	Brookline	
26	Fernwood	Fernwood	October 17, 1985 (#85003264)	155 Clyde St. 42°19′14″N 71°08′50″W	Buttonwood Village	
27	Fire Station No. 7	Fire Station No. 7	October 17, 1985 (#85003265)	665 Washington St. 42°20′19″N 71°08′02″W	Washington Square	
28	Fisher Hill Historic District	Fisher Hill Historic District	October 17, 1985 (#85003266)	Roughly bounded by Clinton and Sumner Rds., Boylston St. and Chestnut Hill Ave. 42°19′52″N 71°08′29″W	Fisher Hill	
29	Fisher Hill Reservoir and Gatehouse	Fisher Hill Reservoir and Gatehouse	January 18, 1990 (#89002254)	Fisher Rd. between Hyslop and Channing Rds. 42°19′45″N 71°08′37″W	Fisher Hill	
30	Dr. Tappan Eustis Francis House	Dr. Tappan Eustis Francis House	October 17, 1985 (#85003267)	35 Davis Ave. 42°19′57″N 71°07′14″W	Emerson Garden	
31	Peter Fuller Building	Peter Fuller Building	October 17, 1985 (#85003269)	808 Commonwealth Ave. 42°21′01″N 71°06′19″W	North Brookline	
32	John Goddard House	John Goddard House	October 17, 1985 (#85003270)	235 Goddard Ave. 42°18′54″N 71°08′11″W	Larz Anderson Park	
33	Graffam Development Historic District	Graffam Development Historic District	October 17, 1985 (#85003271)	Roughly bounded by Abbottsford Rd., Babcock St., Manchester, and Naples Rds. 42°20′56″N 71°07′04″W	Graffam-McKay	
34	Green Hill Historic District	Green Hill Historic District	October 17, 1985 (#85003272)	Roughly Warren St., Sargent Rd., and Cottage St. 42°19′18″N 71°07′59″W	Brookline	
35	Hammond Pond Parkway	Hammond Pond Parkway	March 18, 2004 (#04000250)	Hammond Pond Parkway; 42°19′16″N 71°10′20″W	Chestnut Hill	
36	John Harris House and Farm	John Harris House and Farm	October 17, 1985 (#85003246)	284 Newton St. 42°18′19″N 71°08′36″W	South Brookline	Extends into Boston in Suffolk County
37	Charles Heath House	Charles Heath House	October 17, 1985 (#85003273)	12 Heath Hill; 42°19′33″N 71°08′34″W	Woodland-Heath	
38	Ebenezer Heath House	Ebenezer Heath House	October 17, 1985 (#85003274)	30 Heath St. 42°19′31″N 71°08′36″W	Woodland-Heath	
39	Holyhood Cemetery	Holyhood Cemetery	October 17, 1985 (#85003275)	Heath St. 42°19′12″N 71°10′03″W	Chestnut Hill	
40	Hotel Adelaide	Hotel Adelaide	October 17, 1985 (#85003276)	13–21 High St. 42°19′51″N 71°07′06″W	Pill Hill	
41	Hotel Kempsford	Hotel Kempsford	October 17, 1985 (#85003277)	72 Walnut St. 42°19′50″N 71°07′08″W	Pill Hill	
42	House at 105 Marion Street	House at 105 Marion Street	October 17, 1985 (#85003278)	105 Marion St. 42°19′51″N 71°07′29″W	Coolidge Corner	
43	House at 12 Linden Street	House at 12 Linden Street	October 17, 1985 (#85003279)	12 Linden St. 42°20′04″N 71°07′07″W	Brookline Village	
44	House at 12 Vernon Street	House at 12 Vernon Street	October 17, 1985 (#85003280)	12 Vernon St. 42°20′18″N 71°07′22″W	Coolidge Corner	
45	House at 12–16 Corey Road	House at 12–16 Corey Road	October 17, 1985 (#85003281)	12–16 Corey Rd. 42°20′17″N 71°08′35″W	Corey Farm	
46	House at 155 Reservoir	House at 155 Reservoir	October 17, 1985 (#85003282)	155 Reservoir Rd. 42°19′40″N 71°08′59″W	Pill Hill	
47	House at 156 Mason Terrace	House at 156 Mason Terrace	October 17, 1985 (#85003283)	156 Mason Terr. 42°20′33″N 71°07′47″W	Corey Hill	
48	House at 19 Linden Street	House at 19 Linden Street	October 17, 1985 (#85003284)	19 Linden St. 42°20′03″N 71°07′04″W	Brookline Village	
49	House at 25 Stanton Road	House at 25 Stanton Road	October 17, 1985 (#85003285)	25 Stanton Rd. 42°20′03″N 71°07′31″W	Brookline	
50	House at 38–40 Webster Place	House at 38–40 Webster Place	October 17, 1985 (#85003286)	38–40 Webster Pl. 42°19′59″N 71°06′57″W	Brookline Village	
51	House at 4 Perry Street	House at 4 Perry Street	October 17, 1985 (#85003287)	4 Perry St. 42°20′07″N 71°07′04″W	Brookline Village	
52	House at 44 Linden Street	House at 44 Linden Street	October 17, 1985 (#85003288)	44 Linden St. 42°20′05″N 71°07′02″W	Brookline Village	
53	House at 44 Stanton Road	House at 44 Stanton Road	October 17, 1985 (#85003289)	44 Stanton Rd. 42°20′02″N 71°07′37″W	Brookline Hills	
54	House at 5 Lincoln Road	House at 5 Lincoln Road	October 17, 1985 (#85003290)	5 Lincoln Rd. 42°20′02″N 71°07′33″W	Brookline Hills	
55	House at 53 Linden Street	House at 53 Linden Street	October 17, 1985 (#85003291)	53 Linden St. 42°20′04″N 71°06′59″W	Brookline Village	
56	House at 83 Penniman Place	House at 83 Penniman Place	October 17, 1985 (#85003292)	83 Penniman Pl. 42°19′54″N 71°08′54″W	Fisher Hill	Damaged by fire and demolished in 2009.
57	House at 89 Rawson Road and 86 Colburne Crescent	House at 89 Rawson Road and 86 Colburne Crescent	October 17, 1985 (#85003302)	89 Rawson Rd. and 86 Colburne Crescent; 42°20′05″N 71°08′02″W	Aspinwall Hill	
58	House at 9 Linden Street	House at 9 Linden Street	October 17, 1985 (#85003293)	9 Linden St. 42°20′04″N 71°07′08″W	Brookline Village	
59	Houses at 76–96 Harvard Avenue	Houses at 76–96 Harvard Avenue	October 17, 1985 (#85003294)	76–96 Harvard Ave. 42°20′13″N 71°07′32″W	Harvard Avenue	
60	Thaddeus Jackson House	Thaddeus Jackson House	October 17, 1985 (#85003295)	15 Alberta Rd. 42°18′21″N 71°09′16″W	South Brookline	
61	John Fitzgerald Kennedy National Historic Site	John Fitzgerald Kennedy National Historic Site	May 26, 1967 (#67000001)	83 Beals St. 42°20′53″N 71°07′34″W	Coolidge Corner	
62	Kilsyth Terrace	Kilsyth Terrace	October 17, 1985 (#85003296)	15–27 Kilsyth Rd. 42°19′45″N 71°08′39″W	Corey Farm	
63	Linden Park	Linden Park	October 17, 1985 (#85003297)	Linden Pl. and Linden St. 42°20′37″N 71°07′09″W	Brookline Village	
64	Linden Square	Linden Square	October 17, 1985 (#85003298)	Linden Pl. 42°20′06″N 71°07′02″W	Brookline Village	
65	Longwood Historic District	Longwood Historic District	September 13, 1978 (#78000460)	Roughly bounded by Chapel, St. Marys, Monmouth, and Kent Sts. 42°20′32″N 71°06′40″W	Longwood	
66	Lynch-O'Gorman House	Lynch-O'Gorman House	October 17, 1985 (#85003299)	41 Mason Terr. 42°20′26″N 71°07′56″W	Corey Hill	
67	Milestone	Milestone	October 17, 1985 (#85003300)	Boylston Street at Warren Street; 42°19′43″N 71°07′59″W	Chestnut Hill	
68	George R. Minot House	George R. Minot House	January 7, 1976 (#76001976)	71 Sears Rd. 42°19′03″N 71°08′21″W	Brookline	
69	William Murphy House	William Murphy House	October 17, 1985 (#85003303)	97 Sewall Ave. 42°20′30″N 71°07′02″W	Longwood	
70	Olmsted Park System	Olmsted Park System	December 8, 1971 (#71000086)	Encompassing the Back Bay Fens, Muddy River, Olmsted (Leverett Park), Jamaica Park, Arborway, and Franklin Park; 42°20′43″N 71°05′45″W	Brookline	Extends into Boston, Suffolk County
71	Frederick Law Olmsted House National Historic Site	Frederick Law Olmsted House National Historic Site	October 15, 1966 (#66000780)	99 Warren St. 42°19′31″N 71°07′58″W	Brookline	
72	Rev. John Orrock House	Rev. John Orrock House	October 17, 1985 (#85003304)	64 Winchester St. 42°20′33″N 71°07′51″W	Corey Hill	
73	Paine Estate	Paine Estate	October 17, 1985 (#85003305)	325 Heath St. 42°19′21″N 71°09′15″W	Woodland-Heath	
74	Perkins Estate	Perkins Estate	October 17, 1985 (#85003306)	450 Warren St. 42°19′14″N 71°08′39″W	Brookline	
75	Pill Hill Historic District	Pill Hill Historic District	December 16, 1977 (#77000187)	Roughly bounded by Boylston St., Pond Ave., Acron, Oakland and Highland Rds. 42°19′41″N 71°07′14″W	Pill Hill	
76	Reservoir Park	Reservoir Park	October 17, 1985 (#85003307)	Boylston St. 42°19′35″N 71°08′12″W	Brookline	
77	Richmond Court	Richmond Court	July 18, 1985 (#85001575)	1209–1217 Beacon St. 42°20′35″N 71°06′59″W	North Brookline	
78	Ritchie Building	Ritchie Building	October 17, 1985 (#85003308)	112 Cypress St. 42°19′51″N 71°07′34″W	Brookline Hills	
79	Roughwood	Roughwood	October 17, 1985 (#85003309)	400 Heath St. 42°19′13″N 71°09′30″W	Woodland-Heath	Now the campus of Pine Manor College.
80	Saint Aidan's Church and Rectory	Saint Aidan's Church and Rectory	October 17, 1985 (#85003310)	207 Freeman and 158 Pleasant Sts. 42°20′51″N 71°07′11″W	North Brookline	
81	St. Mark's Methodist Church	St. Mark's Methodist Church	December 17, 1976 (#76000268)	90 Park St. 42°20′21″N 71°07′31″W	Coolidge Corner	
82	Saint Mary of the Assumption Church, Rectory, School and Convent	Saint Mary of the Assumption Church, Rectory, School and Convent	October 17, 1985 (#85003311)	67 Harvard St. and 3 and 5 Linden Pl. 42°20′06″N 71°07′11″W	Brookline Village	
83	Saint Paul's Church, Chapel, and Parish House	Saint Paul's Church, Chapel, and Parish House	October 17, 1985 (#85003312)	15 and 27 Saint Paul St. and 104 Aspinwall Ave. 42°20′14″N 71°07′06″W	Brookline Village	
84	Saint Paul's Rectory	Saint Paul's Rectory	October 17, 1985 (#85003313)	130 Aspinwall Ave. 42°20′14″N 71°07′04″W	Brookline Village	
85	Sargent's Pond	Sargent's Pond	October 17, 1985 (#85003314)	Sargent Rd. 42°19′17″N 71°07′40″W	Brookline	
86	Second Unitarian Church	Second Unitarian Church	October 17, 1985 (#85003315)	11 Charles St. 42°21′06″N 71°07′46″W	Coolidge Corner	
87	Eliphalet Spurr House	Eliphalet Spurr House	October 17, 1985 (#85003316)	103 Walnut St. 42°19′52″N 71°07′09″W	Pill Hill	
88	James H. Standish House	James H. Standish House	October 17, 1985 (#85003317)	54 Francis St. 42°20′19″N 71°06′57″W	Brookline Village	
89	Strathmore Road Historic District	Strathmore Road Historic District	October 17, 1985 (#85003318)	Strathmore Rd. and Clinton Path; 42°20′10″N 71°08′48″W	Cleveland Circle	
90	Winand Toussaint House	Winand Toussaint House	October 17, 1985 (#85003319)	203 Aspinwall Ave. 42°20′09″N 71°06′56″W	Brookline Village	
91	Town Stable	Town Stable	October 17, 1985 (#85003320)	235 Cypress St. 42°20′39″N 71°07′29″W	Pill Hill	
92	William F. Tuckerman House	William F. Tuckerman House	October 17, 1985 (#85003321)	63 Harvard Ave. 42°20′12″N 71°07′27″W	Harvard Avenue	
93	Ginery Twichell House	Ginery Twichell House	October 17, 1985 (#85003240)	17 Kent St. 42°19′59″N 71°07′05″W	Brookline Village	
94	VFW Parkway, Metropolitan Park System of Greater Boston	VFW Parkway, Metropolitan Park System of Greater Boston	January 5, 2005 (#04001432)	VFW Parkway, between Spring and Centre Sts. 42°17′10″N 71°09′31″W	South Brookline	Most of its length is in Boston in Suffolk County.
95	Walnut Hills Cemetery	Walnut Hills Cemetery	October 17, 1985 (#85003241)	Grove St. and Allandale Rd. 42°18′10″N 71°08′50″W	South Brookline	
96	West Roxbury Parkway, Metropolitan Park System of Greater Boston	West Roxbury Parkway, Metropolitan Park System of Greater Boston	January 19, 2006 (#05001528)	West Roxbury Parkway, Bellevue Hill, E. Border Rd., and W. Border Rd. 42°18′10″N 71°09′11″W	South Brookline	Extends into Boston in Suffolk County
97	White Place Historic District	White Place Historic District	October 17, 1985 (#85003243)	White Pl. between Washington St. and Davis Path; 42°19′22″N 71°07′10″W	Emerson Garden	
98	Benjamin White House	Benjamin White House	October 17, 1985 (#85003242)	203 Heath St. 42°19′20″N 71°08′58″W	Woodland-Heath	

== See also ==
- National Register of Historic Places listings in Norfolk County, Massachusetts
