= White Place Historic District =

White Place Historic District may refer to:

- White Place Historic District (Illinois), Bloomington, Illinois
- White Place Historic District (Massachusetts), Brookline, Massachusetts
