= Town Stable =

- U.S. National Register of Historic Places
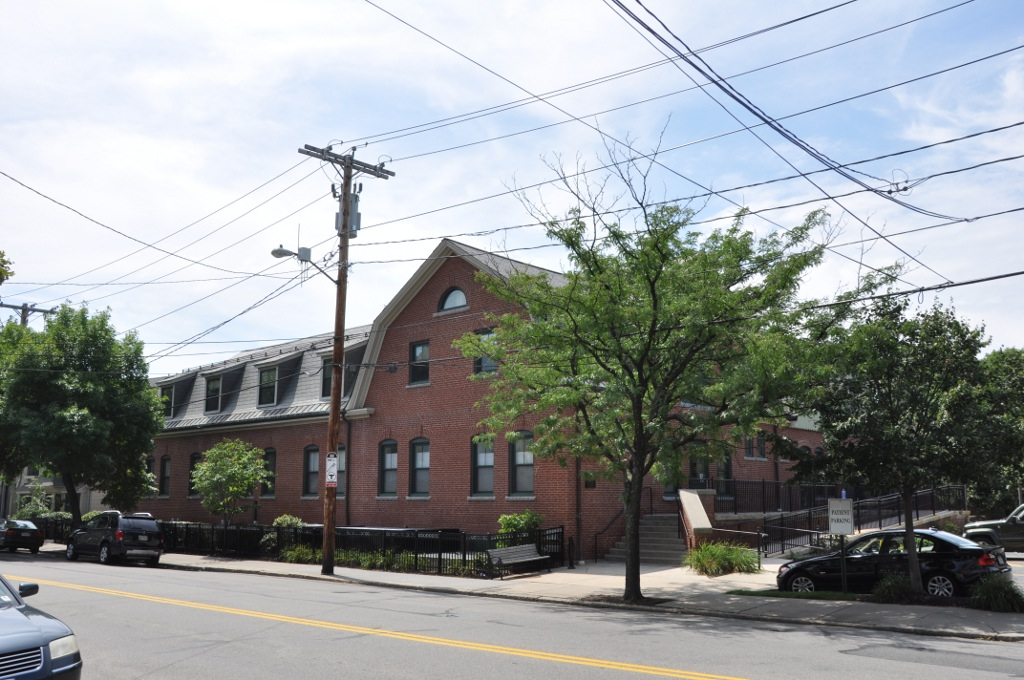

- Location within Massachusetts Location within the United States
- Location: 235 Cypress St., Brookline, Massachusetts
- Coordinates: 42°20′39″N 71°7′29″W
- Built: 1874
- Architect: Kirby, Charles; Peabody & Stearns
- Architectural style: Colonial Revival, Gothic Revival, Georgian Revival
- MPS: Brookline MRA
- NRHP reference No.: 85003320
- Added to NRHP: October 17, 1985

The Town Stable is a historic municipal public works building at 235 Cypress Street in Brookline, Massachusetts. With its oldest portion dating to 1874, it is one of the town's oldest municipal buildings. The building constructed then was designed with Gothic Revival styling by Charles Kirby, and was designed to stable 20 horses. The building was enlarged in 1898 to a design by Peabody & Stearns, adding more stable space along Cypress Street, and converting the original building into carriage storage and maintenance. The addition has a mansard roof and Georgian Revival detailing.

The building was listed on the National Register of Historic Places in 1985.

== See also ==
- National Register of Historic Places listings in Brookline, Massachusetts
