= House at 4 Perry Street =

Historic house in Massachusetts, United States

- U.S. National Register of Historic Places
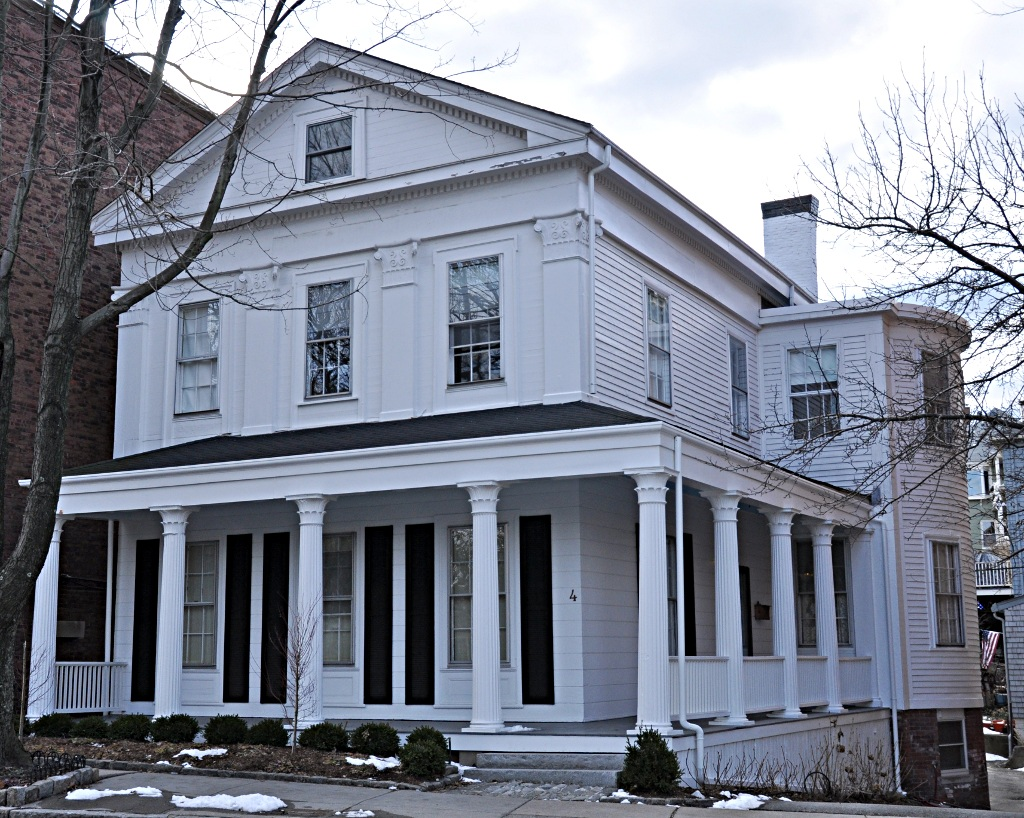

- Location within Massachusetts
- Location: 4 Perry St., Brookline, Massachusetts
- Coordinates: 42°20′7″N 71°7′4″W
- Built: 1843
- Architectural style: Greek Revival
- MPS: Brookline MRA
- NRHP reference No.: 85003287
- Added to NRHP: October 17, 1985

4 Perry Street is a historic house in Brookline, Massachusetts, USA. It is locally significant as a well-preserved local example of Greek Revival styling.

== Description ==
The 2 1/2-story wood-frame building was built in 1843, and was one of the first houses built in the Linden Square development. It has a fully pedimented gable, with pilasters between each of the windows on the second level. The walls under the single-story porch are flushboarded, and the columns supporting the porch have a distinctive acanthus-leaf molding near the top.

The house was listed on the National Register of Historic Places on October 17, 1985.

== See also ==
- National Register of Historic Places listings in Brookline, Massachusetts
