= House at 38–40 Webster Place =

Historic house in Massachusetts, United States

- U.S. National Register of Historic Places
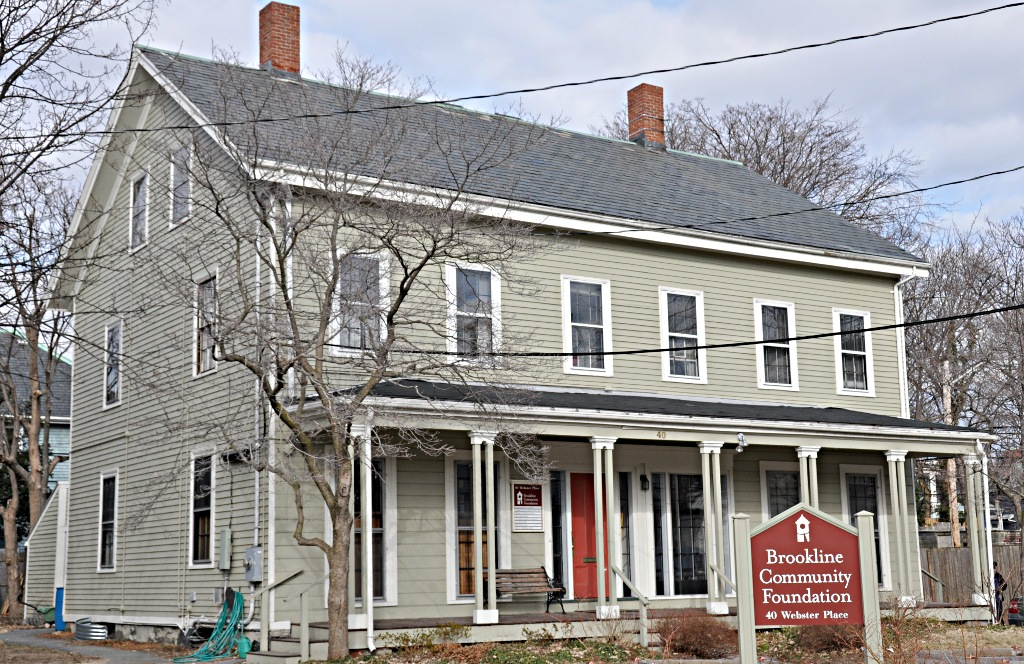

- Location within Massachusetts Location within the United States
- Location: 38–40 Webster Pl., Brookline, Massachusetts
- Coordinates: 42°20′1.64″N 71°7′1.4″W
- Built: 1855
- Architectural style: Greek Revival, Italianate
- MPS: Brookline MRA
- NRHP reference No.: 85003286
- Added to NRHP: October 17, 1985

The house at 38–40 Webster Place in Brookline, Massachusetts, is a rare local example of transitional Greek Revival-Italianate styling.

== Description and history ==
The wood-framed 2 1/2-story two-family house was built c. 1855–56 as a rental property by either Bela Stoddard or his son George. It has a side-gable roof, with a single-story porch extending across the five-bay front facade. The walls under the porch are finished in flushboard, a Greek Revival feature, while the porch supports are Italianate in style.

The building was listed on the National Register of Historic Places on October 17, 1985.

== See also ==
- National Register of Historic Places listings in Brookline, Massachusetts
