= House at 12 Linden Street =

Historic house in Massachusetts, United States

- U.S. National Register of Historic Places
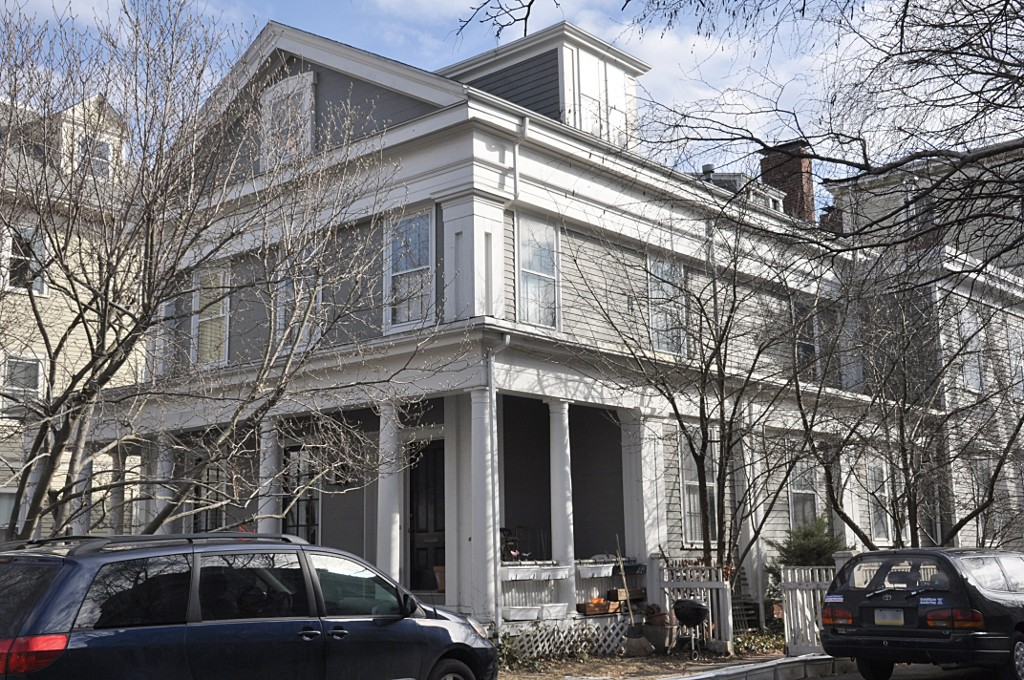

- Location within Massachusetts
- Location: 12 Linden Street, Brookline, Massachusetts
- Coordinates: 42°20′4.97″N 71°7′3.52″W
- Built: 1843
- Architectural style: Greek Revival
- MPS: Brookline MRA
- NRHP reference No.: 85003279
- Added to NRHP: October 17, 1985

12 Linden Street is a historic house located in Brookline, Massachusetts. It is a rare local example of Greek Revival styling, and one of a few houses to survive from the residential development of the Linden Street area in the 1840s.

== Description ==
The 2 1/2-story wood-frame house was built in 1843, and faces Linden Park, part of the original subdivision; it has a fully pedimented gable end, a heavy cornice, and pilastered cornerboards. The first owner was Charles Scudder, a merchant working in Boston.

The house was listed on the National Register of Historic Places on October 17, 1985.

== See also ==
- National Register of Historic Places listings in Brookline, Massachusetts
