= House at 44 Linden Street =

Historic house in Massachusetts, United States

- U.S. National Register of Historic Places
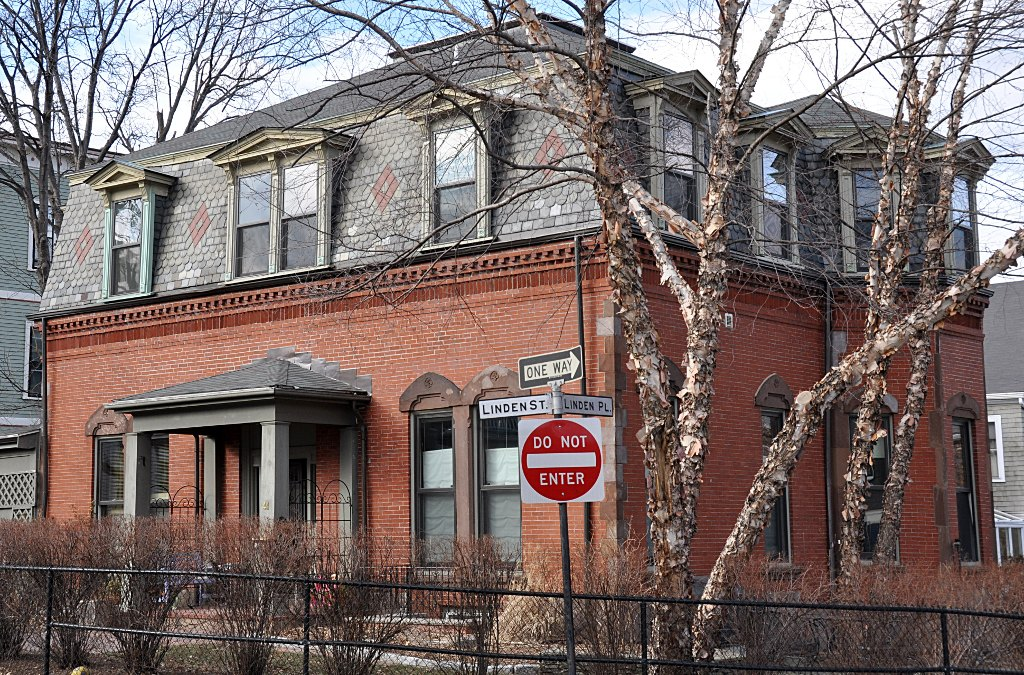

- Location within Massachusetts Location within the United States
- Location: 44 Linden St., Brookline, Massachusetts
- Coordinates: 42°20′4.64″N 71°6′58.93″W
- Built: 1872
- Architectural style: Second Empire, Mansard
- MPS: Brookline MRA
- NRHP reference No.: 85003288
- Added to NRHP: October 17, 1985

The House at 44 Linden Street in Brookline, Massachusetts, is a little-altered local example of Second Empire styling. The 1 1/2-story house was built in 1874 by Solomon Eaton on land that was owned for many years by Thomas Aspinwall Davis. It has classic Second Empire features, including a mansard roof, polygonal bay windows, and brownstone window arches. The only significant alteration is a sunporch on the left side. It was converted into a two-family in 1923.

The house was listed on the National Register of Historic Places in 1985.

== See also ==
- National Register of Historic Places listings in Brookline, Massachusetts
