= Strathmore Road Historic District =

Historic district in Massachusetts, United States

- U.S. National Register of Historic Places
- U.S. Historic district
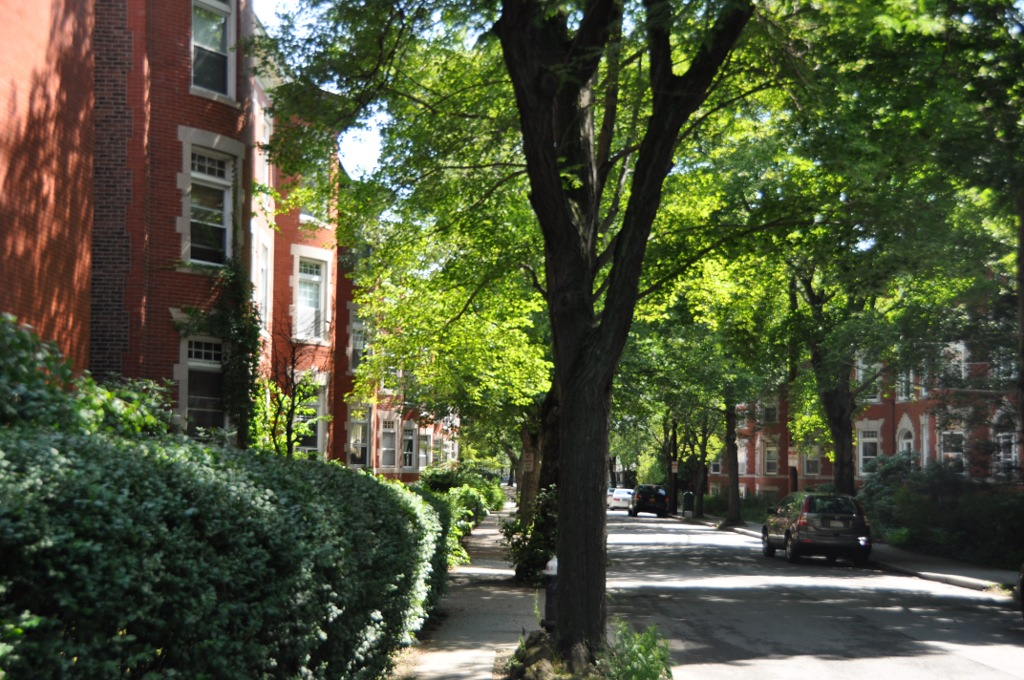
- Strathmore Road

- Location within Massachusetts Location within the United States
- Location: Strathmore Rd. and Clinton Path, Brookline, Massachusetts
- Coordinates: 42°20′10″N 71°8′48″W
- Area: 4 acres (1.6 ha)
- Built: 1904
- Architect: Boyle, Murdock; Hutchinson, James
- Architectural style: Classical Revival, Romanesque
- MPS: Brookline MRA
- NRHP reference No.: 85003318
- Added to NRHP: October 17, 1985

The Strathmore Road Historic District is a residential historic district on Strathmore Road and Clinton Path in Brookline, Massachusetts. It consists of six brick apartment blocks, four of which lie on Strathmore Road, and two of which lie on Clinton Path. The two streets form a loop just south of the westernmost portion (in Brookline) of Beacon Street, and abutting the MBTA Green Line yard at Cleveland Circle. The district is reflective of the area's growth as a commuter suburb following the development of the rail line along Beacon Street (now the MBTA Green Line "C" branch), and was listed on the National Register of Historic Places in 1985.

Beacon Street and the rail line were extended to Cleveland Circle in the 1880s, and the area was soon developed to provide housing for commuters into Boston. Charles Newhall and George Johnston were two major developers whose projects line Beacon Street, and who were responsible for the development of Strathmore Road as well. This development took place between 1904 and 1908. The buildings are 3-1/2 story brick buildings, most designed by either James Hutchinson or Murdock Boyle. Five of the six buildings were built by Johnston; only 1 Clinton Path was built by Newhall. They are built with consistent setbacks, large enough to provide each building with a small front yard, and with sufficient space to allow for the planting of trees.

The basic styling of most of the buildings is either Federal or Classical Revival. Typical features include limestone wedges above the windows, and cornices with dentil molding and modillions. Two of the buildings (40 Strathmore and 1 Clinton) are Romanesque in style, using rusticated brownstone and with round-arched entries.

== See also ==
- National Register of Historic Places listings in Brookline, Massachusetts
