= House at 89 Rawson Road and 86 Colburne Crescent =

Historic house in Massachusetts, United States

- House at 89 Rawson Road and 86 Colbourne Crescent
- U.S. National Register of Historic Places
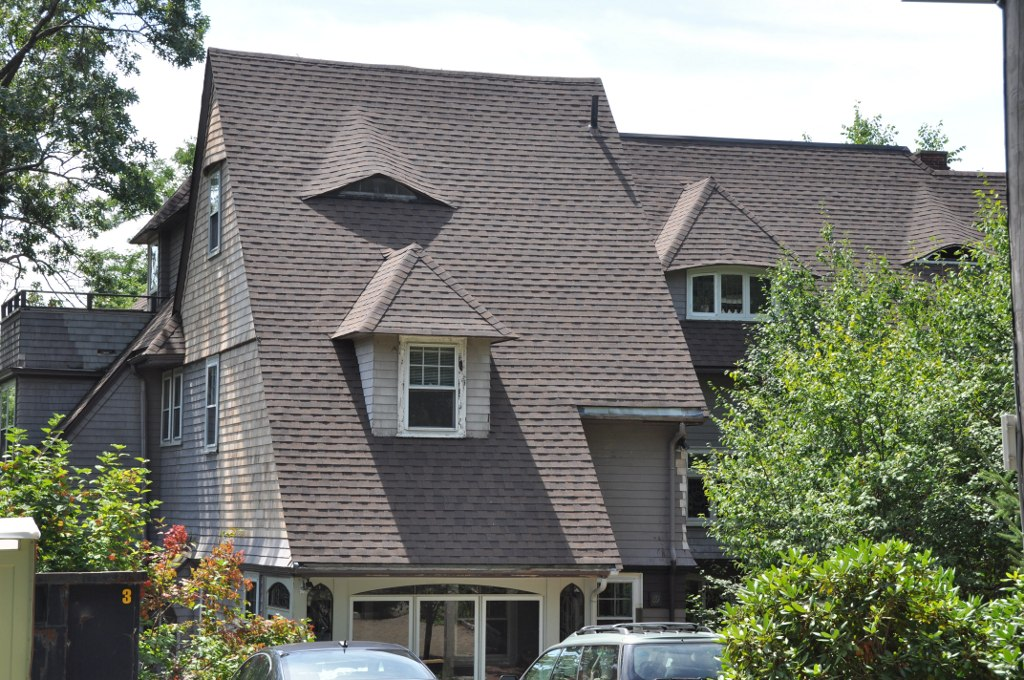
- View from Colbourne Crescent

- Location within Massachusetts
- Location: 89 Rawson Rd. and 86 Colbourne Crescent, Brookline, Massachusetts
- Coordinates: 42°20′5″N 71°8′2″W
- Built: 1900
- Architect: Chapman & Frazer
- Architectural style: Shingle Style
- MPS: Brookline MRA
- NRHP reference No.: 85003302
- Added to NRHP: October 17, 1985

89 Rawson Road and 86 Colbourne Crescent are two historic Shingle Style houses located in Brookline, Massachusetts.

== Description and history ==
The 2 1/2-story wood-frame house that was designed by Chapman & Frazer for Thomas Shepard, and built in 1900. It is a large Shingle-style house, with a profusion of gables and recesses, and a uniform covering of wood shingles. The house occupies a large lot on Aspinwall Hill, with commanding views of the area. Thomas Shepard worked in his father's lumber business in Boston, and was responsible for developing family-owned land in northern Brookline.

The house was listed on the National Register of Historic Places on October 17, 1985.

== See also ==
- National Register of Historic Places listings in Brookline, Massachusetts
