= Dr. Tappan Eustis Francis House =

Historic house in Massachusetts, United States

- U.S. National Register of Historic Places
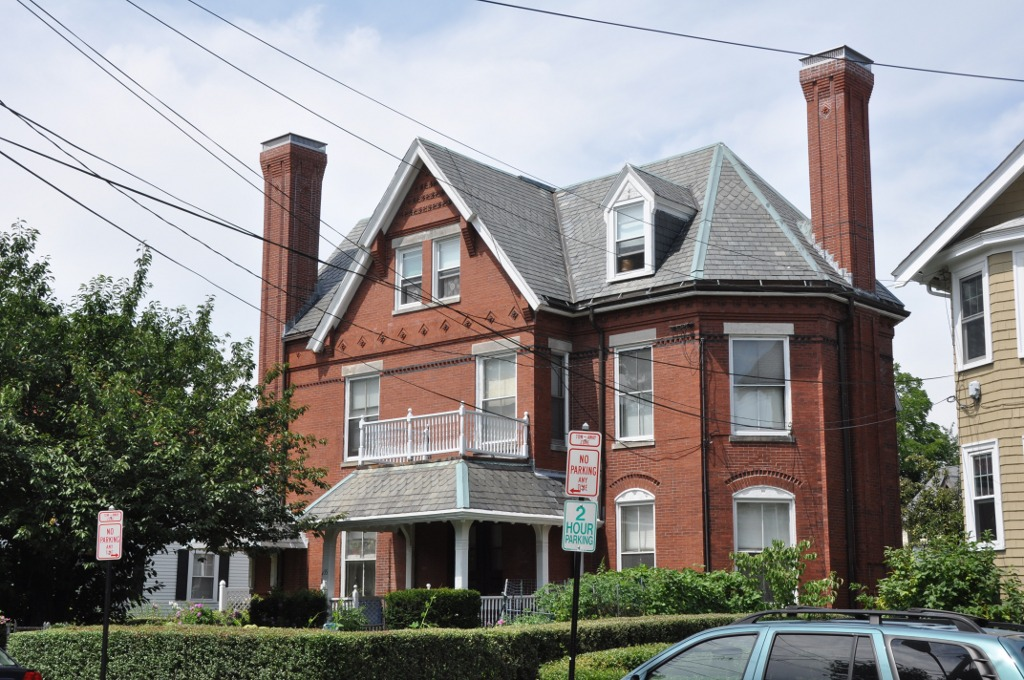

- Location within Massachusetts Location within the United States
- Location: 35 Davis Ave., Brookline, Massachusetts
- Coordinates: 42°19′57″N 71°7′14″W
- Built: 1878
- Architect: Emerson, William Ralph
- Architectural style: Queen Anne
- MPS: Brookline MRA
- NRHP reference No.: 85003267
- Added to NRHP: October 17, 1985

The Dr. Tappan Eustis Francis House is a historic house at 35 Davis Avenue in Brookline, Massachusetts. Built in 1877–78, the 2 1/2-story house is a well-preserved rendering of Queen Anne styling in brick. Its roof has varying patterns of slate tiles, and the facade has a variety of brickwork decorations. Its chimneys feature Panel brick design elements, and it has a Stick style porch. The house was built for a doctor who served the town for 50 years.

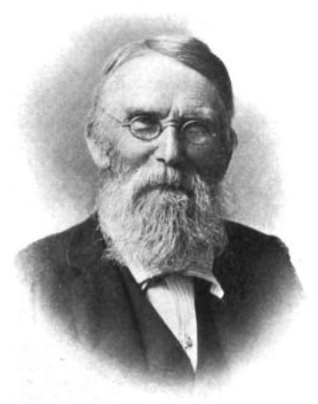
Dr. Tappan Eustis Francis

The house was listed on the National Register of Historic Places in 1985.

== See also ==
- National Register of Historic Places listings in Brookline, Massachusetts
