= Sargent's Pond =

- U.S. National Register of Historic Places
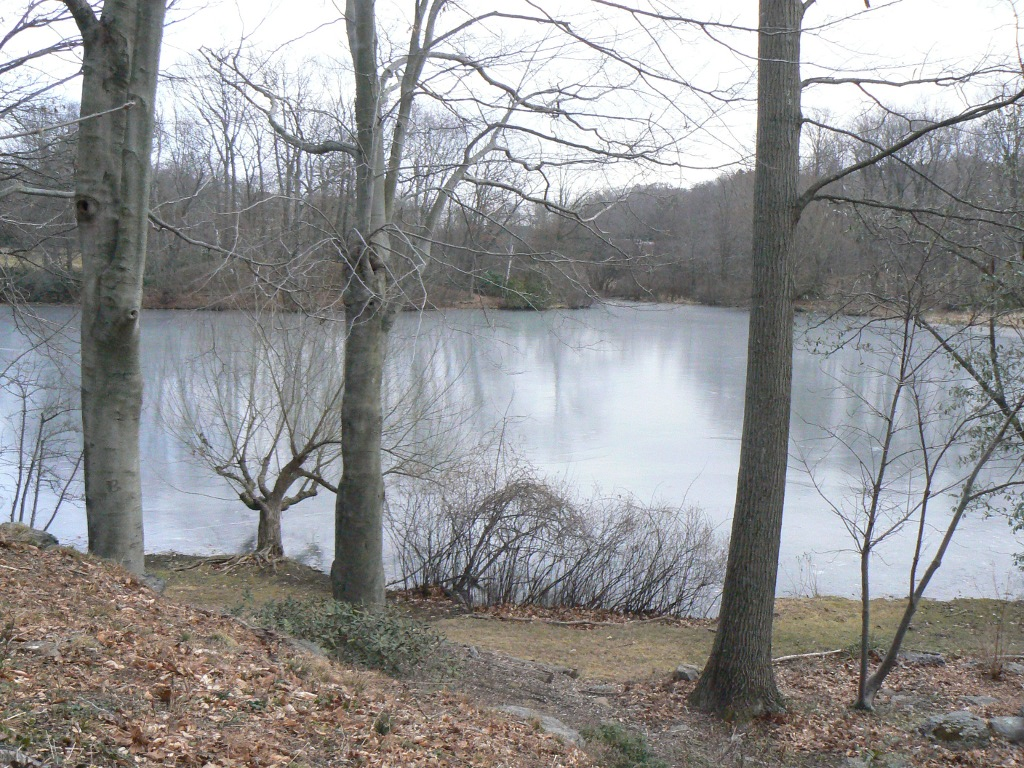
- The pond in winter

- Location within Massachusetts Location within the United States
- Location: Sargent Rd., Brookline, Massachusetts
- Coordinates: 42°19′16.58″N 71°7′39.66″W
- Area: 3 acres (1.2 ha)
- Architect: Sargent, Charles Sprague
- MPS: Brookline MRA
- NRHP reference No.: 85003314
- Added to NRHP: October 17, 1985

Sargent's Pond is a man-made 3-acre (1.2 ha) pond on Sargent Road in Brookline, Massachusetts, United States. The pond was created by Charles Sprague Sargent (best known as the first director of the Arnold Arboretum) in the late 1870s as a centerpiece of his family's extensive Holm Lea estate. Sargent's estate has since been subdivided, but the roads giving access to it run along the estate's original alignments. Sargent landscaped the estate using similar principles to those he applied at the Arboretum, with vistas and a variety of trees and shrubs. The pond was created by damming a brook. It still has naturalistic plantings around it, although some Sargent's rhododendrons (a significant draw on occasions when he opened the estate to the public) have died.

The pond (along with its immediately surrounding grounds) was listed on the National Register of Historic Places in 1985.

== See also ==
- National Register of Historic Places listings in Brookline, Massachusetts
