= William F. Tuckerman House =

Historic house in Massachusetts, United States

- U.S. National Register of Historic Places
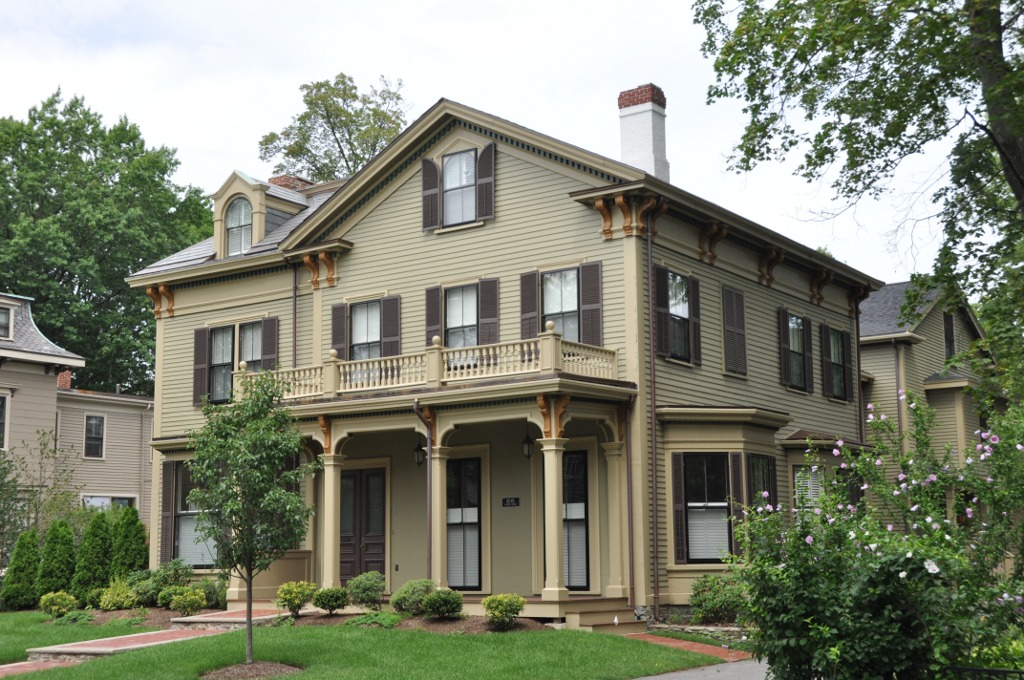

- Location within Massachusetts Location within the United States
- Location: 63 Harvard Ave., Brookline, Massachusetts
- Coordinates: 42°20′12″N 71°7′27″W
- Built: 1856
- Architectural style: Italianate
- MPS: Brookline MRA
- NRHP reference No.: 85003321
- Added to NRHP: October 17, 1985

The William F. Tuckerman House is a historic house located at 63 Harvard Avenue in Brookline, Massachusetts.

== Description and history ==
The 2 1/2-story wood-frame house was built in 1856, and is a well-preserved local example of high-style Italianate design. It has a low-pitch gable roof, with dentil moulding in the gable eave, and a round-arch window near the apex of the gable. The roof cornice has paired brackets, and the front porch, which extends across the three-bay front of the main block, is supported by square posts with brackets.

The house was listed on the National Register of Historic Places on October 17, 1985.

== See also ==
- National Register of Historic Places listings in Brookline, Massachusetts
