= House at 105 Marion Street =

Historic house in Massachusetts, United States

- U.S. National Register of Historic Places
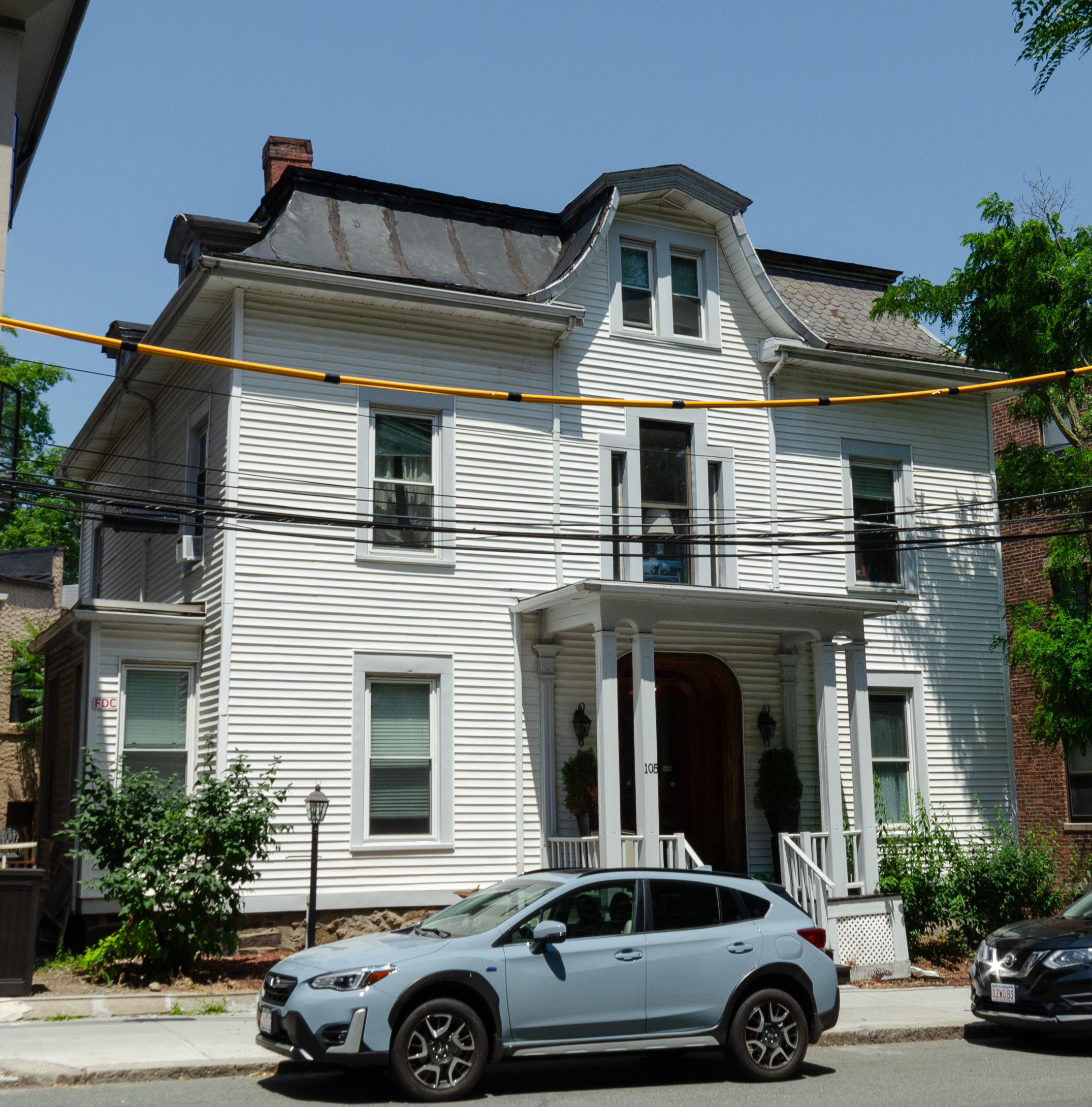
- House at 105 Marion Street, June 2023

- Location within Massachusetts
- Location: 105 Marion St., Brookline, Massachusetts
- Coordinates: 42°19′51″N 71°7′29″W
- Built: 1861–1862
- Architectural style: Second Empire style
- MPS: Brookline MRA
- NRHP reference No.: 85003278
- Added to NRHP: October 17, 1985

105 Marion Street is a historic house located in Brookline, Massachusetts. It is significant as a well-preserved local example of the Second Empire style of architecture.

== Description and history ==
The 2 1/2-story wood-frame house was built in 1861–1862. It has a typical mansard roof, with a central bell-shaped pediment above the centered front entrance. The pediment stands above a Palladian window with narrow side windows, which is above the main entry. The entry is sheltered by a porch supported by paired square columns.

The house was listed on the National Register of Historic Places on October 17, 1985.

== See also ==
- National Register of Historic Places listings in Brookline, Massachusetts
