= Kilsyth Terrace =

- U.S. National Register of Historic Places
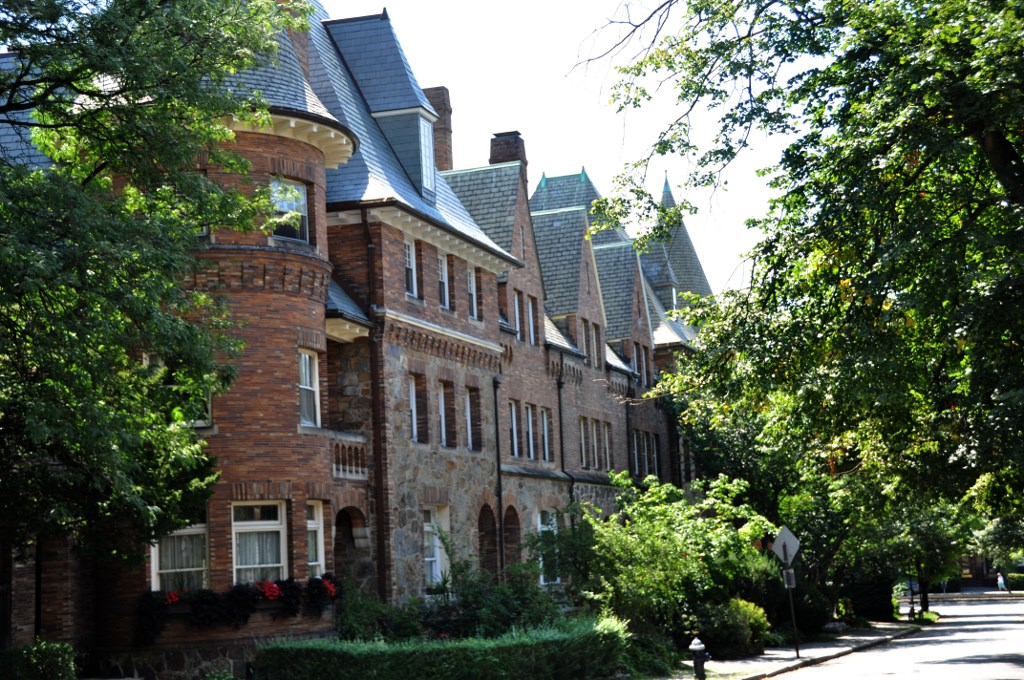

- Location within Massachusetts Location within the United States
- Location: 15–27 Kilsyth Rd., Brookline, Massachusetts
- Coordinates: 42°19′45″N 71°8′39″W
- Built: 1892
- Architect: Beal, J. W.
- Architectural style: Renaissance, Chateauesque
- MPS: Brookline MRA
- NRHP reference No.: 85003296
- Added to NRHP: October 17, 1985

Kilsyth Terrace is a historic series of townhouses at 15–27 Kilsyth Road in Brookline, Massachusetts. The Chateau-style townhouses were designed by J. Williams Beal and built in 1892. They are 3 1/2-story townhouses, built of yellow brick with Roxbury stone trim. Notable features include turrets, arched entrances and corbelled brickwork. Their design was likely influenced by the earlier Beaconsfield Terraces development, not far away on Beacon and Tappan Streets.

The building was listed on the National Register of Historic Places in 1985.

== See also ==
- National Register of Historic Places listings in Brookline, Massachusetts
