= House at 12 Vernon Street =

Historic house in Massachusetts, United States

- U.S. National Register of Historic Places
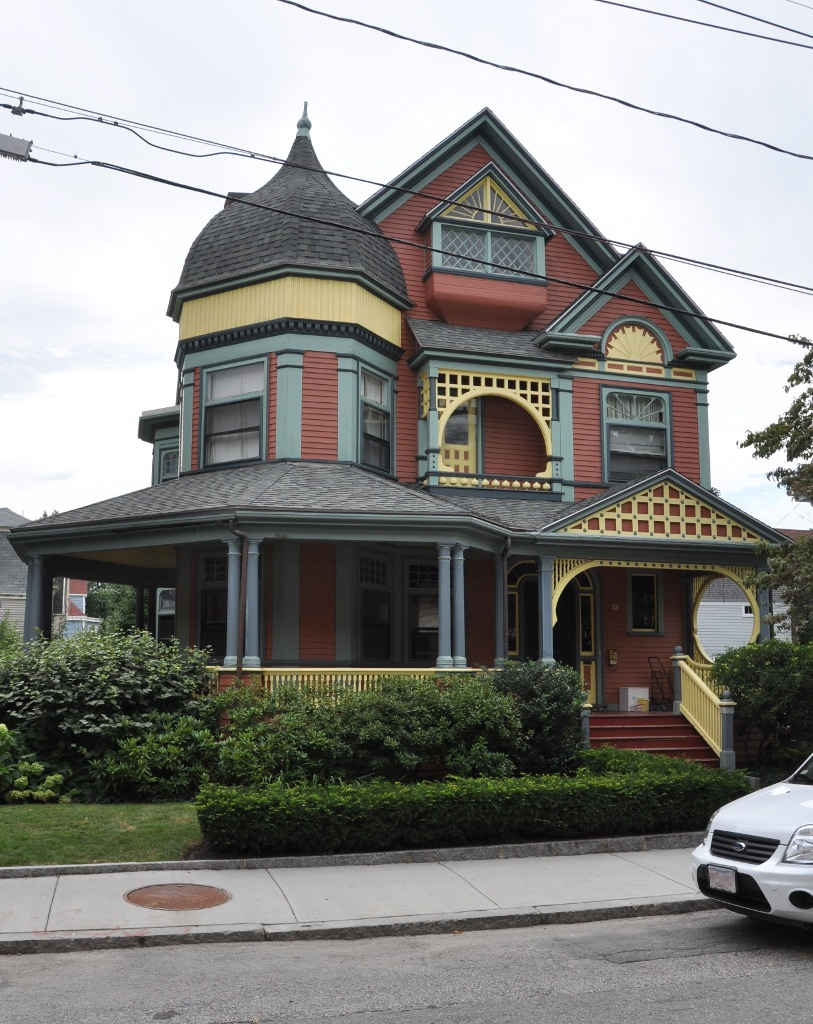

- Location within Massachusetts Location within the United States
- Location: 12 Vernon St., Brookline, Massachusetts
- Coordinates: 42°20′18″N 71°7′22″W
- Built: 1890
- Architect: Griffin, Tristram
- Architectural style: Queen Anne
- MPS: Brookline MRA
- NRHP reference No.: 85003280
- Added to NRHP: October 17, 1985

The House at 12 Vernon Street in Brookline, Massachusetts is one of the town's most elaborate Queen Anne Victorians. The 2 1/2-story wood-frame house was designed by Tristram Griffin and built in 1890 for William Boynton, a Boston flour merchant. It has classic Queen Anne elements, including a turret, multiple projecting and recessed sections. Its front porch wraps around the turret to the side, supported by paired columns above a spindled balustrade, and features a gable above the entry stairs decorated with latticework and arched spindlework framing the opening.

The house was listed on the National Register of Historic Places in 1985.

== See also ==
- National Register of Historic Places listings in Brookline, Massachusetts
