= House at 9 Linden Street =

Historic residence in the US

- U.S. National Register of Historic Places
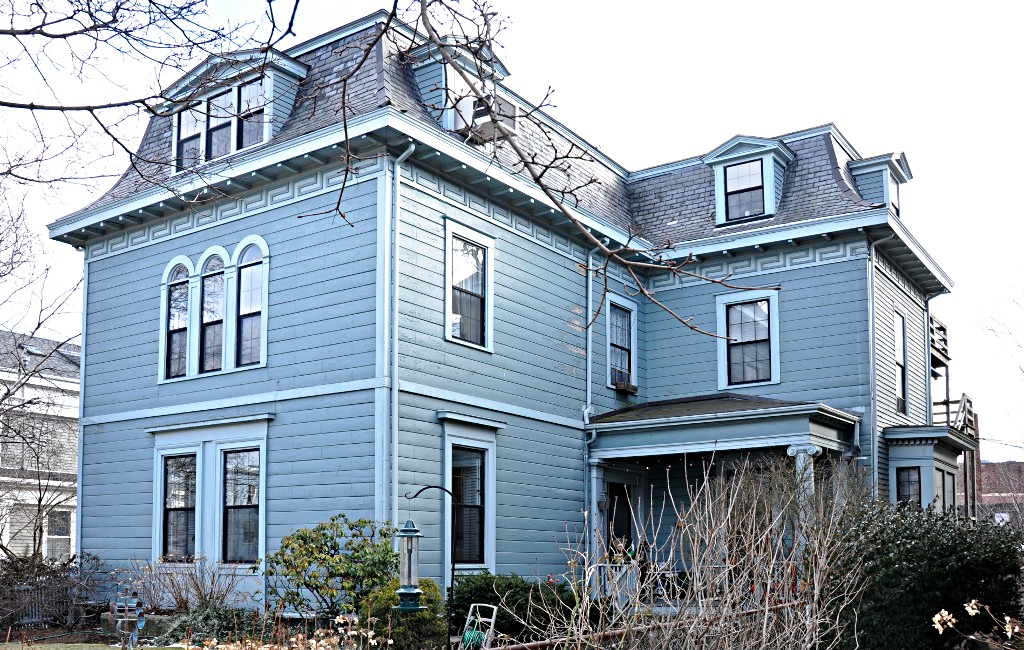

- Location within Massachusetts Location within the United States
- Location: 9 Linden St., Brookline, Massachusetts
- Coordinates: 42°20′4.82″N 71°7′6.04″W
- Built: 1844
- Architectural style: Greek Revival, Italianate
- MPS: Brookline MRA
- NRHP reference No.: 85003293
- Added to NRHP: October 17, 1985

The House at 9 Linden Street in Brookline, Massachusetts, USA, is a locally rare example of transitional Greek Revival and Italianate styling, and one of the few surviving houses from the original development of the Linden Street area in the 1840s. The 2 1/2-story wood-frame house was built in 1843 for Isaac Rich, a partner in a successful merchant firm and a co-founder of Boston University. The house's mansard roof is a later addition, probably dating to the 1860s.

The house was listed on the National Register of Historic Places in 1985.

== See also ==
- National Register of Historic Places listings in Brookline, Massachusetts
