= Houses at 76–96 Harvard Avenue =

Historic houses in Massachusetts, United States

- U.S. National Register of Historic Places
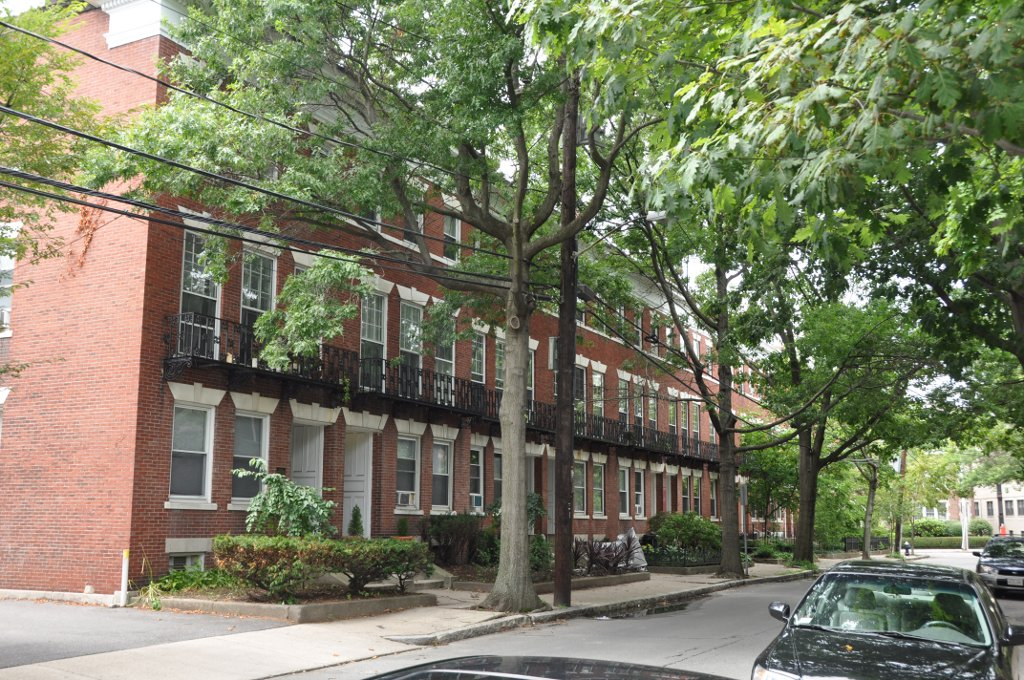

- Location within Massachusetts Location within the United States
- Location: 76–96 Harvard Ave., Brookline, Massachusetts
- Coordinates: 42°20′13″N 71°7′32″W
- Built: 1903
- Architect: S Brennan, S. Vaughan
- Architectural style: Colonial Revival, Georgian Revival
- MPS: Brookline MRA
- NRHP reference No.: 85003294
- Added to NRHP: October 17, 1985

The houses at 76–96 Harvard Avenue are historic rowhouses in Brookline, Massachusetts. Built in 1903 by Benjamin Whitney, this was one of the earliest series of rowhouses to be built in Brookline. They are of Colonial Revival style, built in brick with limestone trim, with iron balconies. Originally built as single-family units, each of the houses except number 76 was converted to three apartments in the 1940s and 1950s.

The rowhouses were listed on the National Register of Historic Places in 1985.

== See also ==
- National Register of Historic Places listings in Brookline, Massachusetts
