= James H. Standish House =

Historic house in Massachusetts, United States

- U.S. National Register of Historic Places
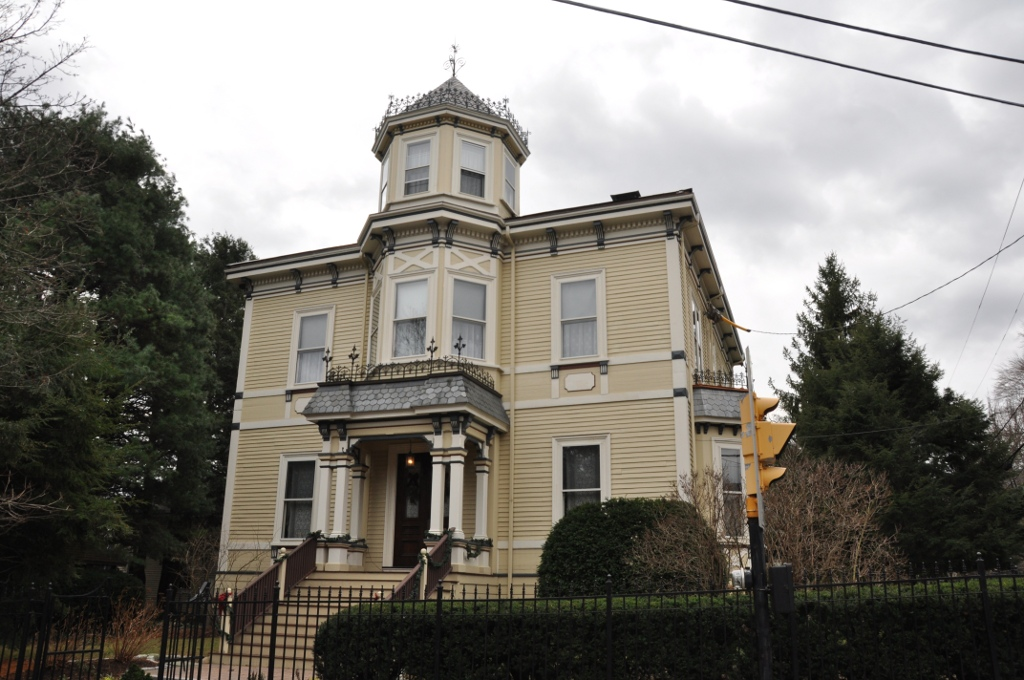

- Location within Massachusetts Location within the United States
- Location: 54 Francis St., Brookline, Massachusetts
- Coordinates: 42°20′19″N 71°6′57″W
- Built: 1874
- Architectural style: Stick-Eastlake, Italianate
- MPS: Brookline MRA
- NRHP reference No.: 85003317
- Added to NRHP: October 17, 1985

The James H. Standish House is a historic house located at 54 Francis Street in Brookline, Massachusetts.

Built c. 1874–75, the 2 1/2-story house and carriage barn are rare surviving examples in Brookline of elaborate Stick style. It has Italianate massing and facade organization, as well as other typically Italianate elements such as a cupola and a bracketed and dentiled cornice. However, it also has applied Stick-style decoration above and below some of its windows.

The house was listed on the National Register of Historic Places on October 17, 1985.

== See also ==
- National Register of Historic Places listings in Brookline, Massachusetts
