= House at 155 Reservoir Road =

Historic house in Massachusetts, United States

- U.S. National Register of Historic Places
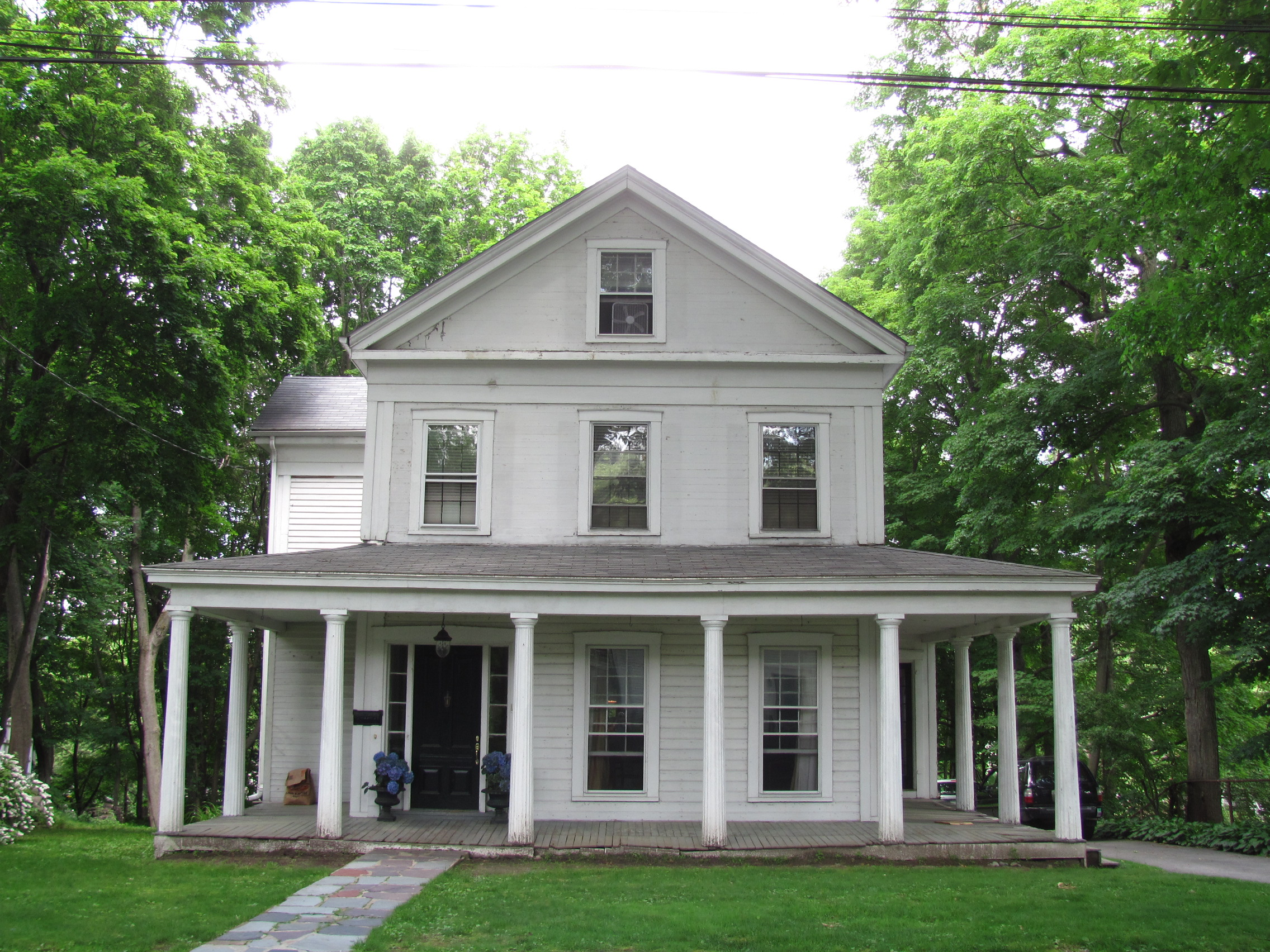
- House at 155 Reservoir

- Location within Massachusetts Location within the United States
- Location: 155 Reservoir Rd., Brookline, Massachusetts
- Coordinates: 42°19′39.54″N 71°8′58.85″W
- Architectural style: Greek Revival
- MPS: Brookline MRA
- NRHP reference No.: 85003282
- Added to NRHP: October 17, 1985

155 Reservoir Road is a historic house located in Brookline, Massachusetts. It is significant as a well-preserved Greek Revival house.

== Description ==
The 2 1/2-story wood-frame structure was built sometime between 1830 and 1844, probably by Daniel Pierce. It has a traditional side-hall plan, three bays across, with paneled pilasters, and a fully pedimented gable end. A single-story porch with fluted Doric columns wraps across the front and around both sides. The house was built at the corner of Boylston Street and Reservoir Road, and moved to its present location in 1920.

The house was listed on the National Register of Historic Places on October 17, 1985.

== See also ==
- National Register of Historic Places listings in Brookline, Massachusetts
