= Arcade Building (Brookline, Massachusetts) =

- U.S. National Register of Historic Places
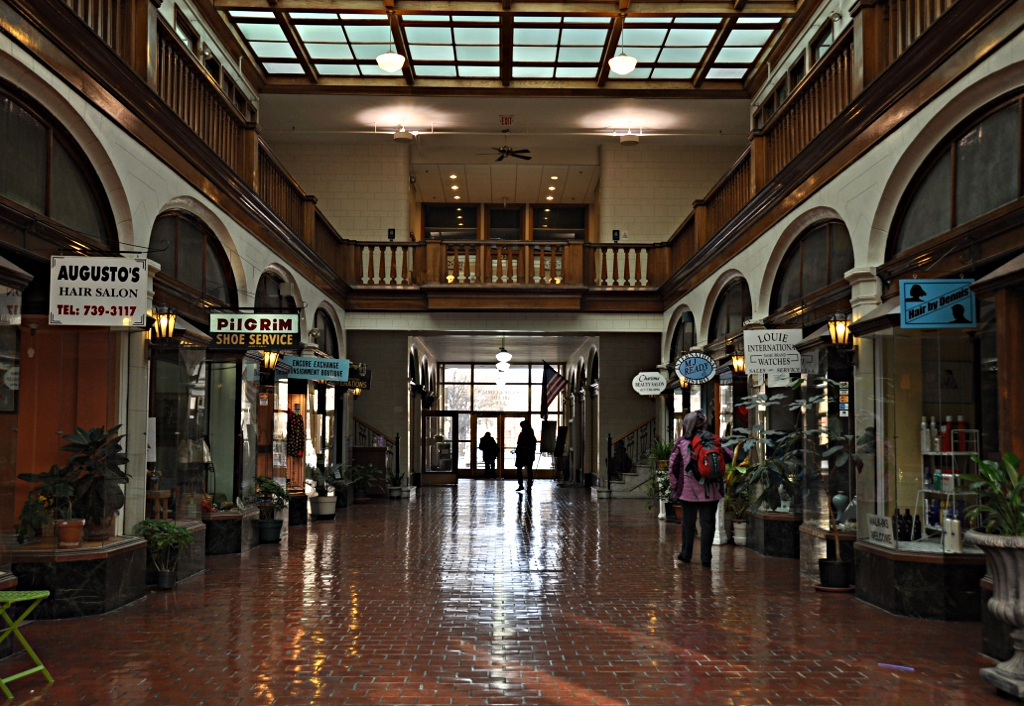

- Location within Massachusetts Location within the United States
- Location: 314–320A Harvard St., Brookline, Massachusetts
- Coordinates: 42°20′35″N 71°7′26″W
- Architect: Jacobs, George N.
- Architectural style: Commercial Gothic
- MPS: Brookline MRA
- NRHP reference No.: 85003247
- Added to NRHP: October 17, 1985

The Arcade Building is a historic commercial building at 314–320A Harvard Street in Brookline, Massachusetts. Built in 1926, it is a two-story cast stone structure, with an interior arcade lined by small shops. It is the only arcaded commercial building in Brookline. The building was listed on the National Register of Historic Places in 1985.

== Description and history ==
The Arcade Building is located on the south side of Harvard Street, a major north–south route through eastern Brookline. It is on the west side of Coolidge Corner, one of the town's major retail areas. It is a two-story commercial structure, built out of concrete and cast stone. The front facade is topped by a precast concrete frieze, with Gothic spires above at the bounds of the building's five bays. The interior of the building consists of a long two-story skylit atrium that is flanked by small shops on two levels. The interior retains many of its original features and fixtures.

The Arcade was built in 1926 by a local real estate developer named Johnson, to a design by George N. Jacobs. It is the only building of its type in Brookline, reminiscent of (but on a much smaller scale than) the Westminster Arcade, the nation's first enclosed shopping arcade, in Providence, Rhode Island. At the time of its construction, that part of Harvard Avenue was undergoing a rapid transition from a predominantly residential area to a more densely-built commercial area. The building continues to house retail spaces and professional offices.

== See also ==
- National Register of Historic Places listings in Brookline, Massachusetts
