= Paine Estate =

Historic house in Massachusetts, United States

- U.S. National Register of Historic Places
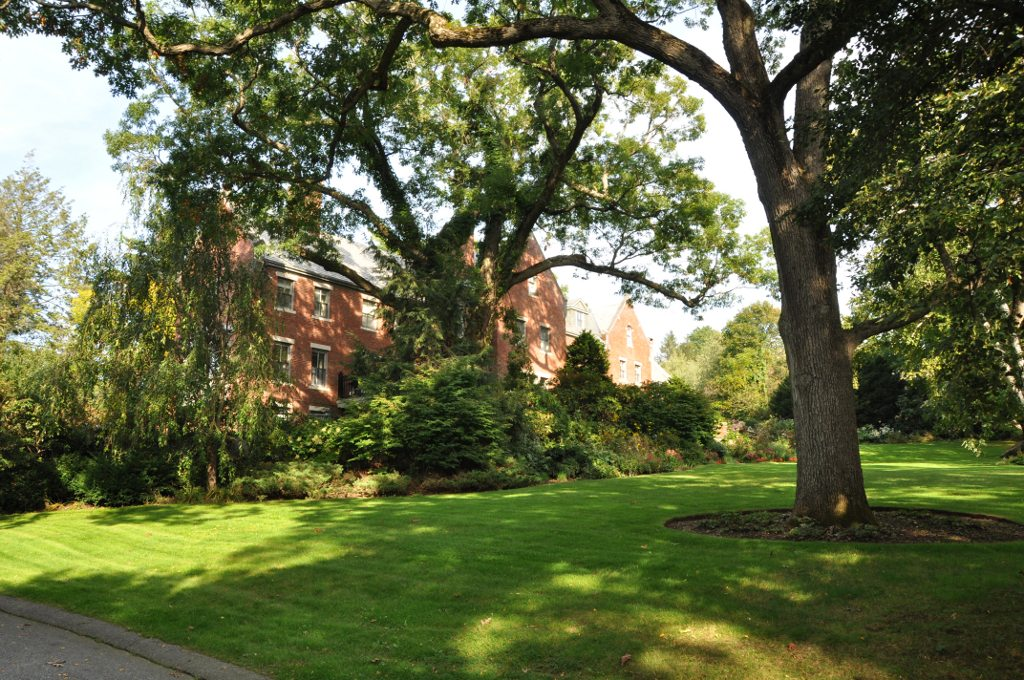

- Location within Massachusetts Location within the United States
- Location: 325 Heath St., Brookline, Massachusetts
- Coordinates: 42°19′21″N 71°9′15″W
- Area: 11 acres (4.5 ha)
- Built: 1893
- Architect: Andrews, Jaques & Rantoul
- Architectural style: Tudor Revival, Jacobethan Revival
- MPS: Brookline MRA
- NRHP reference No.: 85003305
- Added to NRHP: October 17, 1985

The Paine Estate is a historic estate at 325 Heath Street in Brookline, Massachusetts. The mansion on the expansive estate was built by Walter Channing Cabot for his daughter Ruth and son-in-law Robert T Paine, a nephew of Robert Treat Paine Jr. It is a Jacobethan style Medieval Revival structure built of brick, with Flemish end gables, limestone sills and lintels, and egg-and-dart panels. It is one of the last estates, of what was once a whole series, which lined Heath Streat. The only other to remain (albeit no longer in private hands) is Roughwood, now the campus of Pine Manor College.

The property was listed on the National Register of Historic Places in 1985.

== See also ==
- National Register of Historic Places listings in Brookline, Massachusetts
