= House at 12–16 Corey Road =

Historic house in Massachusetts, United States

- U.S. National Register of Historic Places
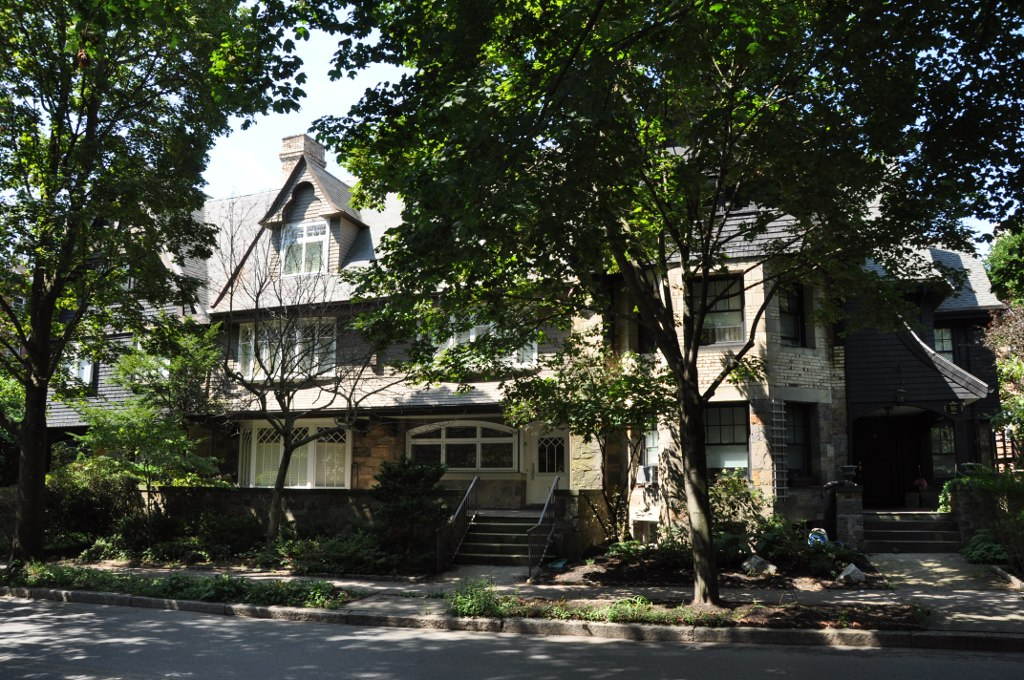

- Location within Massachusetts Location within the United States
- Location: 12–16 Corey Rd., Brookline, Massachusetts
- Coordinates: 42°20′17″N 71°8′35″W
- Built: 1896
- Architect: Arthur H. Bowditch
- Architectural style: Late 19th And 20th Century Revivals, Shingle Style, Medieval Revival
- MPS: Brookline MRA
- NRHP reference No.: 85003281
- Added to NRHP: October 17, 1985

The House at 12–16 Corey Road in Brookline, Massachusetts is a distinctive local example of townhouses in an English Revival style with Shingle elements. The townhouses were designed by Arthur H. Bowdith, a prominent local architect, and built in 1896 for Alan Arthur and Gardiner Shaw, two real estate agents. The townhouses have steeply pitched shingled gables, projecting diamond-pane windows, and bracketed bargeboard trim.

The houses were listed on the National Register of Historic Places in 1985.

== See also ==
- National Register of Historic Places listings in Brookline, Massachusetts
