= Green Hill Historic District =

Historic district in Massachusetts, United States

- U.S. National Register of Historic Places
- U.S. Historic district
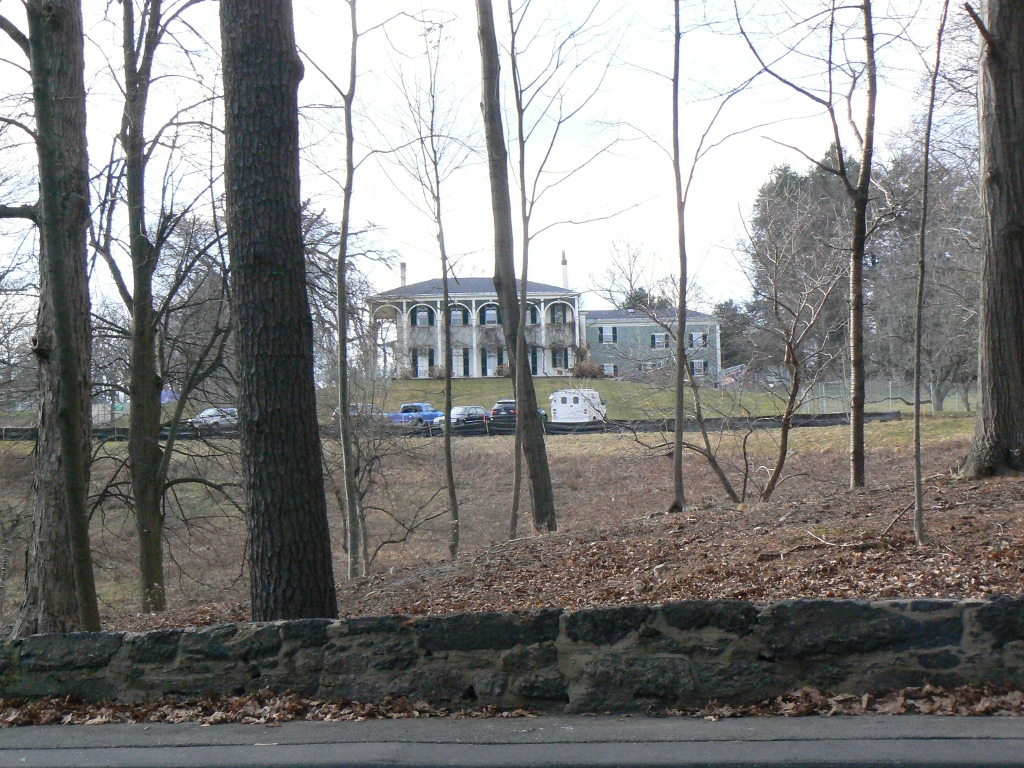
- One of several estates in the district

- Location within Massachusetts Location within the United States
- Location: Roughly Warren St., Sargent Rd., and Cottage St., Brookline, Massachusetts
- Coordinates: 42°19′18″N 71°7′59″W
- Area: 70 acres (28 ha)
- Architectural style: Late 19th And 20th Century Revivals, Late Victorian
- MPS: Brookline MRA
- NRHP reference No.: 85003272
- Added to NRHP: October 17, 1985

The Green Hill Historic District encompasses historical cross-section of residential housing in Brookline, Massachusetts, dating from the 18th century into the mid-20th century. The district includes properties on Warren, Cottage, and Fairmount Streets, and on Sargent Road, centered on the junction of Warren and Cottage Streets. The oldest houses (e.g. 215 Warren Street) date to the mid-18th century, and were originally modest Georgian or Federal structures. During the 19th century, the area was populated by the summer estates of some of Boston's leading merchant and business families, including members of the Cabot and Perkins families. During the later 19th and early 20th centuries, some of Brookline's largest and most architecturally interesting homes were built in this area.

The district was listed on the National Register of Historic Places in 1985.

== See also ==
- National Register of Historic Places listings in Brookline, Massachusetts
