= Graffam Development Historic District =

Historic district in Massachusetts, United States

- U.S. National Register of Historic Places
- U.S. Historic district
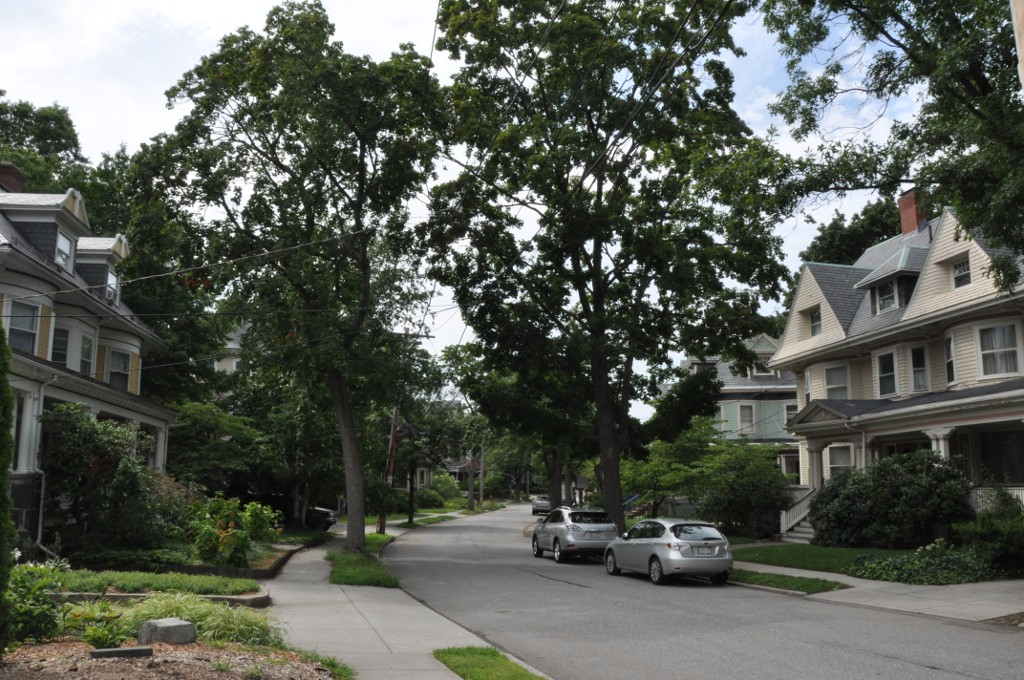
- Abbottsford Road

- Location within Massachusetts Location within the United States
- Location: Roughly bounded by Abbottsford Rd., Babcock St., Manchester, and Naples Rds., Brookline, Massachusetts
- Coordinates: 42°20′56″N 71°7′4″W
- Area: 9 acres (3.6 ha)
- Built: 1895
- Architect: Greenleaf and Cobb, et al.
- Architectural style: Colonial Revival, Queen Anne
- MPS: Brookline MRA
- NRHP reference No.: 85003271
- Added to NRHP: October 17, 1985

The Graffam Development Historic District is a residential area located in the American town of Brookline, Massachusetts. It encompasses the best-preserved portion of a historic residential subdivision, platted and built between 1894 and 1907. The land was purchased by Peter Graffam, who built a variety of Queen Anne and Colonial Revival houses on Babcock Street, Abbottsford Road, Manchester Road, Stedman Street, and Naples Road in Brookline, Massachusetts. Graffam also developed Osborne Street, but most of its houses have since been modified, losing historic integrity. The district was listed on the National Register of Historic Places in 1985.

== See also ==
- National Register of Historic Places listings in Brookline, Massachusetts
