= House at 19 Linden Street =

Historic house in Massachusetts, United States

- U.S. National Register of Historic Places
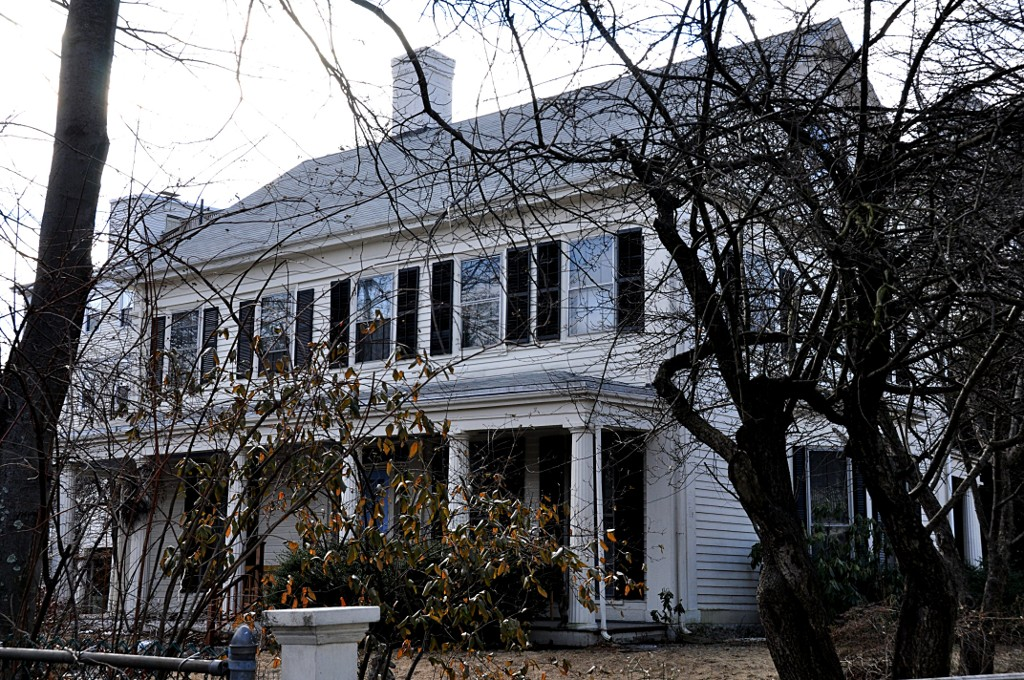

- Location within Massachusetts
- Location: 19 Linden St., Brookline, Massachusetts
- Coordinates: 42°20′4.76″N 71°7′4.59″W
- Built: 1843
- Architectural style: Greek Revival
- MPS: Brookline MRA
- NRHP reference No.: 85003284
- Added to NRHP: October 17, 1985

19 Linden Street is a historic house located in Brookline, Massachusetts. It is a well-preserved local example of Greek Revival styling, and the best-preserved survivor of a residential subdivision developed in the 1840s.

== Description and history ==
This 2 1/2-story wood-frame house was built in 1843–44. Unlike many Greek Revival houses, it has a side-gable roof, but it has corner pilasters and a single-story porch with Greek columns, and the gable is fully pedimented.

The house was listed on the National Register of Historic Places on October 17, 1985.

== See also ==
- National Register of Historic Places listings in Brookline, Massachusetts
