= Winand Toussaint House =

Historic house in Massachusetts, United States

- U.S. National Register of Historic Places
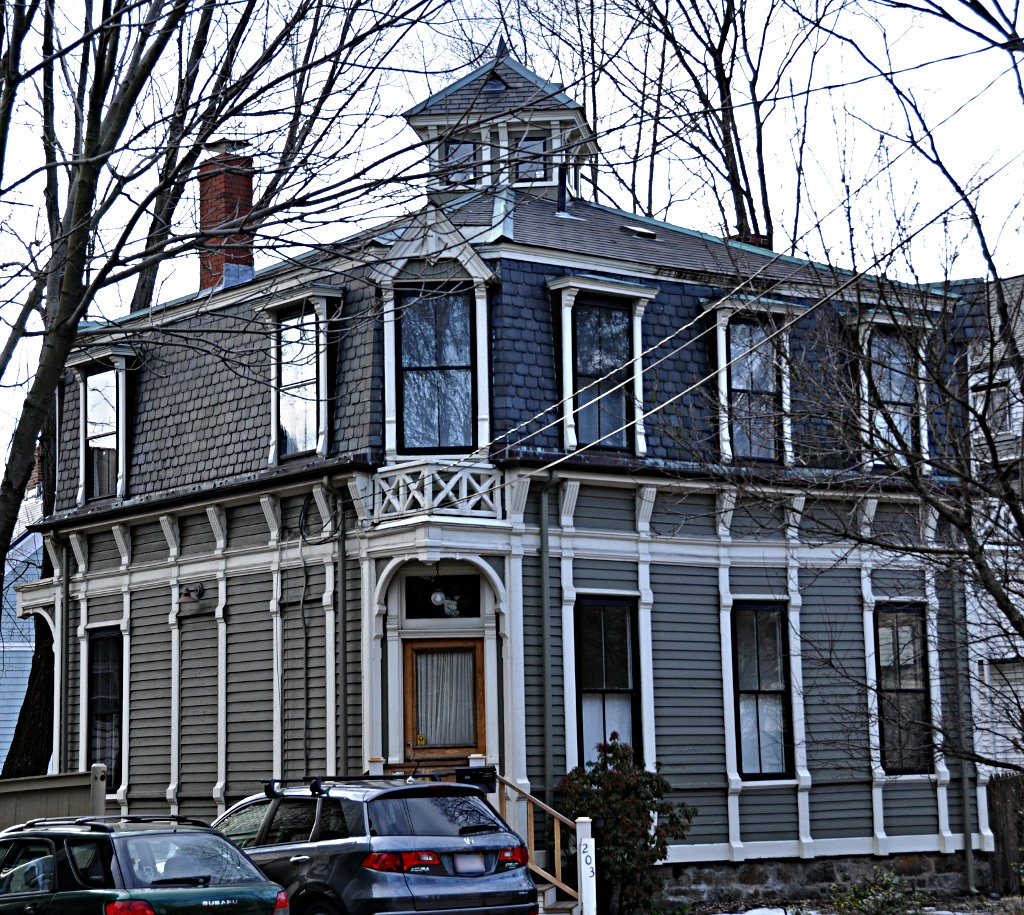

- Location within Massachusetts Location within the United States
- Location: 203 Aspinwall Ave., Brookline, Massachusetts
- Coordinates: 42°20′9″N 71°6′56″W
- Built: 1881
- Architect: Toussaint, Winand
- Architectural style: Second Empire, Stick-Eastlake, Mansard
- MPS: Brookline MRA
- NRHP reference No.: 85003319
- Added to NRHP: October 17, 1985

The Winand Toussaint House is a historic house at 203 Aspinwall Avenue in Brookline, Massachusetts.

== Description and history ==
The 2 1/2-story wood-frame house was built in 1881 by Winand Toussaint, a Belgian immigrant who worked in the furniture business, and may have been the designer of the house. It is an architecturally eclectic work, with elements of Second Empire (the mansard roof), Stick style, and Gothic Revival. The house has a cupola, and perhaps most distinctively, the house's corners are chamfered, with the main entrance at one of the angled ends.

The house was listed on the National Register of Historic Places on October 17, 1985.

== See also ==
- National Register of Historic Places listings in Brookline, Massachusetts
