= Isaac Child House =

Historic house in Massachusetts, United States

- U.S. National Register of Historic Places
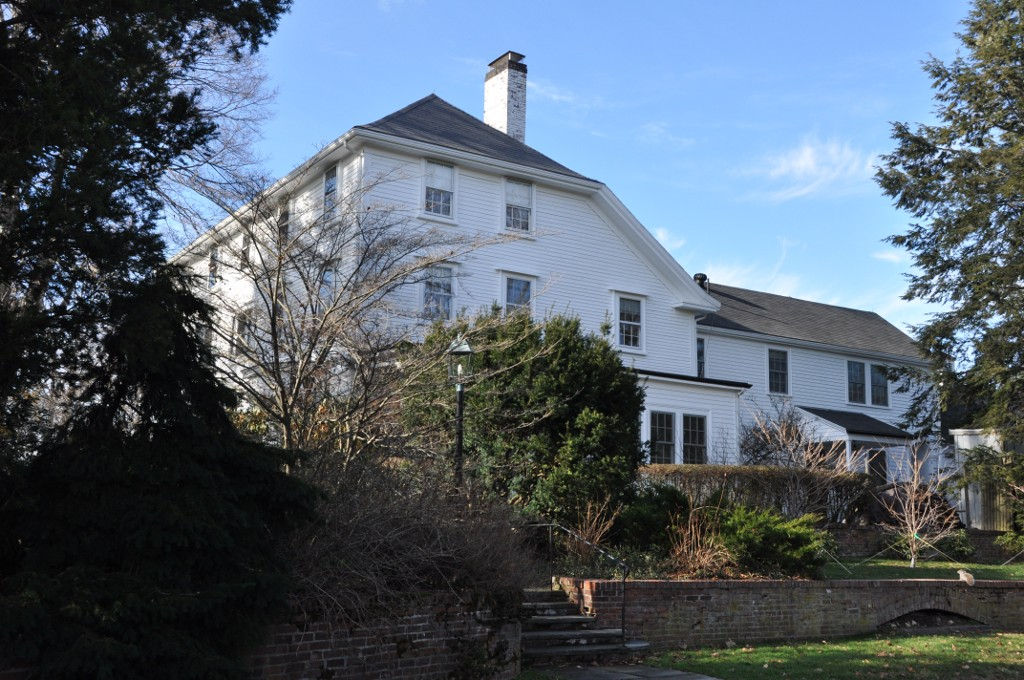

- Location within Massachusetts Location within the United States
- Location: 209 Newton St., Brookline, Massachusetts
- Coordinates: 42°18′38″N 71°8′38″W
- Area: 3.3 acres (1.3 ha)
- Built: c. 1740; 1875
- Architectural style: Colonial
- MPS: Brookline MRA
- NRHP reference No.: 85003254
- Added to NRHP: October 17, 1985

The Isaac Child House is a historic house at 209 Newton Street in Brookline, Massachusetts. With a documented history dating to the 1790s, it is one of Brookline's few surviving 18th-century houses. It was listed on the National Register of Historic Places in 1985.

== Description and history ==
The Isaac Child House is located the suburban residential portion of southern Brookline, at the northwest corner of Newton and Clyde Streets. Its lot of over 3 acres (1.2 ha), surrounded on two sides by The Country Club, has been subdivided and includes three other houses. The house is a 3 1/2-story wood-frame structure, with a gabled roof that has clipped corners. A transverse two-story ell projects to the north (rear), with a single-story ell continuing beyond that.

It is unclear exactly when this house was built; it contains beams that may have been reused from an early 18th century house that was probably in this site, but there is no documentary record of a house here until the 1790s. The land has been in ownership since the mid 17th century, when it belonged to Griffin Bowen. It is surmised that Isaac Child, his grandson, may have built the oldest portion of this house as early as 1714. Its upper floors include heavy timber framing, wide wooden floorboards, and batten doors with strap hinges, all characteristic of First Period construction. The house was extensively altered in the 1870s, literally raising up the old structure and building a new first floor underneath. It has seen only relatively modest alterations since then.

== See also ==
- National Register of Historic Places listings in Brookline, Massachusetts
