= Lynch-O'Gorman House =

Historic house in Massachusetts, United States

- U.S. National Register of Historic Places
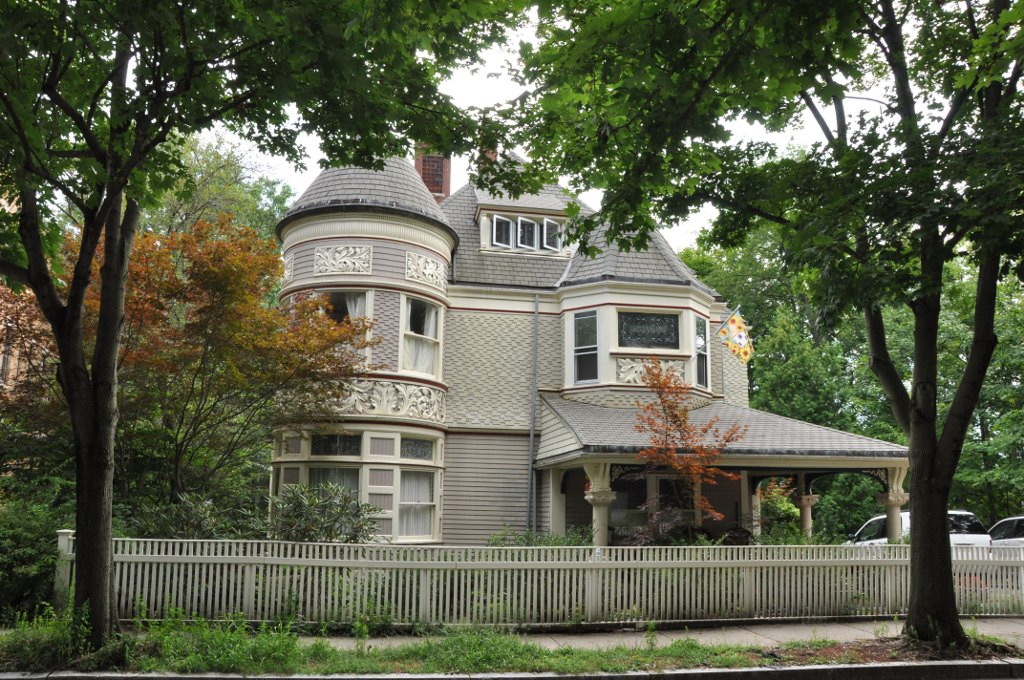

- Location within Massachusetts Location within the United States
- Location: 41 Mason Terr., Brookline, Massachusetts
- Coordinates: 42°20′26″N 71°7′56″W
- Built: 1889
- Architect: Vinal, Arthur
- Architectural style: Queen Anne
- MPS: Brookline MRA
- NRHP reference No.: 85003299
- Added to NRHP: October 17, 1985

The Lynch-O'Gorman House is a historic house at 41 Mason Terrace in Brookline, Massachusetts. Design of this house has been attributed to Arthur Vinal, a prominent area architect; it is an elaborately decorated Queen Anne Victorian that was built in 1889 by Charles Sias on Beacon Street. It was moved to its present location on Mason Terrace in 1903. The house features the typical high-style Queen Anne profusion of shapes and texture.

The house was listed on the National Register of Historic Places in 1985.

== See also ==
- National Register of Historic Places listings in Brookline, Massachusetts
