= Rev. John Orrock House =

Historic house in Massachusetts, United States

- U.S. National Register of Historic Places
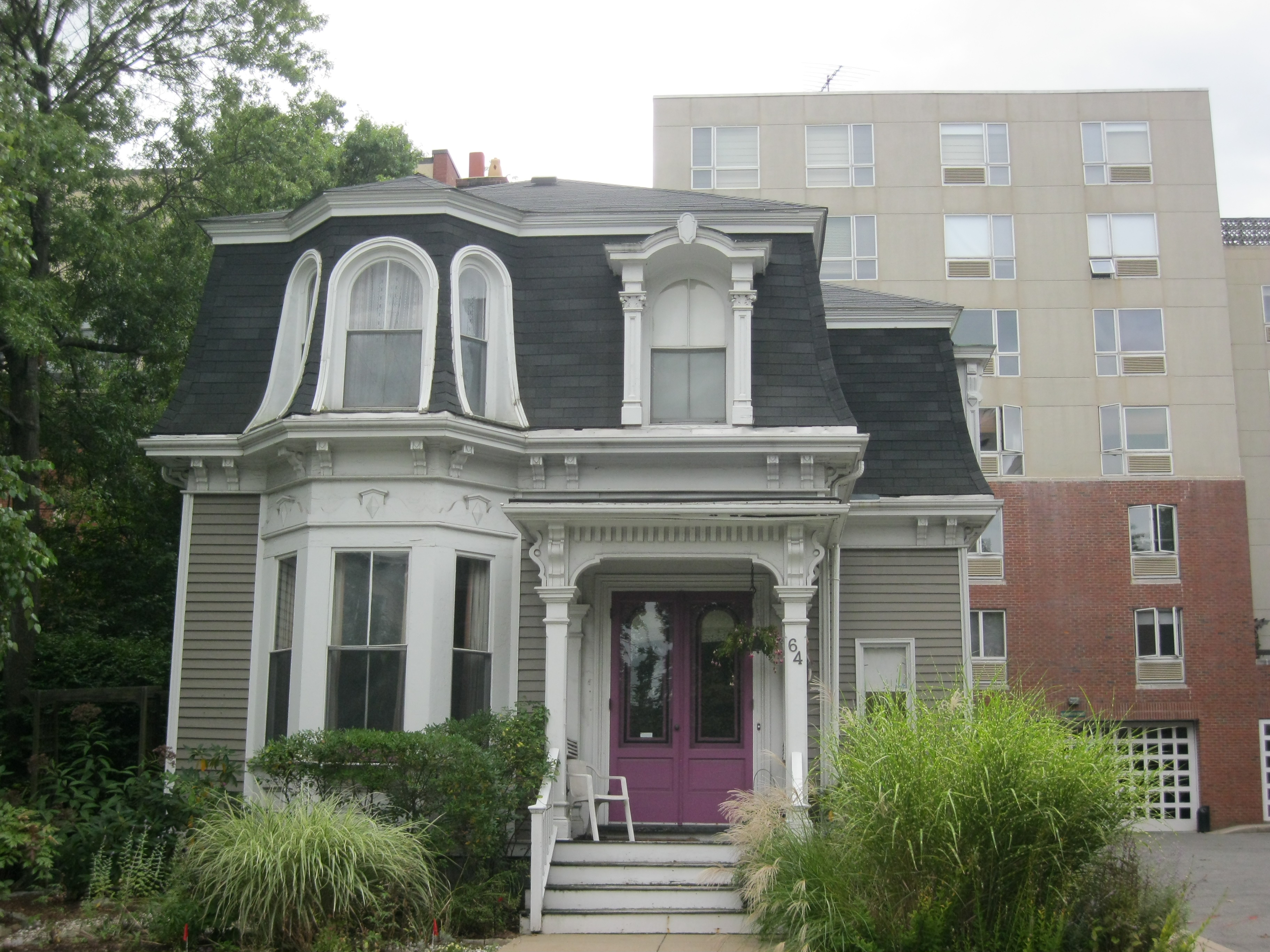

- Location within Massachusetts Location within the United States
- Location: 64 Winchester St., Brookline, Massachusetts
- Coordinates: 42°20′33″N 71°7′51″W
- Built: 1871
- Architectural style: Second Empire, Mansard
- MPS: Brookline MRA
- NRHP reference No.: 85003304
- Added to NRHP: October 17, 1985

The Rev. John Orrock House is a historic house at 64 Winchester Street in Brookline, Massachusetts. It is a two-story wood-frame structure, with tall mansard roof and clapboard siding. The front facade is two bays wide, with a polygonal bay to the left and entrance to the right. The bay extends into the roof line, where there are three round-arch windows. The main door has two leaves, each with round-arch windows, and is sheltered by an ornate porch supported by square posts. The roof line has paired brackets in the cornice. The house was built in 1871 for Rev. John Orrock, editor of the Advent Herald, a religious newspaper.

The house was listed on the National Register of Historic Places in 1985.

== See also ==
- National Register of Historic Places listings in Brookline, Massachusetts
