= Gen. Simon Elliot House =

Historic house in Massachusetts, United States

- U.S. National Register of Historic Places
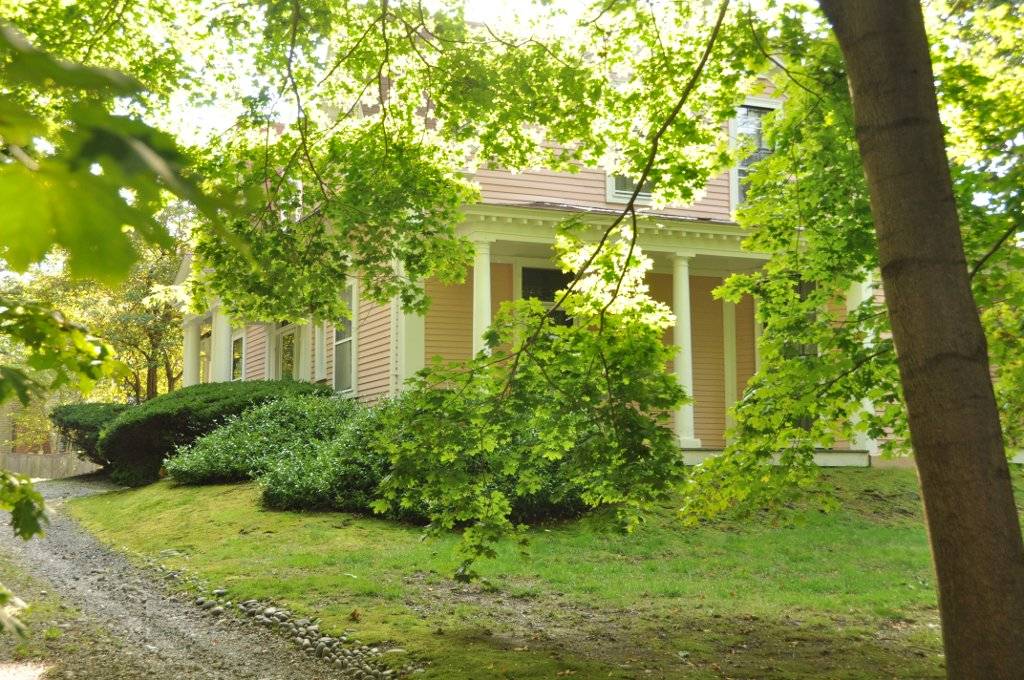

- Location within Massachusetts Location within the United States
- Location: 61 Heath St., Brookline, Massachusetts
- Coordinates: 42°19′29″N 71°8′42″W
- Area: 2.6 acres (1.1 ha)
- Built: 1824
- Architectural style: Greek Revival
- MPS: Brookline MRA
- NRHP reference No.: 85003262
- Added to NRHP: October 17, 1985

The General Simon Elliot House was a historic house at 61 Heath Street in Brookline, Massachusetts. Built in 1824, it was one of the town's oldest examples of Greek Revival architecture, owned by several prominent residents. The house was listed on the National Register of Historic Places on October 17, 1985.

== Description and history ==
The General Simon Elliott House was located on a residential street in Brookline's Woodland-Heath area, at the western corner of Heath Street and Reservoir Road. A low stone wall ran along the street-facing edges of the property. The core of the house was a 1 1/2-story wood frame Greek Revival cottage, with a gabled roof and clapboarded exterior. Although the modern main entrance was on the left side as seen from the street, the original main entrance was on the street-facing south facade, sheltered by a single-story Greek Revival porch. The current main entrance was at the center of the left facade, sheltered by a rectangular Colonial Revival portico. Stylistic alterations to the exterior included Gothic-arched details, steeply pitched gabled dormers, and Colonial Revival window framing.

The house was built in 1824 by General Simon Elliot (1762–1832), a descendant of Scottish immigrants, who served in the American Revolutionary War. Elliot was a prominent local merchant as well as a mill and factory owner, who later served as a Major General in the Massachusetts Militia. Following the revolution, on 13 December 1786, he was appointed by Gov. James Bowdoin as an adjutant in the militia with the rank of captain under the command of General Benjamin Lincoln to put down Shays' Rebellion. He was a Lieutenant Colonel in 1798 when making recommendations on Army appointments. The property was owned by Rosemary Shaw Blake from 1949 until her death in 2021, aged 103, when it was bought by a developer and demolished in late 2023.

It was the oldest Greek Revival house in Brookline until it was demolished.

== See also ==
- National Register of Historic Places listings in Brookline, Massachusetts
