= Emmett Cottage =

Historic house in Massachusetts, United States

- U.S. National Register of Historic Places
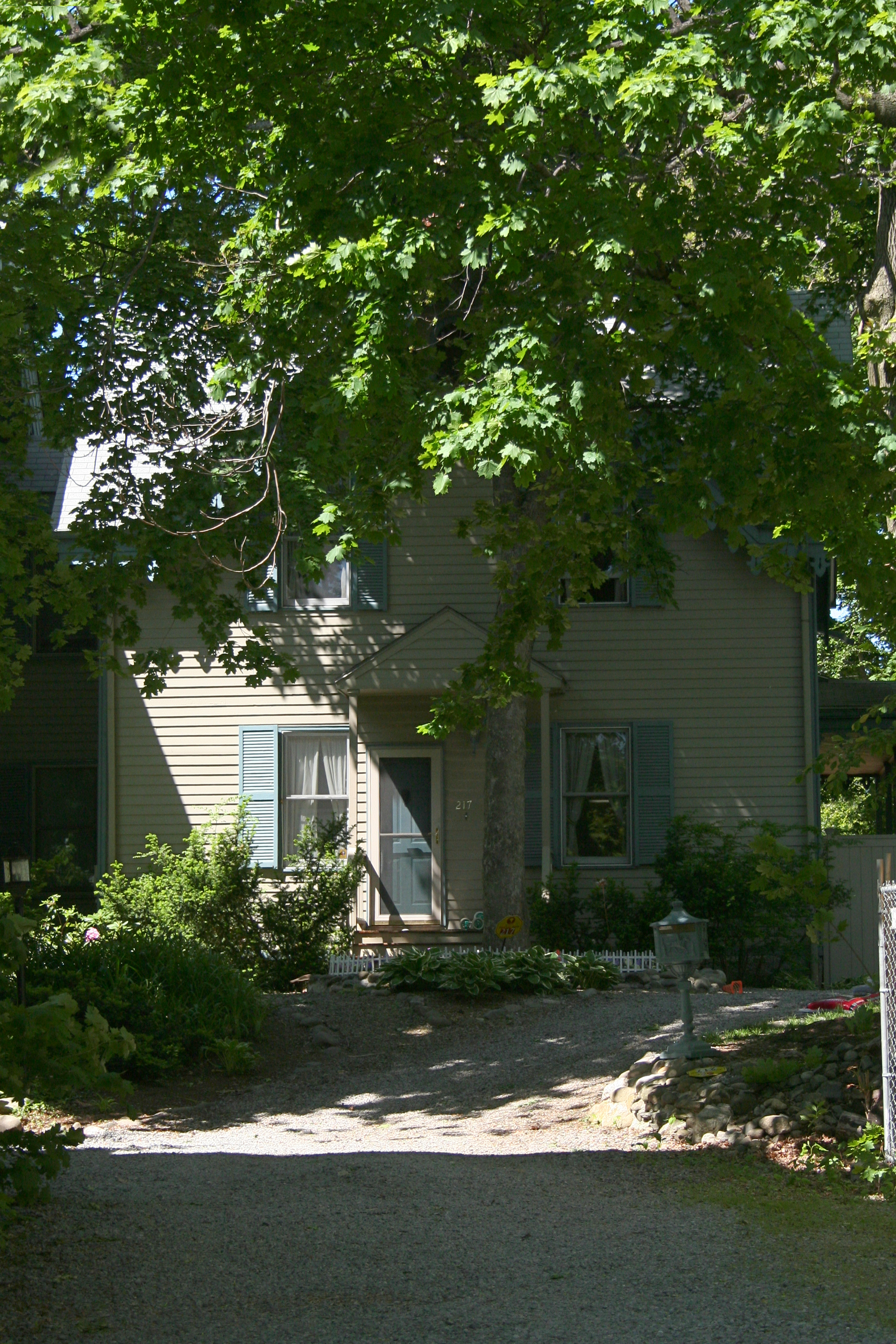

- Location within Massachusetts Location within the United States
- Location: 217 Freeman St., Brookline, Massachusetts
- Coordinates: 42°20′52″N 71°7′13″W
- Area: less than one acre
- Architectural style: Gothic Revival
- MPS: Brookline MRA
- NRHP reference No.: 85003263
- Added to NRHP: October 17, 1985

Emmett Cottage is a historic cottage in Brookline, Massachusetts, directly behind Saint Aidan's Church and Rectory. Of uncertain construction date but stylistically dated to the 1840s, it is a little-altered example of a small Gothic Revival cottage. It was listed on the National Register of Historic Places on October 17, 1985.

== Description and history ==
Emmett Cottage is set well back from the north side of Freeman Street, accessed via a drive shared with 219 Freeman Street and immediately west of Saint Aidan's Church. It is a 1 1/2-story wood frame Gothic Revival structure, with bargeboard decoration in the gables.

The exact location and construction date of this building is not known, since it does not appear on any early maps; its Gothic Revival styling suggests a construction date in the 1840s. It bears some resemblance to extant Gothic Revival gatehouses (more extensively altered than this one) that survive in the area. The lot stood vacant until 1871, when it was reported that an "unfinished house" (possibly just the foundation for this structure) was located here. The lot was originally part of a larger country estate, which was subdivided and first sold in 1855, and was then sold to John Mahoney in 1870. Its name is traditional, but the reason for its name is unknown.

== See also ==
- National Register of Historic Places listings in Brookline, Massachusetts
