= House at 53 Linden Street =

Historic house in Massachusetts, United States

- U.S. National Register of Historic Places
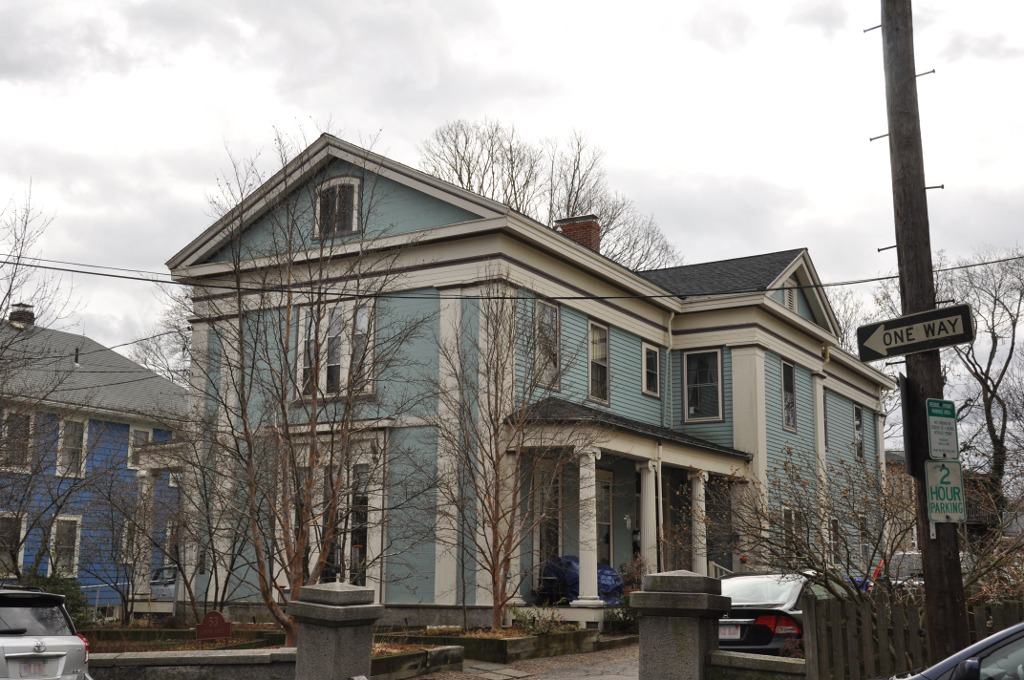

- Location within Massachusetts Location within the United States
- Location: 53 Linden St., Brookline, Massachusetts
- Coordinates: 42°20′4.22″N 71°6′58.82″W
- Built: 1843
- Architectural style: Greek Revival, Italianate
- MPS: Brookline MRA
- NRHP reference No.: 85003291
- Added to NRHP: October 17, 1985

The House at 53 Linden Street in Brookline, Massachusetts, is a well-preserved local example of transitional Greek Revival-Italianate styling. The 2 1/2-story wood-frame house was built c. 1843–44 by John Faxon. It has a pedimented gable front with pilasters, but is L-shaped and has round-arch windows in its gables, both Italianate features. It is one of four surviving Greek Revival houses in the neighborhood, which was developed beginning in 1840.

The house was listed on the National Register of Historic Places in 1985.

== See also ==
- National Register of Historic Places listings in Brookline, Massachusetts
