= White Place Historic District (Massachusetts) =

Historic district in Massachusetts, United States

- U.S. National Register of Historic Places
- U.S. Historic district
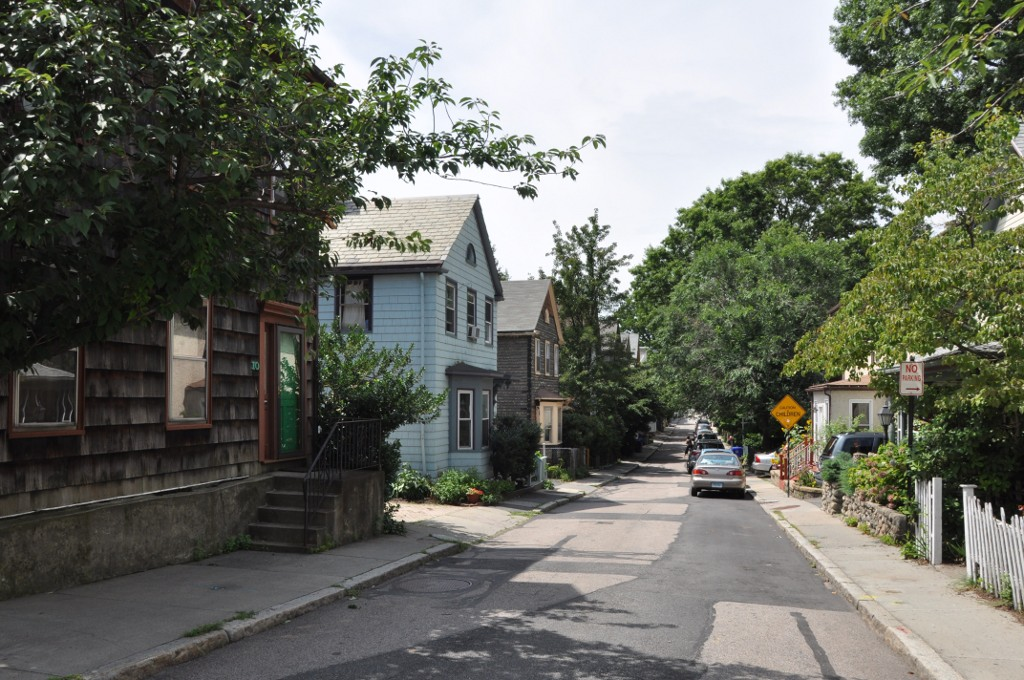

- Location within Massachusetts Location within the United States
- Location: White Pl. between Washington St. and Davis Path, Brookline, Massachusetts
- Coordinates: 42°19′22″N 71°7′10″W
- Area: 4 acres (1.6 ha)
- Architectural style: Mixed (more Than 2 Styles From Different Periods)
- MPS: Brookline MRA
- NRHP reference No.: 85003243
- Added to NRHP: October 17, 1985

The White Place Historic District is a historic district on White Place between Washington Street and Davis Path in Brookline, Massachusetts. White Place contains the town's highest concentration of vernacular 19th-century architecture, with 36 houses built between c. 1835 and 1905. Most of these are single-story or 1 1/2-story cottages, which were built before 1866, and exhibit elements of Italianate styling, derived either from the time of their construction, or through later alteration. There are seven triple decker apartment houses, which were built between about 1895 and 1905.

The district was listed on the National Register of Historic Places in 1985.

== See also ==
- National Register of Historic Places listings in Brookline, Massachusetts
