= House at 44 Stanton Road =

Historic house in Massachusetts, United States

- U.S. National Register of Historic Places
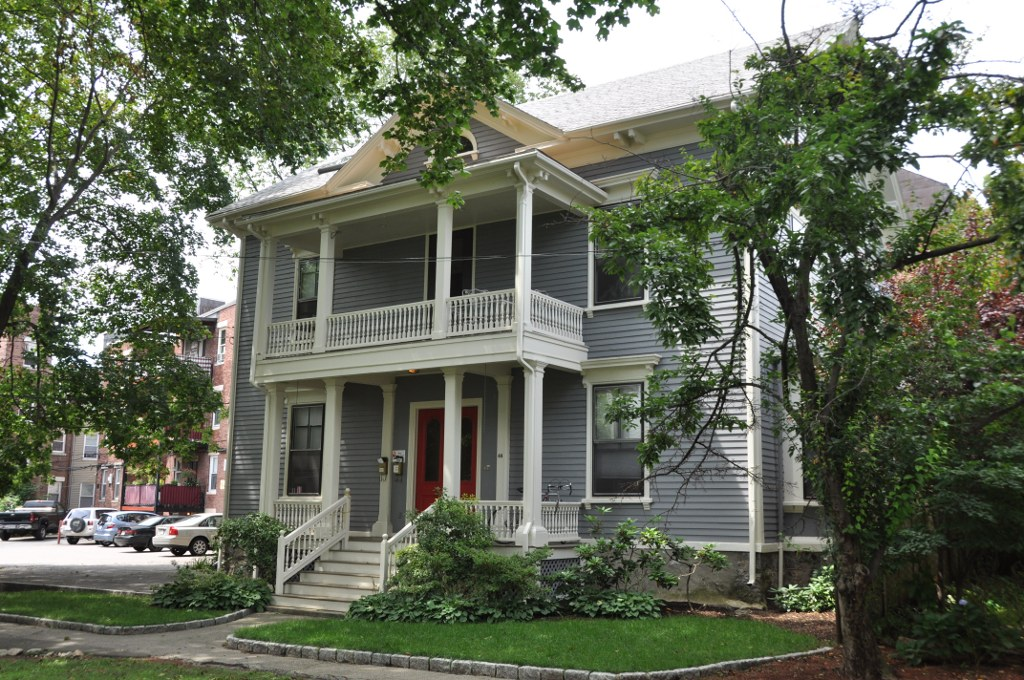

- Location within Massachusetts Location within the United States
- Location: 44 Stanton Rd., Brookline, Massachusetts
- Coordinates: 42°20′2″N 71°7′37″W
- Built: 1864
- Architectural style: Italianate
- MPS: Brookline MRA
- NRHP reference No.: 85003289
- Added to NRHP: October 17, 1985

The House at 44 Stanton Road in Brookline, Massachusetts, is a well-preserved local example of Italianate architecture, and is one of four houses of that style on Stanton Road. The 2 1/2-story wood-frame house was built c. 1864–65 by James Edmonds. It has deep eaves with paired brackets, a small centered gable on the front facade, and bracketed windows. Its full height front porch is probably a later addition. It was moved a short distance to its present location in 1901.

The house was listed on the National Register of Historic Places in 1985.

== See also ==
- National Register of Historic Places listings in Brookline, Massachusetts
