= Charles Heath House =

Historic house in Massachusetts, United States

- U.S. National Register of Historic Places
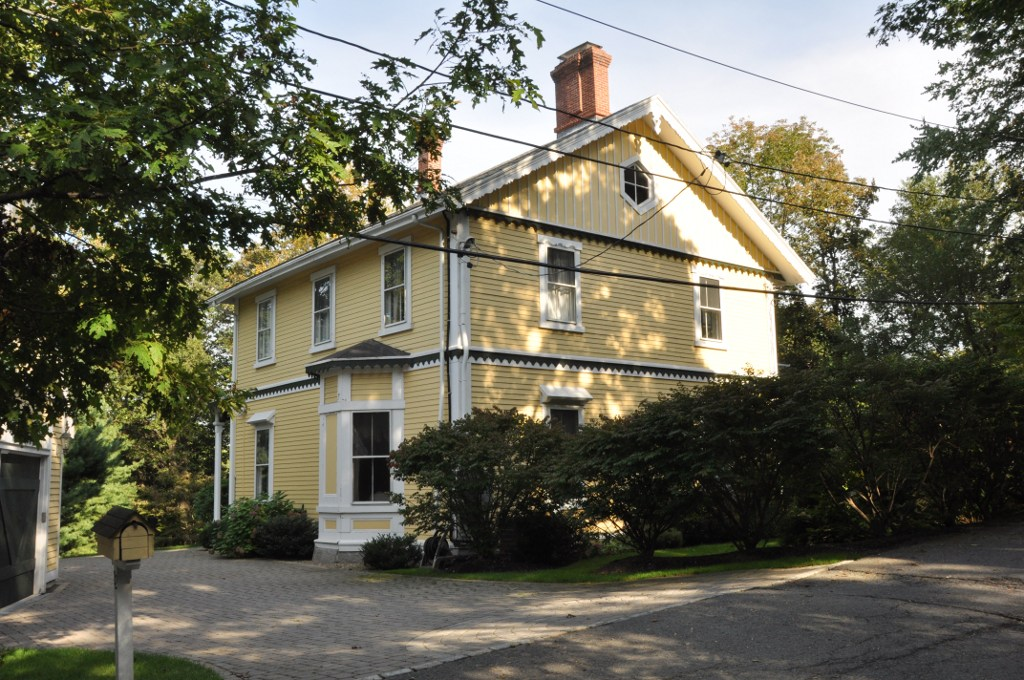

- Location within Massachusetts Location within the United States
- Location: 12 Heath Hill, Brookline, Massachusetts
- Coordinates: 42°19′33″N 71°8′34″W
- Built: 1855
- Architectural style: Carpenter Gothic
- MPS: Brookline MRA
- NRHP reference No.: 85003273
- Added to NRHP: October 17, 1985

The Charles Heath House is a historic house at 12 Heath Hill in Brookline, Massachusetts. The 2 1/2-story wood-frame house was built c. 1855–56 by Charles Heath, a member of one of Brookline's wealthiest families of the 19th century. The house is architecturally eclectic, with elements of the Carpenter Gothic predominating. Its main gable end is sheathed in vertical boarding, and has an oculus window. The gable has bargeboard decoration, as do the horizontal trimlines above the first and second floors. Its first-floor windows have classic Gothic-style hoods.

The house was listed on the National Register of Historic Places in 1985.

== See also ==
- National Register of Historic Places listings in Brookline, Massachusetts
