= Benjamin White House (Brookline, Massachusetts) =

Historic house in Massachusetts, United States

- U.S. National Register of Historic Places
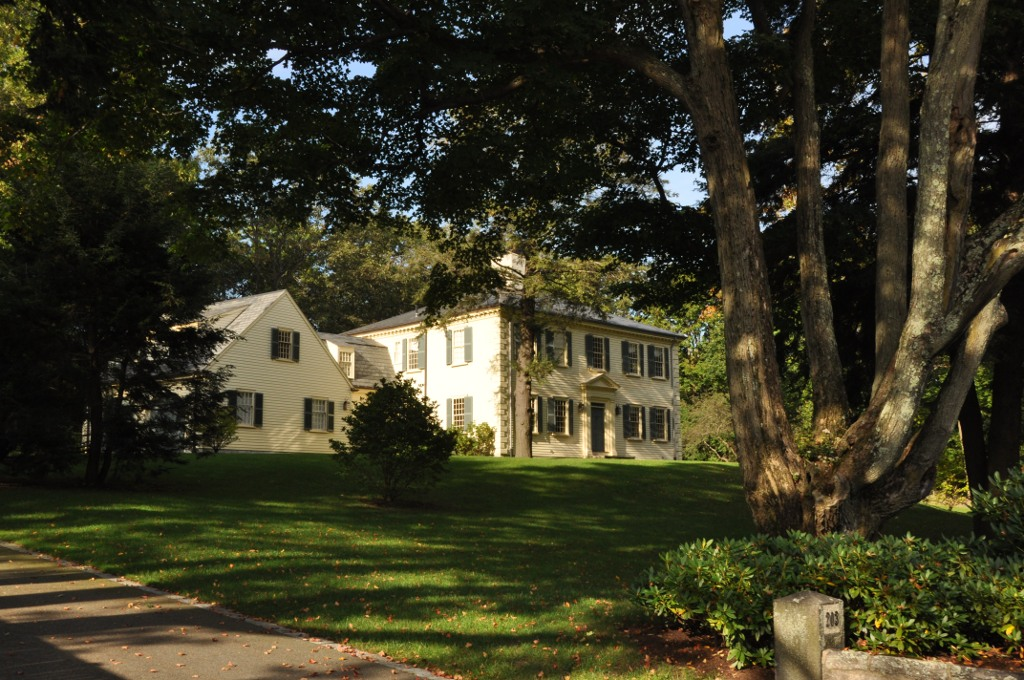

- Location within Massachusetts Location within the United States
- Location: 203 Heath St., Brookline, Massachusetts
- Coordinates: 42°19′20″N 71°8′58″W
- Architectural style: Georgian, Federal
- MPS: Brookline MRA
- NRHP reference No.: 85003242
- Added to NRHP: October 17, 1985

The Benjamin White House is a historic house at 203 Heath Street in Brookline, Massachusetts. Built in 1790, this two-story wood-frame house is one of the oldest on Heath Street. It has been moved twice: once when the Cabot family established a large estate in the area, at which time they moved it back from Heath Street and added a barn, and again in 1947, when the barn was demolished and the house moved onto its foundation. Much of the interior finish was lost during interior remodelling in the 1940s, but the exterior has retained much of its 18th and 19th century trim.

The house was listed on the National Register of Historic Places in 1985.

== See also ==
- National Register of Historic Places listings in Brookline, Massachusetts
