= Milestone (Brookline, Massachusetts) =

- U.S. National Register of Historic Places
- The milestone in 1940
- Location: Boylston St., Brookline, Massachusetts
- Coordinates: 42.32852°N 71.13305°W
- Built: 1810
- MPS: Brookline MRA
- NRHP reference No.: 85003300
- Added to NRHP: October 17, 1985

The Milestone is a historic milestone on Boylston Street (Massachusetts Route 9) in Brookline, Massachusetts. It was laid in 1810 and added to the National Register of Historic Places in 1985.
