= House at 83 Penniman Place =

Historic house in Massachusetts, United States

- U.S. National Register of Historic Places
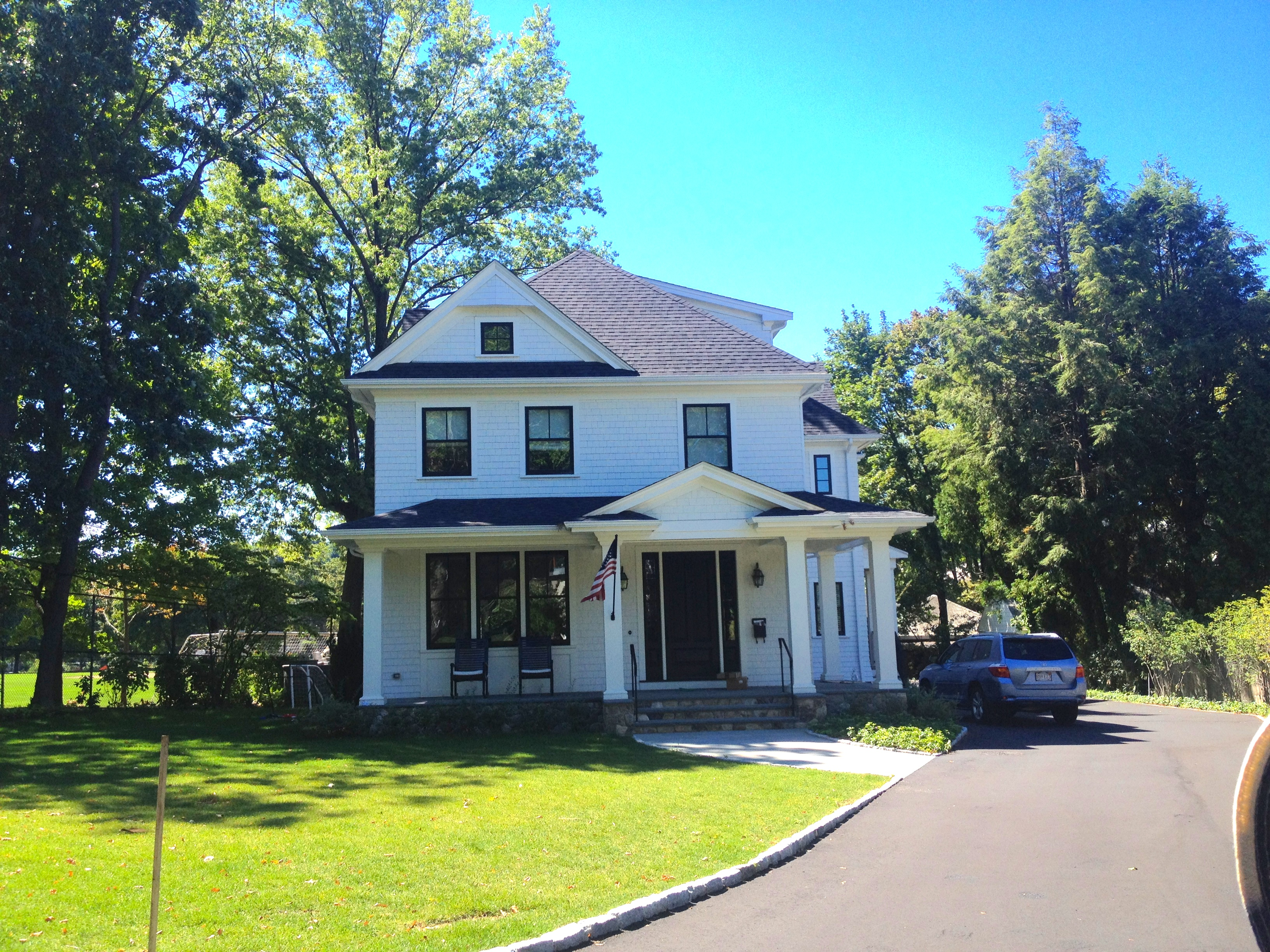
- Site view in 2014. Historic building was demolished.

- Location within Massachusetts
- Location: 83 Penniman Pl., Brookline, Massachusetts
- Coordinates: 42°19′54″N 71°8′54″W
- Built: 1837
- Architectural style: Greek Revival
- MPS: Brookline MRA
- NRHP reference No.: 85003292
- Added to NRHP: October 17, 1985

The House at 83 Penniman Place in Brookline, Massachusetts was a rare early example of Greek Revival styling.

== Description and history ==
The 2 1/2-story wood-frame house was built by Daniel Sanderson sometime between 1830, when Sanderson purchased the land, and 1837, when it was listed on the tax rolls. It had strong Greek Revival features, including a fully pedimented gable, pilastered cornerboards, a wide entablature, and a classic side-hall entry with sidelights and pilasters.

The house was listed on National Register of Historic Places in 1985; it was damaged by fire and torn down in 2009.

The replacement house was completed in 2013. It was designed by Mckay Architects in accordance with national preservation restriction agreements in order to protect the historical character of the property. The preservation restrictions run with the land in perpetuity. The exterior features of the replacement house are compatible in size, scale, massing, exterior construction materials, location and architectural details of the original Sanderson House.

== See also ==
- National Register of Historic Places listings in Brookline, Massachusetts
