= St. Aidan's Church (Brookline, Massachusetts) =

Historic church in Massachusetts, United States

- Saint Aidan's Church and Rectory
- U.S. National Register of Historic Places
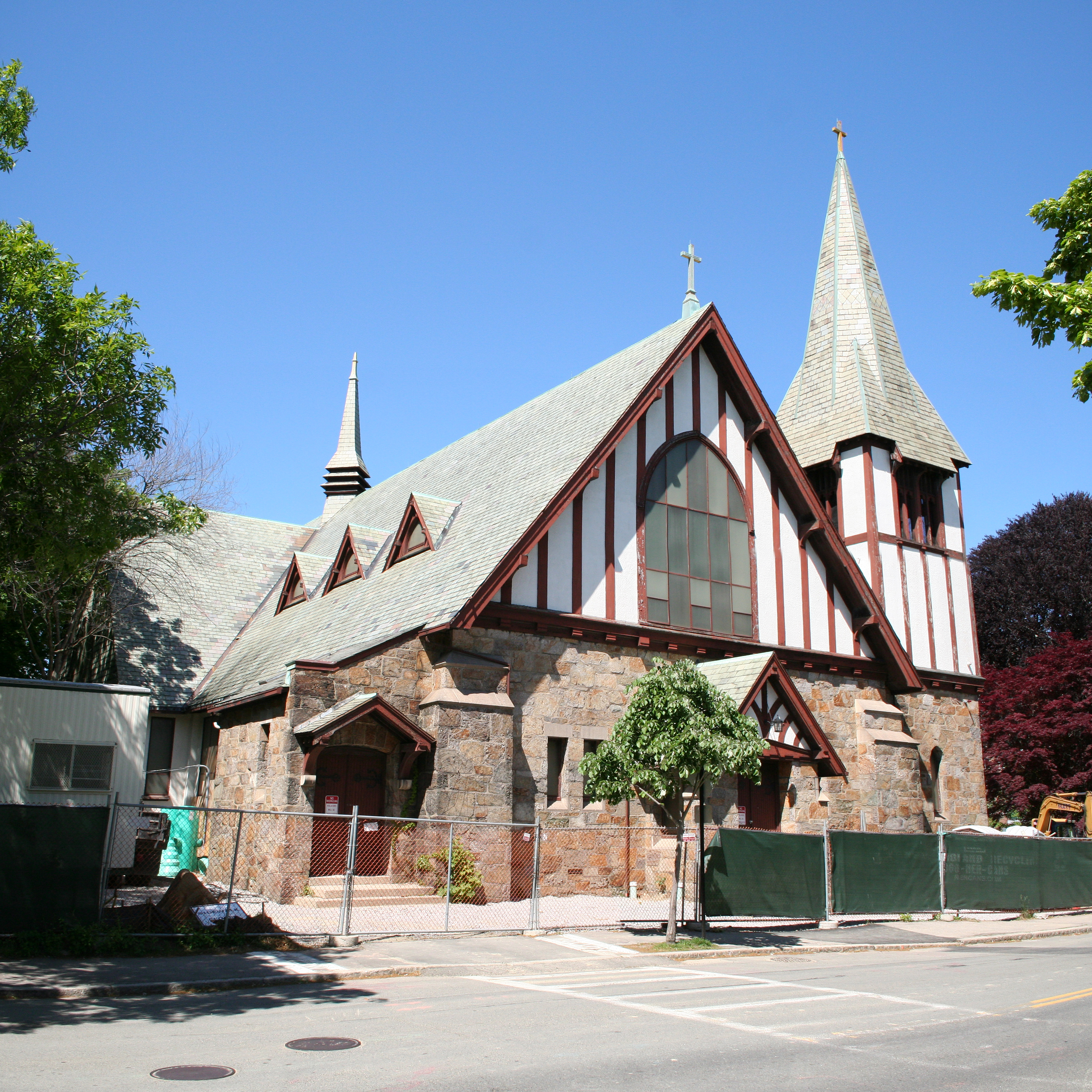

- Location within Massachusetts Location within the United States
- Location: Brookline, Massachusetts
- Coordinates: 42°20′51″N 71°7′11″W
- Built: 1850
- Architect: Maginnis and Walsh
- Architectural style: Tudor Revival
- MPS: Brookline MRA
- NRHP reference No.: 85003310
- Added to NRHP: October 17, 1985

Saint Aidan's Church and Rectory is a historic Catholic church complex in Brookline, Massachusetts. The stuccoed church, located at 224-210 Freeman Street, was designed by Maginnis & Walsh, a noted designer of ecclesiastical buildings, in the Medieval (Tudor) Revival style, and was built in 1911. It was Brookline's third Catholic parish, after Saint Mary's and Saint Lawrence. The church is notable as the parish which was attended by Joseph P. Kennedy and his family when they were living on Beals Street; it was the site of the baptism of both John F. Kennedy and Robert F. Kennedy. The rectory, located at 158 Pleasant Street, was built c. 1850-55 by Edward G. Parker, a Boston lawyer. It was acquired by the church in 1911, and restyled to match the church in 1920.

The complex was listed on the National Register of Historic Places in 1985. The church was closed in 1999, and converted to housing.

== See also ==
- National Register of Historic Places listings in Brookline, Massachusetts
