= Edward Devotion House =

Historic house in Massachusetts, United States

- U.S. National Register of Historic Places
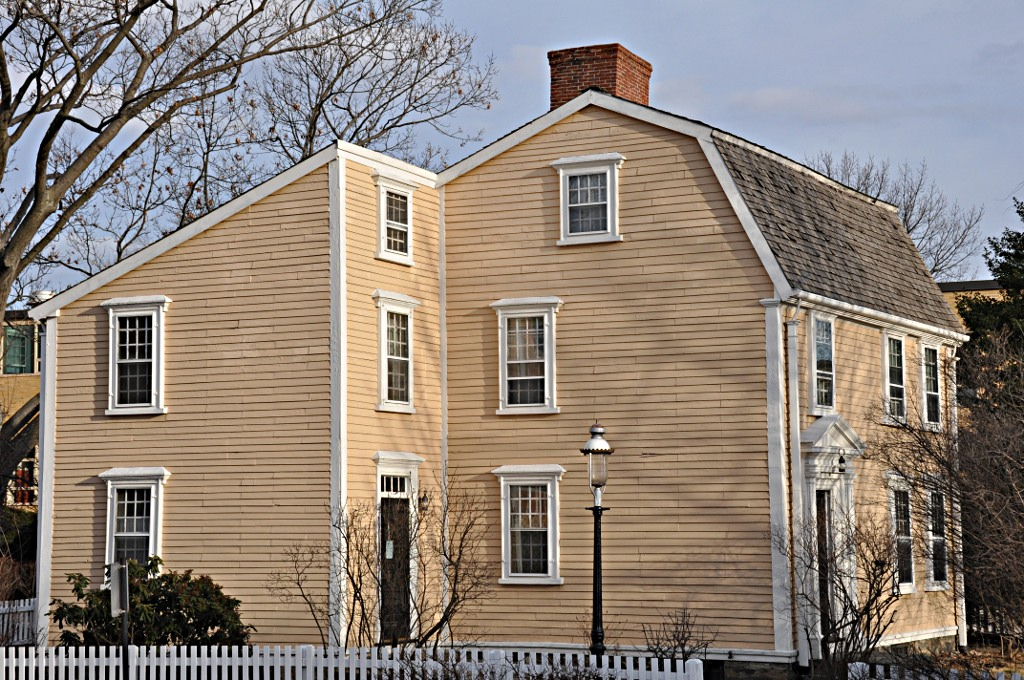

- Location within Greater Boston area
- Location: 347 Harvard St., Brookline, Massachusetts
- Coordinates: 42°20′39″N 71°7′29″W
- Built: 1745
- Architectural style: Colonial
- NRHP reference No.: 78002835
- Added to NRHP: February 14, 1978

The Edward Devotion House is a historic house at 347 Harvard Street in Brookline, Massachusetts, USA. Built about 1745, it is one of the town's few surviving 18th-century structures, and is of those the best preserved. The house is owned by the town and administered by the Brookline Historical Society as a historic house museum. It was listed on the National Register of Historic Places in 1978.

The building is also the headquarters of the Brookline Historical Society.

== Description and history ==
The Edward Devotion House is located on the north side of Harvard Street, a major north–south roadway dating back to early colonial days. It is set west of Coolidge Corner, one of Brookline's major commercial centers, and is nearly surrounded by the Florida Ruffin Ridley School, a public elementary school formerly named for Devotion. The house is a 2 1/2-story wood-frame structure, three bays wide, with a gambrel roof that is extended at the rear by a leanto section, which extends beyond the left facade in a "Beverly jog". It has a brick central chimney, and entrances in the left bay of the main facade and in the jog. The main facade entrance is flanked by pilasters and topped by an entablature and triangular pediment.

The house was built about 1745 by Solomon Hill on land he had purchased from Edward Devotion, Jr., that had been in his family since at least 1645. The house appears to have been built around, or contain elements of, an older structure dating to about 1680. The Devotion family was long prominent in Brookline civic affairs, petitioning for the town's separation from Boston. Edward Devotion, Jr. bequeathed funds to the town for the construction of a school, which the town did not act on until 1891, when the town purchased the house and built the first schoolhouse nearby.

The house has been maintained by the Brookline Historical Society since its founding in 1901, and now displays objects of Brookline history and the Devotion family.

== See also ==
- National Register of Historic Places listings in Brookline, Massachusetts
