= Ebenezer Heath House =

Historic house in Massachusetts, United States

- U.S. National Register of Historic Places
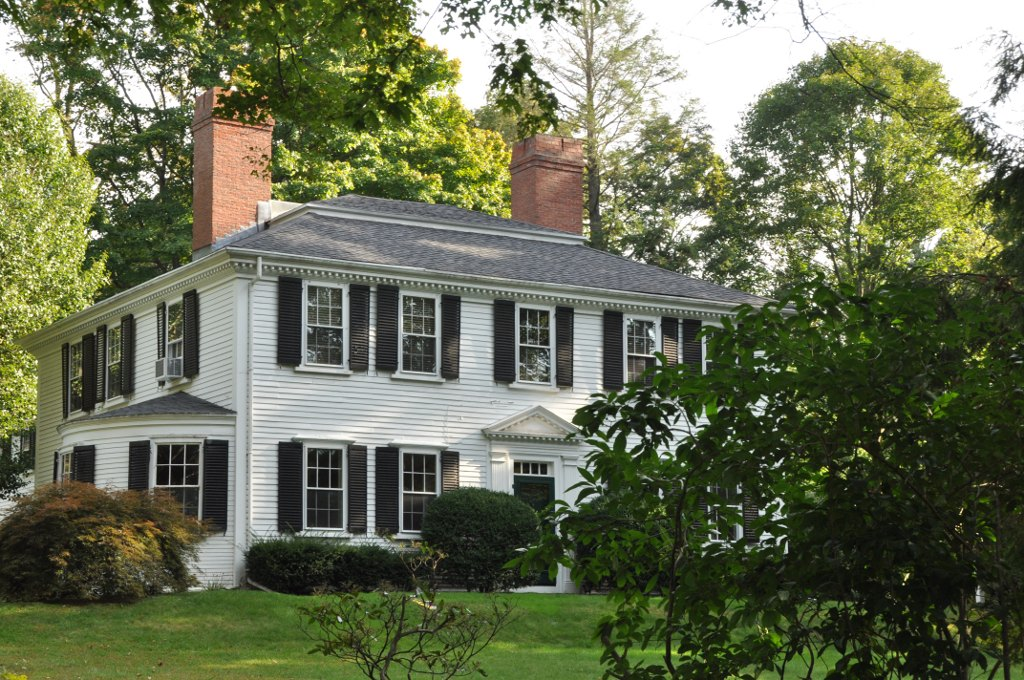

- Location within Massachusetts Location within the United States
- Location: 30 Heath St., Brookline, Massachusetts
- Coordinates: 42°19′31″N 71°8′36″W
- Built: 1791
- Architectural style: Georgian, Federal
- MPS: Brookline MRA
- NRHP reference No.: 85003274
- Added to NRHP: October 17, 1985

The Ebenezer Heath House is a historic house at 30 Heath Street in Brookline, Massachusetts. The two-story wood-frame house was built in 1794 by John Heath for his son Ebenezer and daughter-in-law Hannah (Williams) Heath. The Heaths were related to the Sewall family, who were major local landowners in the 18th century. The house is five bays wide, with a hip roof pierced by a pair of chimneys behind the center roofline. The main entrance is flanked by pilasters, and topped by a four-light transom window and dentillated triangular pediment.

The house was listed on the National Register of Historic Places in 1985.

== See also ==
- National Register of Historic Places listings in Brookline, Massachusetts
- Susannah Heath, diarist and daughter of Ebenezer Heath
