= Freedberg =

Freedberg is a surname. Notable people with the surname include:

- David Freedberg, art historian
- Irwin Freedberg (c. 1933–2005), American professor of dermatology
- Sydney Joseph Freedberg (1914–1997), American art historian
