= Putterham School =

Historic school building in Massachusetts, United States

Coordinates: 42°18′44.25″N 71°08′02.66″W

- U.S. Historic district – Contributing property
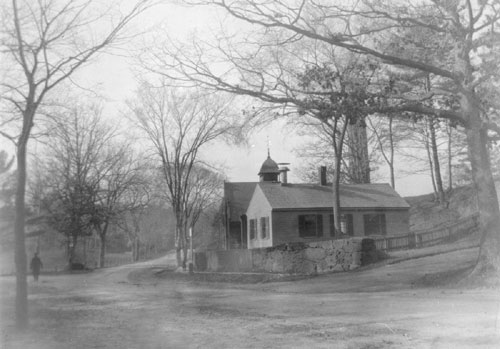
- Putterham School at its original location, winter circa 1907
- Location: Brookline, Massachusetts
- Built: 1768
- Part of: Larz Anderson Park Historic District (ID85003245)
- MPS: Brookline MRA
- Added to NRHP: October 17, 1985

Putterham School, built 1768, is a one room schoolhouse in Brookline, Massachusetts. Originally built at the juncture of Grove and Newton Streets, in 1966 the school was moved from its original site to its present location at Larz Anderson Park.

== Use ==
The Colonial American structure served as a schoolhouse for many generations, but the original name of the school is uncertain. There is evidence that the schoolhouse also served as a house of worship twice in the 20th century: in 1938 as a Catholic church, and sometime after World War II as a synagogue.

Florence Palmer Peabody (1890-1980), chair of the Putterham School Committee of the Brookline Historical Society and a student at the Putterham School in the late 1890s, wrote an article entitled "When I Went to School" that appeared in the 1960 Proceedings of the Brookline Historical Society. In that article she presents the following account of her research:

"The building was one room, with a huge barrel stove in the back. The iron chimney ran along under most of the length of the ceiling before turning at right angles to go through the roof. Still nearer the front of the room, a huge ventilator pierced the roof and ceiling, which must have made the temperature around the teachers desk a bit more comfortable than it had been before its installation. This school was originally built, according to school records, in 1768, although as early as 1713 permission was given to the residents of the south part of the town to build themselves a school house. In 1768, help in the building was offered and a teacher assigned. In 1839, it was enlarged. For 1854, I find this paragraph: 'The Newton street house is large enough for the very small school it now contains; but the ceiling is so low, and the building so ill ventilated, that it Is unhealthy even for that small number. Justice to that district requires that an appropriation should be voted, sufficient to defray the expense of raising the roof, and also of providing it with comfortable modern desks and chairs, in place of the uneasy plank structures on which the children now sit.'" "This suggested work seems to have been done, as in the following year we read: 'The ceiling has been raised eighteen inches; the windows have been enlarged; and the old uncomfortable desks and tables have been replaced by some which were formerly used in the schools in the Town Hall.' I think the school, as I remember it, was about as these changes left it. We entered through a short, narrow hallway at the back of the school. This hall had hooks for clothes on one side and a shelf on the other, on one end of which was kept a large bucket of fresh water for drinking purposes. This was brought over from the high service pumping station next door each morning, Mr. Webber, engineer there, being the janitor for the little school. He was in league with Miss Hyde, I am sure, to make our days in that school some of the happiest and most worthwhile of any of our school days. Rudimentary sanitation was attempted. Each pupil was required to have an individual drinking cup. Wood for the huge stove was kept outside in a sort of closet in the hall, west of the entrance. If the day's supply which was left in the morning beside the stove gave out, the older boys could renew it. Then, still further along at the end of the hall, was our one out-of-door facility. Another was added during the years I was there."

== Alterations ==
As mentioned, the school has been altered several times since its construction in the 18th century. The original one-room design was enlarged in 1840 by with a rear addition. A foyer was added in 1847 for storing coal or wood. In 1855, the ceiling in the schoolroom was raised, the windows were enlarged, and the desks and chairs were repaired. A double privy was built around 1898, probably replacing an earlier single privy.

== The move ==
The Brookline Board of Selectmen and the Brookline Historical Society worked in conjunction with Race Architectural Restoration Enterprises, Inc. (R.A.R.E., Inc.) to successfully accomplish the task of moving the delicate, historically important structure. The project took years of planning and preparation prior to the actual move.

The building was reset on a solid stone foundation. The windows were outfitted with genuine antique glass. Structural repairs were made to counter the effects of two centuries of deterioration. The red paint that currently adorns the building was blended to match the originally shade revealed by paint scrapings.

== Today ==
Today the Brookline Historical Society maintains Putterham School as an educational museum displaying books, teaching aids, schoolroom equipment and other articles of historical interest.

From June until October, the school is open from noon until 3 pm on the second and fourth Sundays of each month. Members of the Brookline Historical Society will also open the museum by appointment for school groups and other visitors.

== Gallery ==
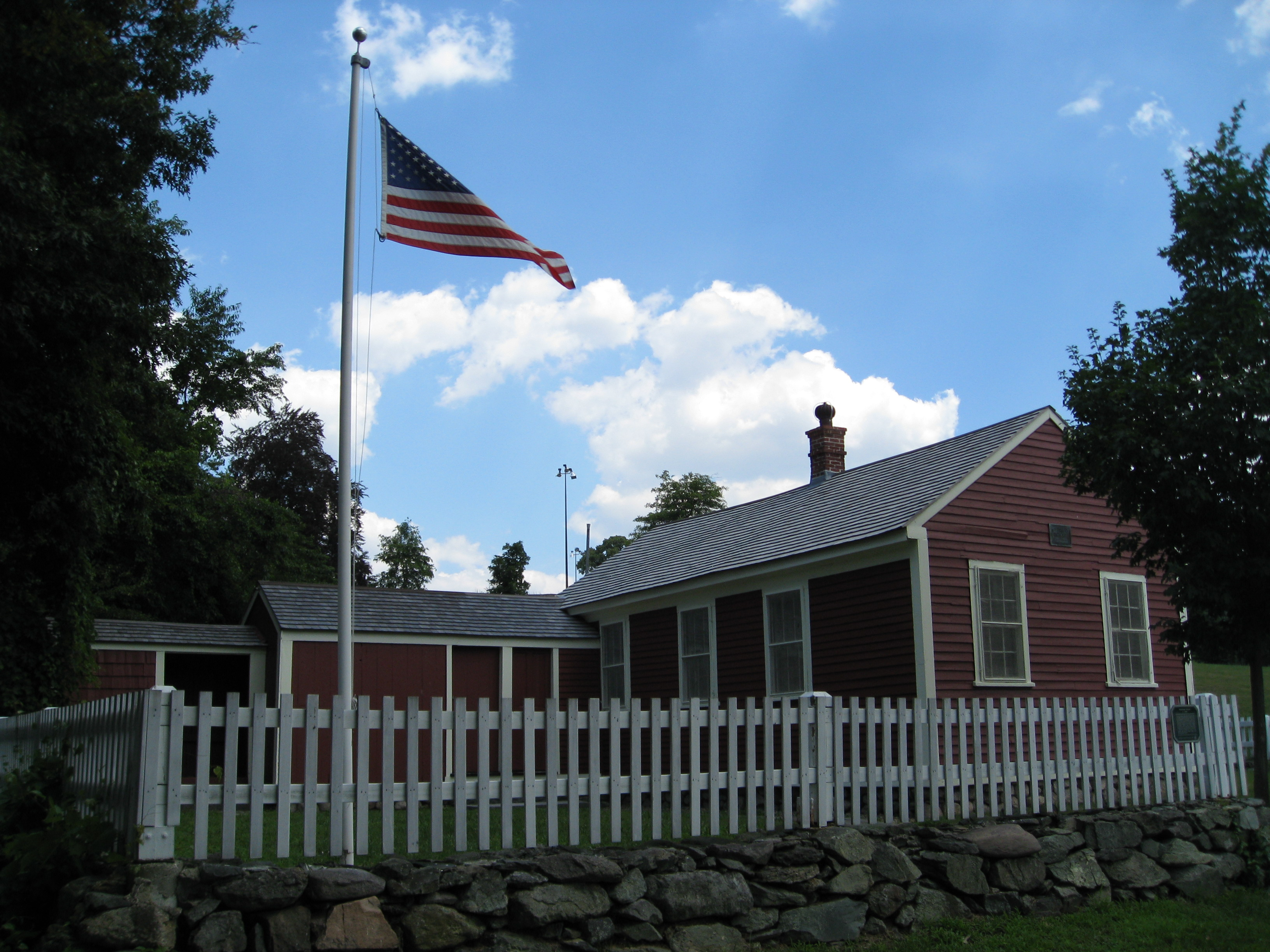
The school in 2008

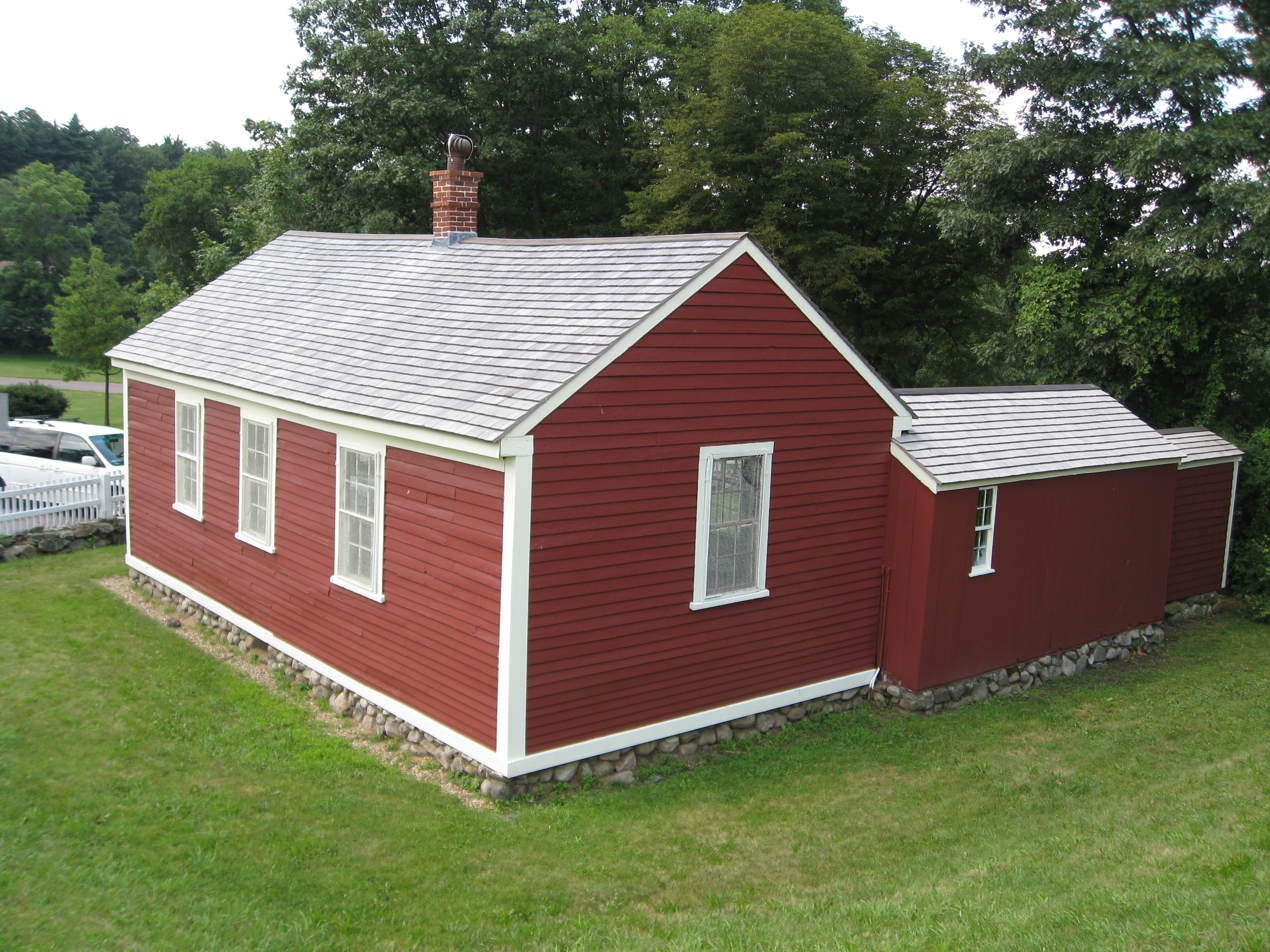
Rear view

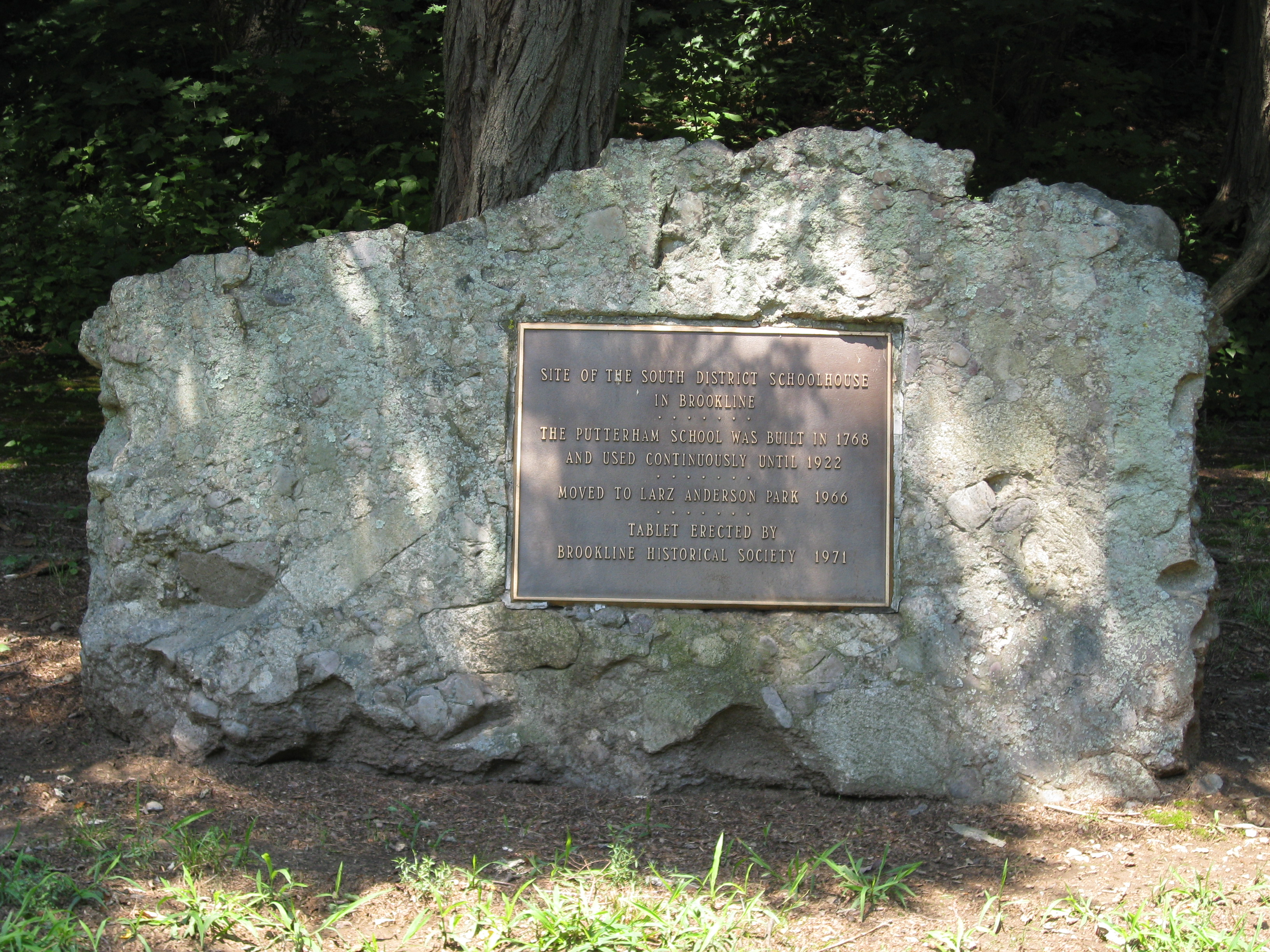
Original site

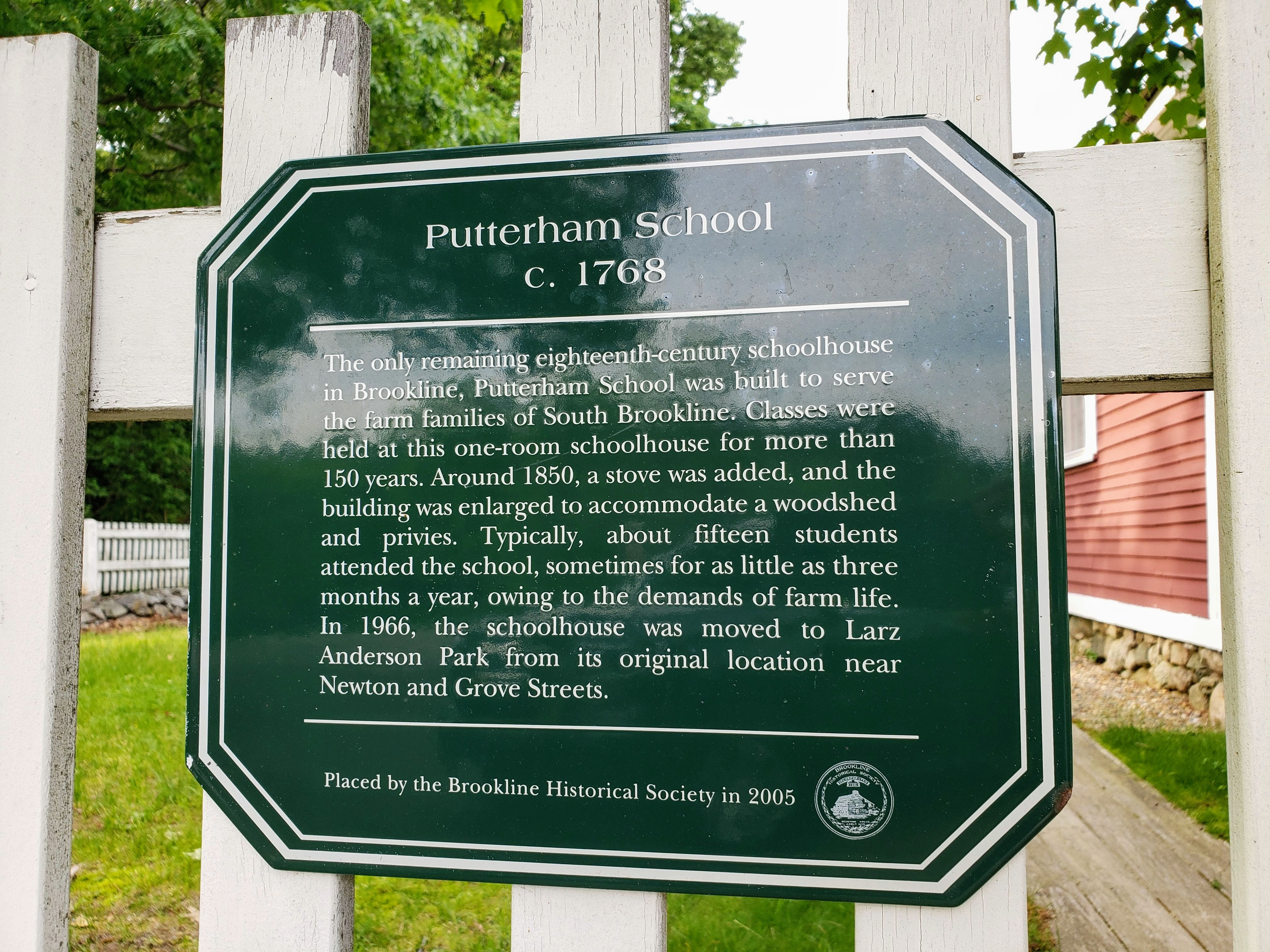

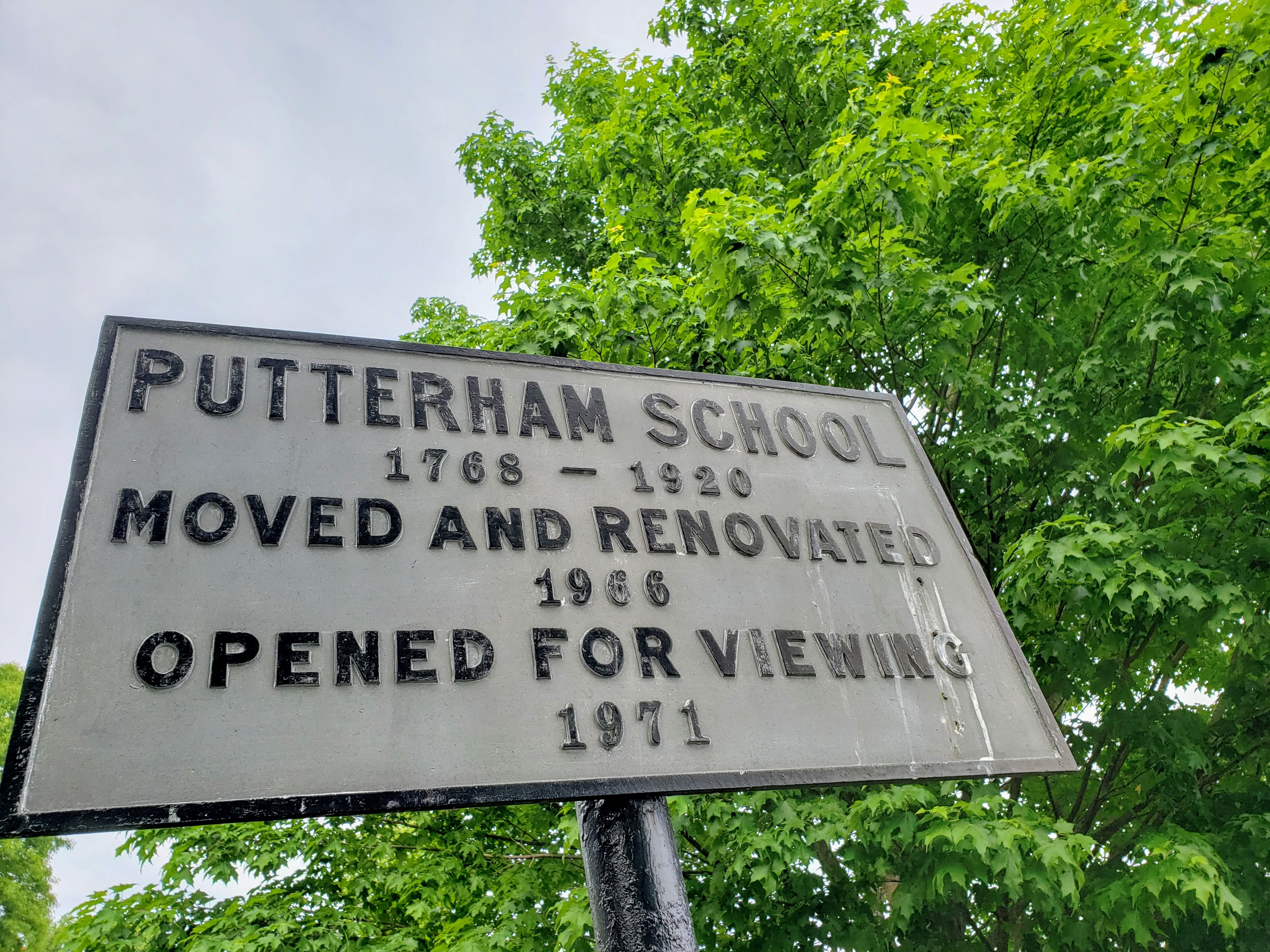

=== References ===
- Brookline Historical Society
