= Isabella Howland =

American painter and sculptor

Isabella Howland (1895–1974) was an American painter, sculptor, and caricaturist.

Born in Brookline, Massachusetts, Howland was associated with Maine for much her career; she also lived and worked in New York City. Several of her works are owned by the Whitney Museum of American Art, and she is also represented in the collection of the Ogunquit Museum of American Art. As a student at the School of the Museum of Fine Arts, Boston, she received a scholarship to work at the Art Students League of New York. Her papers are currently in the collection of the Archives of American Art. Ten of her caricatures of artists are owned by the National Portrait Gallery.
