= John Fitzgerald Kennedy National Historic Site =

Birthplace and childhood home of John F. Kennedy

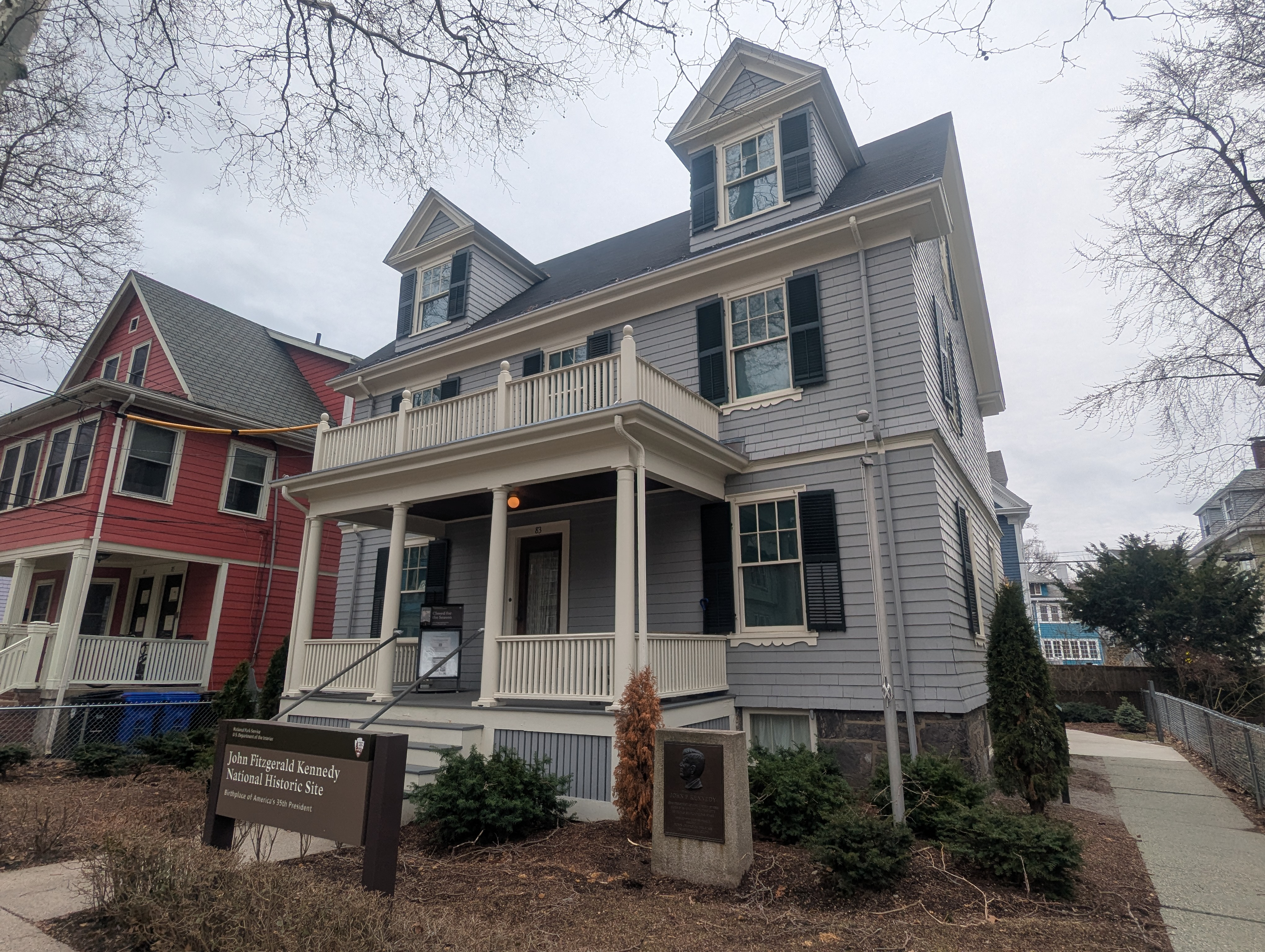
- The house in 2026

- Location within Massachusetts Location within the United States
- Location: Brookline, Massachusetts, U.S.
- Nearest city: Boston, Massachusetts
- Coordinates: 42°20′49″N 71°07′24″W
- Area: 0.09 acres (0.036 ha)
- Established: May 26, 1967
- Visitors: 9,664 (in 2025)
- Governing body: National Park Service
- Website: John Fitzgerald Kennedy National Historic Site

The John Fitzgerald Kennedy National Historic Site is the birthplace and childhood home of John F. Kennedy, the 35th president of the United States. The house is at 83 Beals Street in the Coolidge Corner neighborhood of Brookline, Massachusetts. Kennedy is one of four U.S. presidents born in Norfolk County, Massachusetts. The property is now owned by the National Park Service; tours of the house are offered, and a film is presented.

The Kennedy home was designated a National Historic Landmark in 1964, and was established as a National Historic Site on May 26, 1967.

== History ==
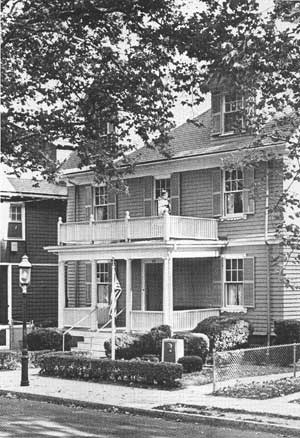
The house in 1974.

The house was purchased by Joseph Patrick Kennedy Sr. on 20 August 1914 in preparation for his marriage to Rose Elizabeth Fitzgerald on 7 October 1914.

John and his sisters Rosemary and Kathleen were born in the upstairs master bedroom. The family lived there until 1920, when the growth of the family motivated the Kennedys to move to a larger home just a few blocks away on the corner of Abbottsford and Naples Roads, just outside Boston. The Kennedys sold the Beals Street house to Joe Kennedy's advisor Edward Moore and his family. The Kennedys lived in the Abbottsford Road home until 1927, when Joe Kennedy's business interests prompted the family's move to Riverdale, New York City.

The Kennedy family was the third owner of the house on Beals Street. It was built in 1909, a period of rapid growth in Brookline. The Kennedys moved into the home, then the last on the street, after returning from their honeymoon in 1914. A few months after they were married, Joe Kennedy purchased a new Model T Ford that he used to commute to downtown, where he worked as the president of the Columbia Trust Bank. The "T" line to Coolidge Corner existed when the Kennedys were living in Brookline. Rose Kennedy would often walk from the Beals Street house down to the shopping district in Coolidge Corner, where there was an S.S. Pierce store—which replaced the Coolidge & Brothers General Store—among the other shops. Brookline was a rapidly growing suburb of Boston, and it appealed to the growing Kennedy family because the suburbs would have more space for the children to play than if they were raised in the crowded inner city of Boston.

In 1966, the Kennedy family repurchased the home. From 1966 to 1969, Rose Kennedy restored it to her recollection of its 1917 appearance. She wanted to restore the home to the hour of John's birth, but the home really paints a picture of a typical American home 1914–1920. About 19% of the artifacts in the home are original to the Kennedy family, either used in the Beals Street residence or in later homes and returned to Beals Street during the restoration. Rose Kennedy worked with an interior designer named Robert Luddington as she restored the home, and he was largely in charge of procuring the rest of the items in the home, which are either period antiques or reproductions.

Rose Kennedy donated the home to the National Park Service in 1967 as a memorial to her son. It is open to the public and visitors can take a ranger-guided tour or self-guided tours through the home.

=== Arson attack ===
On September 8, 1975, gangster Whitey Bulger and an unidentified associate tossed a Molotov cocktail into the building in retaliation for Senator Ted Kennedy's vocal support for Boston school desegregation. The two gangsters cut through a backyard and jumped a fence before arriving at the house. Bulger used black spray paint to scrawl “Bus Teddy” on the sidewalk just outside of the house. Going around to the back, Bulger lit the Molotov and tossed it through a window into the kitchen, which exploded on a gold carpet. Bulger and the associate were seen running from the scene but the witness could only remember they were wearing dark clothes.

== Description ==
The house: Visitors can tour each of these rooms by both the ranger led and the self-guided tours.

The basement: The basement is the visitors' entrance and National Park visitor center. There is a public restroom and a small Eastern National retail shop. Visitors can view the exhibits and photographs and watch a film.

Living room: Visitors to the Kennedy home would have been shown into the living room, or parlor as it would have been called when the family lived there. Here, visitors can see both a space for formal entertaining within the home, but also a space where the family would relax in the evenings when the children were getting ready for bed and when Joe Kennedy returned from his office in Boston. The piano dominating the parlor belonged to Rose Kennedy and is one of the original pieces in the home. It was a wedding gift from two of her uncles.

Dining room: The dining room has the home's most complete collection of Kennedy artifacts. The china was Rose's wedding china. The table would not have been set with a formal place setting for day to day meals. Rose Kennedy set the table this way because as she was turning the house into a museum, she was expecting company. Meals were a time for the family to have lively discussions about topics that ranged from history, to politics, current events and religion. Rose was fond of saying "history is shaped by those who get their ideas across" and mealtime discussions were a staple in the Kennedy home. Meals were a formal affair, with the family assembling in the dining room and the food brought from the kitchen by a uniformed maid.

Master bedroom: The master bedroom is where Jack, Rosemary and Kathleen Kennedy were born. Jack Kennedy was born at 3:00pm on May 29, 1917. Rose Kennedy had seven of her nine children at home, and the same doctor, Dr. Good, delivered all of them, as well as the final two who were born in a hospital. The bedroom has several photographs, including the 6 month old baby pictures of Joe Jr., Jack, Rosemary, and Kathleen.

Nursery: The nursery has a bassinet that would eventually hold each of the nine Kennedy children, as well as a christening cap, gown, and a number of books and toys Joe Jr. and Jack would have played with. Visitors can see Jack's two favorite books: King Arthur and his Knights and Billy Whiskers and His Kids.

Guest bedroom: The guest bedroom showcases linens bearing Rose's initials, REF, and Rosemary Kennedy's toiletry set. The guest room was converted to a girl's bedroom as soon as Rosemary and Kathleen were born.

Boudoir: The boudoir was Rose's private space as well as her office space. She would use the desk to keep track of the accounts of the household and to do her correspondence. The desk showcases a card file. Rose kept an index card for each of her children where she would list important milestones in their medical history - things like vaccinations, major illnesses and hospital stays, as well as birthdays and confirmation dates. Jack Kennedy's card is on the desk.

Kitchen: The kitchen would have been the domain of the household's servants. It was modern for the time; the stove is a combination coal and gas, and the family had an electric toaster as well as a large icebox. Servants would have frequented the kitchen and the basement, which at the time would have been used for laundry.

3rd floor: The third floor is not included on the tours. It has two attic rooms the servants used. Rose Kennedy hired both a French and an Irish girl, Alice Michelin and Mary O'Donahue as the maid-of-all-work and nanny in the house. Their bedrooms were on the third floor. More information on domestic servants is on the park's website. The third floor was not restored by Rose Kennedy along with the rest of the house in the 1960s. This was due to the fact she did not have a complete memory of those rooms. Today, they are the park's administrative offices.

== See also ==
- List of National Historic Landmarks in Massachusetts
- National Register of Historic Places listings in Brookline, Massachusetts
- List of areas in the United States National Park System
- List of memorials to John F. Kennedy
- List of residences of presidents of the United States
- Presidential memorials in the United States
