= Public Schools of Brookline =

School district in Massachusetts, US

Public Schools of Brookline (PSB) is the school district of Brookline, Massachusetts.

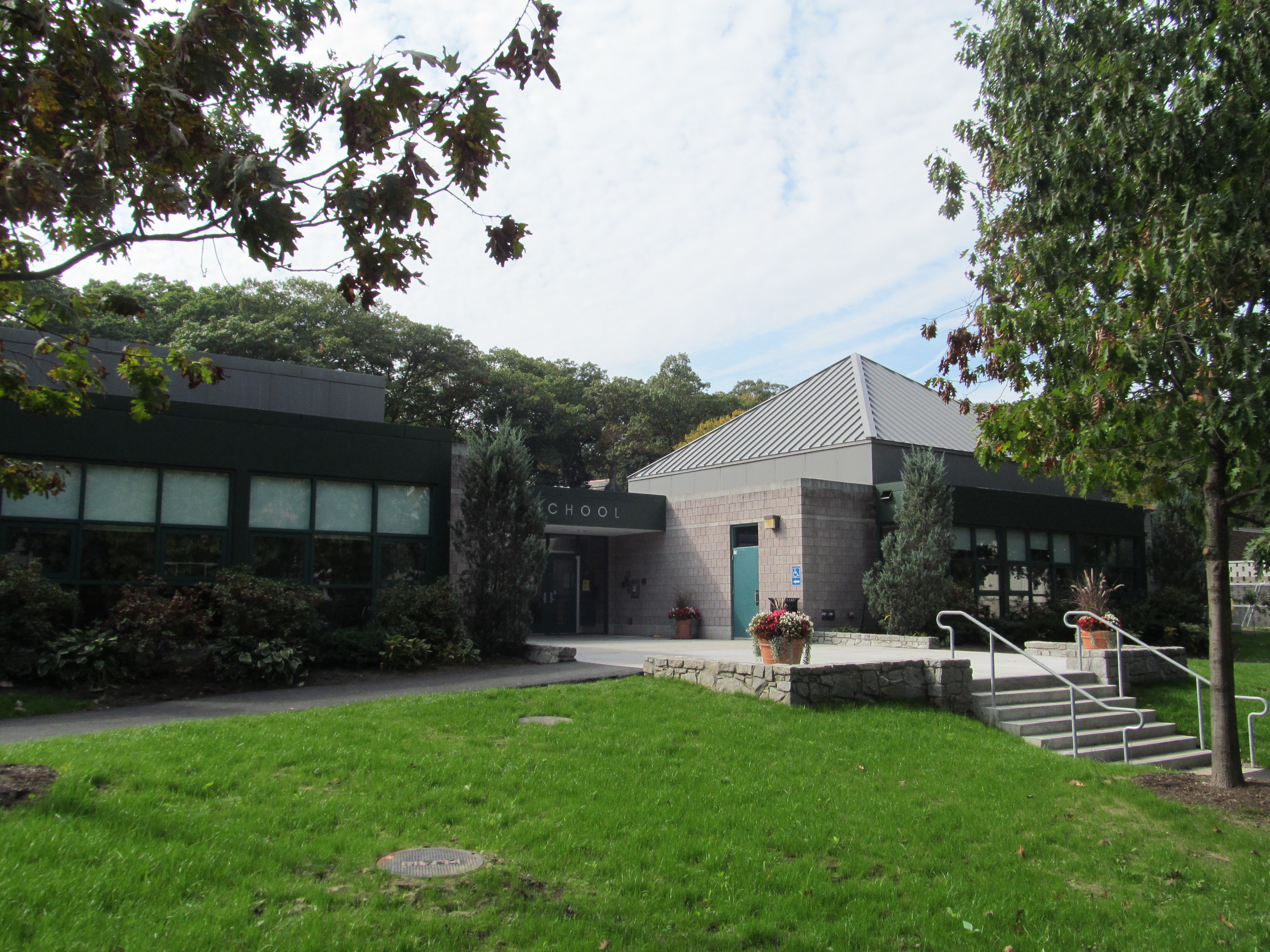
Heath school

As of 2019 it had over 7,500 students. They operate eight elementary (K-8) schools and one high school in the Town of Brookline.

In 2025, the district had a budget shortfall of $8 million.

== Schools ==
Senior high school

- Brookline High School

K-8 schools

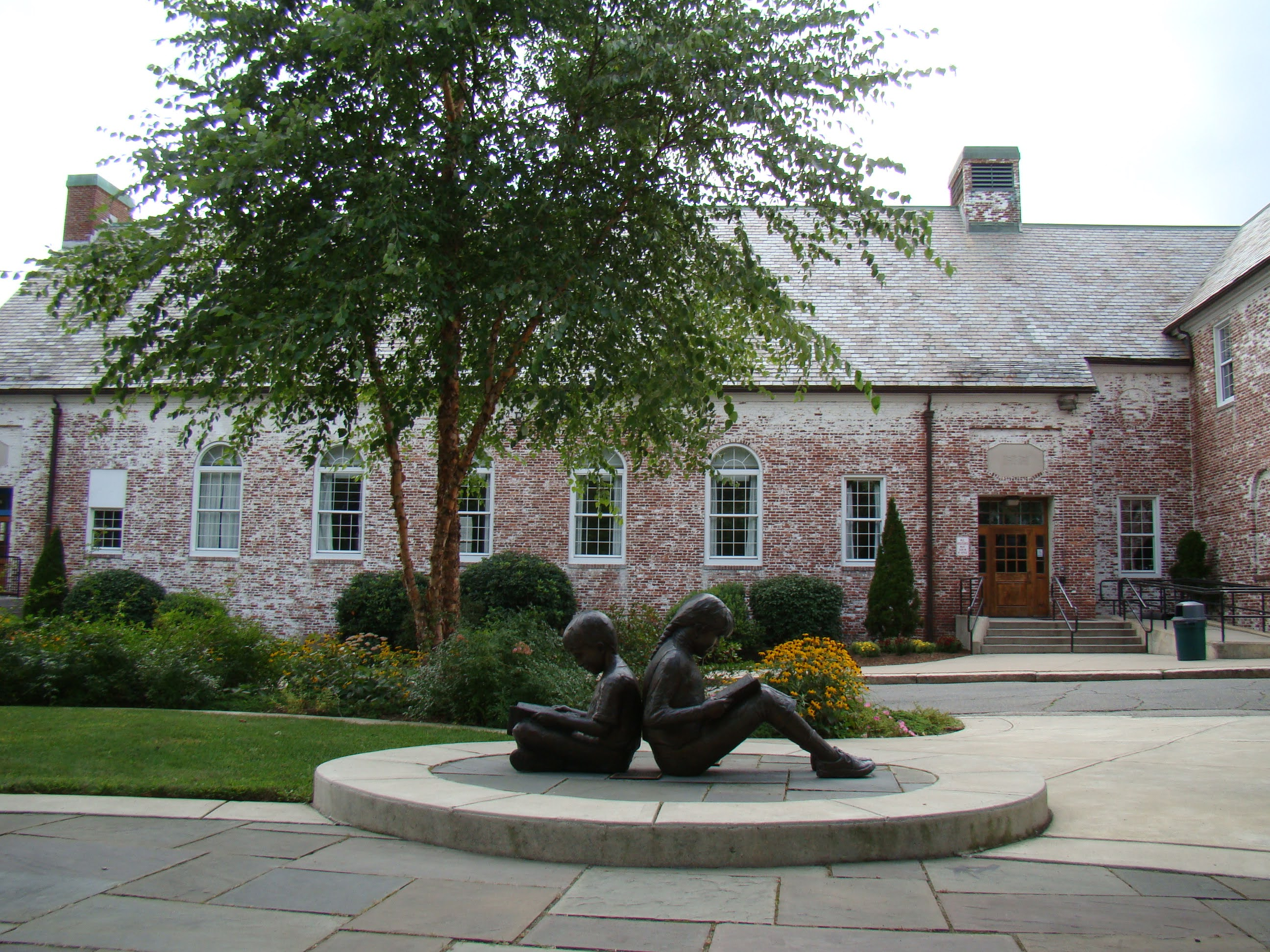
Edith C. Baker School, first building 1936 in colonial revival style with whitewashed brick

- Edith C. Baker School
- Florida Ruffin Ridley School (formerly Edward Devotion School and Coolidge Corner School)
- Michael Driscoll School
- Heath School (Roland Hayes School as of January 2024)
- Amos A. Lawrence School
- William H. Lincoln School
- John Pierce School
- John D. Runkle School

Preschool

- Brookline Early Education Program (BEEP)

Other Buildings used for special purposes

- The old Lincoln School at 194 Boylston Street.
- The Baldwin School at 484 Heath Street.
