= Minnie Goodnow =

American nurse, and nursing educator(1871–1952)

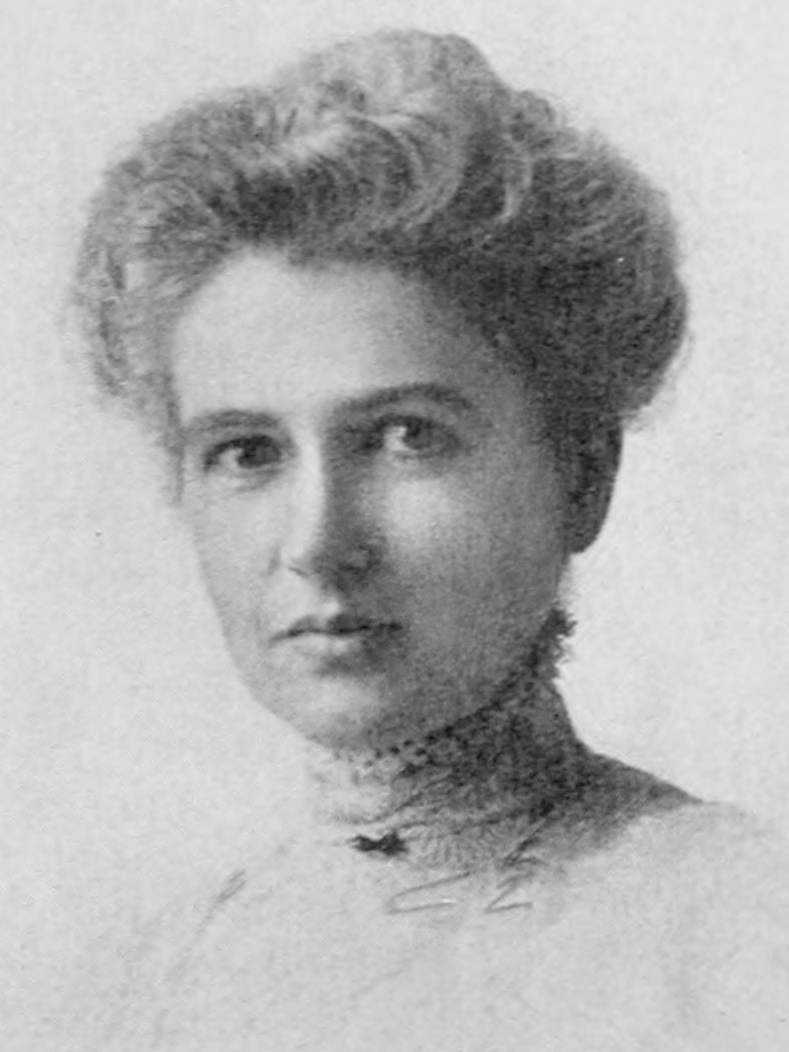
Minnie Goodnow, from a 1915 publication.

Minnie Goodnow (July 10, 1871 – February 9, 1952) was an American nurse, nursing educator, and historian of nursing. During World War I she was a member of the second Harvard Unit of nurses who sailed for France in late 1915.

== Early life ==
Minnie Goodnow was born in Albion, New York, the daughter of Franklin Goodnow and Elizabeth Goodnow. She attended nursing school in Denver, Colorado.

== Career ==
Goodnow was a registered nurse. She served as superintendent at the Woman's Hospital in Denver, Colorado, at Bronson Hospital in Kalamazoo, Michigan, and at Children's Hospital in Washington, D.C., and as director of nursing at Milwaukee County Hospital and the University of Pennsylvania. Her last work before retiring in 1945 was as superintendent of nurses at the Pratt Diagnostic Hospital in Boston.

In 1915 Goodnow joined the second Harvard Unit of American medical personnel. She wrote in detail about her experiences working in military hospitals in France and England, in articles for American newspapers and nursing journals. She wrote about the problem of the non-professional nurse volunteer in the war zone, noting "In most cases, she is quite undisciplined, unaccustomed to continuous, prosaic work, and entirely without knowledge of, or background for, the unique and peculiar relations which exists between a sick man and his nurse," adding particular caution about "a small but conspicuous number who wish to make an impression by their artistic uniform, to do a few spectacular things and to get credit for being heroines."

After her return from active war work, Goodnow gave lectures about her experiences. She wrote and lectured on rehabilitation nursing, and on nursing education. Goodnow was superintendent of nurses at Newport Hospital in Rhode Island from 1929 to 1935. In 1933, she and a colleague attended the Congress of the International Council of Nurses in Paris. She resigned that position to embark on a two-year trip to forty countries, to study nursing programs, give lectures, and research a new edition of her text on the history of nursing.

Published works by Goodnow include The Nursing of Children (1914, with Zula Pasley), Ten Lessons in Chemistry for Nurses (1914), First-year nursing; a text-book for pupils during their first year of hospital work (1916), Goodnow's History of Nursing (1916), Outlines of Nursing History (1916), War Nursing: A Text-Book for the Auxiliary Nurse (1917), War Nursing (1918), Practical Physics for Nurses (1919), and The Technic of Nursing (1928). Several of her textbooks went through multiple editions and translations, for decades after publication.

== Personal life ==
Goodnow lived in Brookline, Massachusetts in her later years, and died in 1952, at Pratt Diagnostic Hospital, aged 80 years.
