= Biker Boy =

Fictional character to promote bicycling

Biker Boy is a fictional superhero character created and portrayed by Zach Cone. Biker Boy promotes bicycling as an alternative to walking and driving, and primarily aims to increase the use of helmets, among both children and adults. Biker Boy is based in Greater Boston, Massachusetts, where he frequents local biking areas to spread awareness for bicycle safety.

== Character ==
Biker Boy is a fictional superhero who protects and serves the bicycling community. He was invented by Zach Cone, who did not initially intend to play the character as well. "I began telling stories to the kids about superheroes", Cone states in an interview with The Boston Globe. " That's when I made up this character, Biker Boy, whose bike has magical powers that tells him if someone's in trouble. The kids loved it. They thought it was real and that I was Biker Boy, even though I told them I wasn't." Biker Boy has also recorded voice announcement's for Boston's MBTA train and bus services, promoting bicycling as an alternative method of transportation. The recording was a part of a larger initiative by mayor Thomas Menino to make Boston a more bike-friendly city. Biker Boy has been consistently noted for his red cape.

== Zach Cone ==
Zach Cone (born July 26, 1983), is a certified pre-kindergarten teacher. He attended Brookline High School in Brookline, Massachusetts, where he realized he could sleep longer by biking to school. Cone began teaching pre-school while he was in college, often telling the students superhero stories. He invented Biker Boy originally as an external character, but the students thought he was talking about himself, hence Cone eventually assuming the role of Biker Boy himself. Cone states on the development of his character, "Six months ago I drove cross-country with some friends. We brought our bikes so we could ride as much as possible. That's when I realized Boston has a lot of work to do to be a bike friendly city and I decided to be part of the solution."

When asked, "How are you the solution to Boston's bicycle problem?" Cone, as Biker Boy, immediately responded "I talk to people politely. There's too much anger in the first place. And I encourage them to wear helmets."
