= Brookline, Massachusetts =

- Town
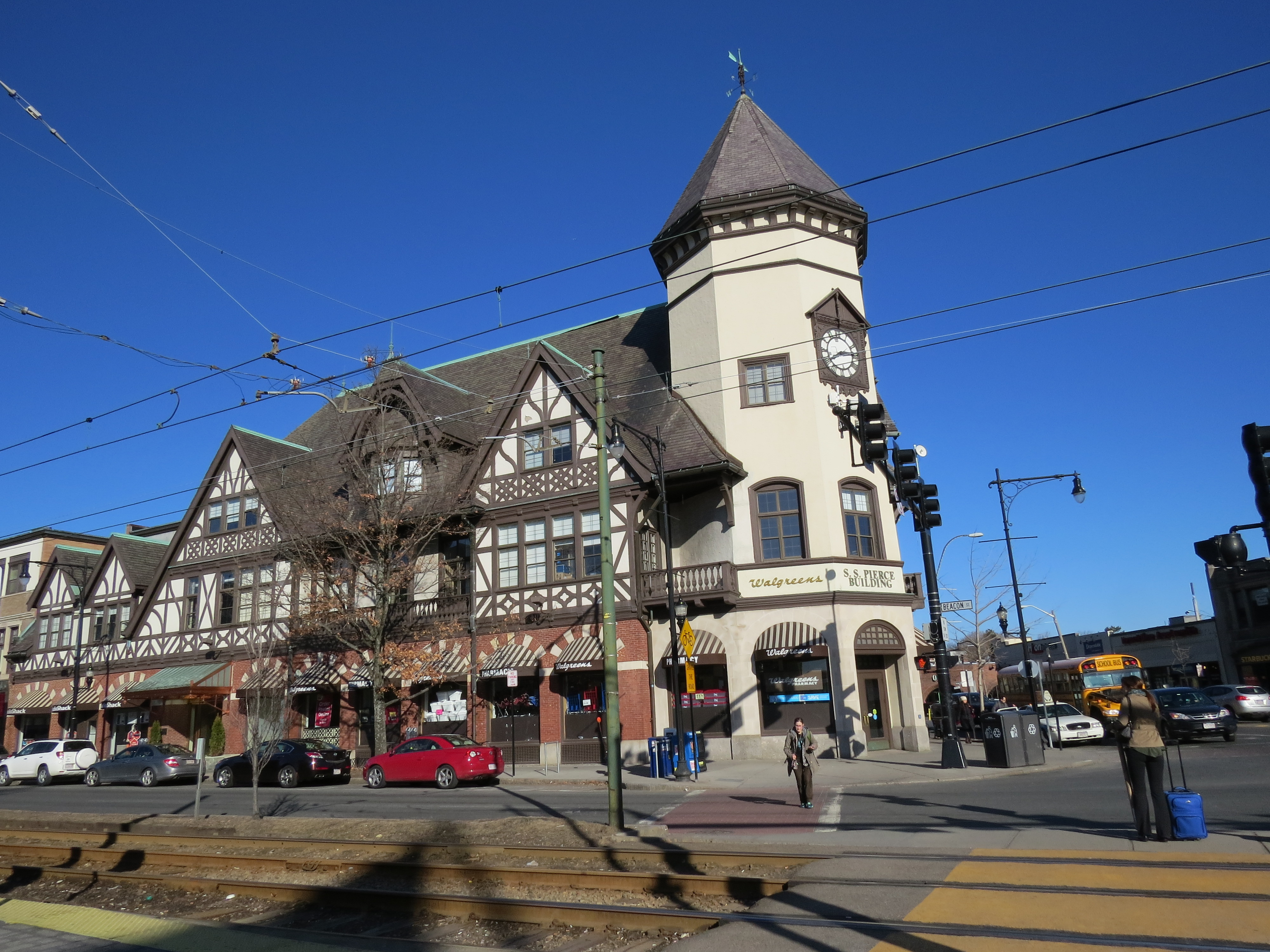
- S. S. Pierce Building in the Coolidge Corner neighborhood

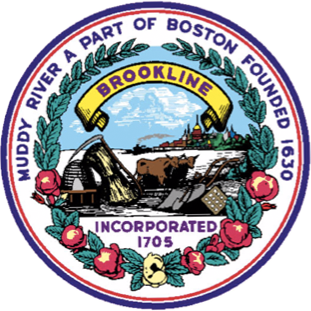
- Seal

- Location as an exclave of Norfolk County in Massachusetts

- Location within Greater Boston area Location within Massachusetts Location within the United States
- Coordinates: 42°19′54″N 71°07′18″W
- Country: United States
- State: Massachusetts
- County: Norfolk
- Settled: 1638
- Incorporated: 1705

Government
  - Type: Representative town meeting
  - Town Administrator: Charles Carey
  - Select Board: David Pearlman (Chair); Michael Rubenstein (Vice-chair); Bernard Greene; Amanda Zimmerman; Anthony Buono

Area
  - Total: 6.8 sq mi (17.7 km^{2})
  - Land: 6.8 sq mi (17.6 km^{2})
  - Water: 0.039 sq mi (0.1 km^{2})
- Elevation: 49 ft (15 m)

Population (2020)
  - Total: 63,191
  - Density: 9,299/sq mi (3,590.4/km^{2})
- Time zone: UTC−5 (Eastern)
  - Summer (DST): UTC−4 (Eastern)
- ZIP Codes: 02445–02446 (Brookline); 02447 (Brookline Village); 02467 (Chestnut Hill)
- Area code: 617/857
- FIPS code: 25-09175
- GNIS feature ID: 0619456
- Website: www.brooklinema.gov

Brookline (/ˈbrʊklaɪn/) is a town in Norfolk County, Massachusetts, United States, and part of the Boston metropolitan area. An exclave of Norfolk County, Brookline borders six of the City of Boston's neighborhoods: Brighton, Allston, Fenway–Kenmore, Mission Hill, Jamaica Plain, and West Roxbury. The city of Newton borders Brookline to the west. It is known for being the birthplace of U.S. President John F. Kennedy and Conan O'Brien.

The land which comprises what is today Brookline was first settled in 1638 as a hamlet in Boston, known as Muddy River (as it was settled on the west side of the river of the same name). It was incorporated as a separate town with the name of Brookline in 1705.

Several streets and railroads were laid out in the town in the 19th century. Today, these are Massachusetts Route 9 (locally Boylston St., which unofficially divides north and south Brookline) and the various branches of the MBTA's Green Line. To the north of Route 9, the area is fairly urban; the southern part is much less so.

At the time of the 2020 census, the population of the town was 63,191.

== History ==
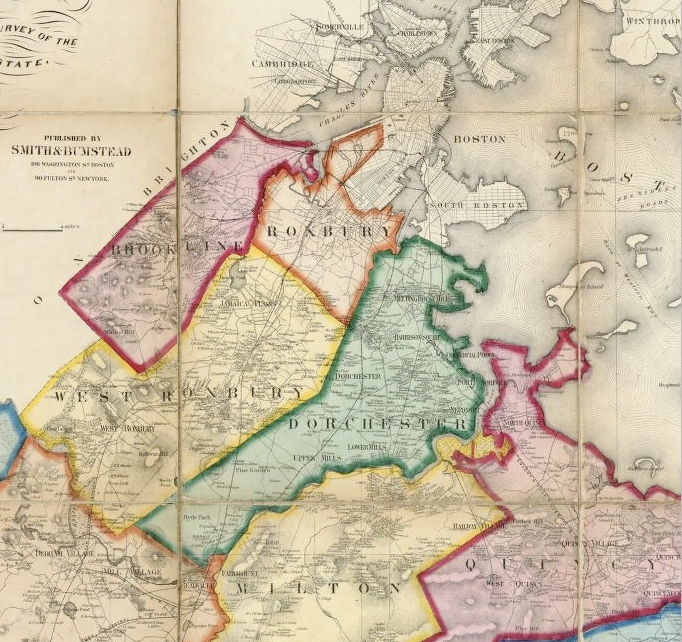
This 1858 map of north-central Norfolk County, shows Brookline (upper left) along with Dorchester, Roxbury, and West Roxbury, all three of which were later annexed by Boston.

Once part of Algonquian territory, Brookline was first settled by European colonists in the early 17th century. The area was an outlying part of the colonial settlement of Boston and known as the hamlet of Muddy River. In 1705, it was incorporated as the independent town of Brookline. It was bounded by a section of the Charles River between the now covered Smelt Brook in the west and the Muddy River in the east.

In 1843, the town had a history of racial discrimination in zoning and a Black population of 2.5%. A typical racially restrictive covenant was formulated to forbade resale of a given property to "any negro or native of Ireland."

The Town of Brighton was merged with Boston in 1874, and the Boston-Brookline border was redrawn to connect the new Back Bay neighborhood with Allston-Brighton. Boston annexed the strip of land along the Charles River, cutting Brookline off from the shoreline. The current northern border follows Commonwealth Avenue, and on the northeast, St. Mary's Street. When Frederick Law Olmsted designed the Emerald Necklace of parks and parkways for Boston in the 1890s, the Muddy River was integrated into the Riverway and Olmsted Park, creating parkland accessible by both Boston and Brookline residents.

In 1873, Brookline had a contentious referendum in which it voted to remain independent from Boston. The later annexations of Brighton and West Roxbury, both in 1874, and that of Hyde Park in 1912, eventually made Brookline into an exclave of Norfolk County.

Brookline has long been regarded as a pleasant and verdant environment. In the 1841 edition of the Theory and Practice of Landscape Gardening, Andrew Jackson Downing described the area this way:

The whole of this neighborhood of Brookline is a kind of landscape garden, and there is nothing in America of the sort, so inexpressibly charming as the lanes which lead from one cottage, or villa, to another. No animals are allowed to run at large, and the open gates, with tempting vistas and glimpses under the pendent boughs, give it quite an Arcadian air of rural freedom and enjoyment. These lanes are clothed with a profusion of trees and wild shrubbery, often almost to the carriage tracks, and curve and wind about, in a manner quite bewildering to the stranger who attempts to thread them alone; and there are more hints here for the lover of the picturesque in lanes than we ever saw assembled together in so small a compass.

Brookline residents were among the first in the country to propose extending the vote to women. Benjamin F. Butler, in his 1882 campaign for governor, advocated the idea.

=== Transportation history ===
Two branches of upper Boston Post Road, established in the 1670s, passed through Brookline. Brookline Village was the original center of retail activity. In 1810, the Boston and Worcester Turnpike, now Massachusetts Route 9, was laid out, starting on Huntington Avenue in Boston and passing through the village center on its way west.

Steam railroads came to Brookline in the middle of the 19th century. The Boston and Worcester Railroad was constructed in the early 1830s, and passed through Brookline near the Charles River. The rail line is still in active use, now paralleled by the Massachusetts Turnpike. The Highland branch of the Boston and Albany Railroad was built from Kenmore Square to Brookline Village in 1847, and was extended into Newton in 1852. In the late 1950s, this became the Green Line D branch.

The portion of Beacon Street west of Kenmore Square was laid out in 1850. Streetcar tracks were laid above ground on Beacon Street in 1888, from Coolidge Corner to Massachusetts Avenue in Boston, via Kenmore Square. In 1889, they were electrified and extended over the Brighton border at Cleveland Circle. They would eventually become the Green Line C branch.

Due to the Boston Elevated Railway system, this upgrade from horse-drawn carriage to electric trolleys occurred on many major streets all over the region, and made transportation into downtown Boston faster and cheaper. Much of Brookline was developed into a streetcar suburb, with large, brick apartment buildings sprouting up along the new streetcar lines.

=== Housing and zoning history ===
Brookline has a history of racial covenants that blocked racial minorities and some ethnic minorities to own housing there. In the early 20th century, Brookline banned the construction of triple-decker housing, which was a form of housing popular with poor immigrant communities in the United States. Advocates for the ban justified the ban with anti-immigrant rhetoric.

In 1922, Prescott F. Hall, a Brookline resident who co-founded the Immigration Restriction League, petitioned the Brookline government to exclusively allow single-family housing. In 1924, the Brookline government enacted a zoning change to only permit single-family housing in most of Brookline. Many of the present-day apartment buildings in Brookline were constructed prior to this zoning change.

In 1970, the state authorized rent control in municipalities with more than 50,000 residents. Brookline, Lynn, Somerville, and Cambridge subsequently adopted rent control. Brookline began decontrolling units in 1991. In 1987, a group of South Brookline residents petitioned to have Precinct 15 removed from Brookline and annexed to Newton. "The homeowner, the major source of property tax revenue is functionally disenfranchised in Brookline; politics is completely dominated by the tenants and the rent control interest," one organizer said of the reason they wanted to move.

Brookline has a recent history of blocking multifamily housing construction. Since the 1970s, new housing construction has plunged in Brookline. It has enacted zoning changes that ban multifamily apartment buildings and limit the height of buildings. Proposals for new development frequently face onerous lawsuits. These restrictions on housing supply have led housing prices in Brookline to skyrocket in recent decades. In 2023, the median sale price for a single-family home in Brookline was $2.51 million, and the median condo price was $927,500.

As a consequence of restrictions on housing supply, Brookline is overwhelmingly wealthy. Only 2.5% of its population is Black, which is the second-lowest share of Black people in any community in the Boston area. Only 14% of Brookline teachers, 21% of Brookline police, and 22% of Brookline firefighters live in Brookline, as median salaries for these kinds of jobs make housing in Brookline largely unaffordable.

=== Etymology ===
Brookline was known as the hamlet of Muddy River and was considered part of Boston until the Town of Brookline was independently incorporated in 1705. (The Muddy River was used as the Brookline–Boston border at incorporation.) The name is said to derive from a farm therein once owned by Judge Samuel Sewall. Originally, the property of Cpt John Hull and Judith Quincy Hull, Judge Sewall came into possession of this tract, which embraced more than 350 acres, through Hannah Quincy Hull (Sewall) who was the Hulls' only daughter. John Hull in his youth lived in Muddy River Hamlet, in a little house which stood near the Sears Memorial Church. Hull removed to Boston, where he amassed a large fortune for those days. Judge Sewall probably never lived on his Brookline estate.

== Geography ==
According to the United States Census Bureau, Brookline has a total area of 6.8 sq mi (17.7 km^{2}), 0.039 sq mi (0.1 km^{2}) (0.44%) of which is covered by water.

The northern part of Brookline, roughly north of the D-line tracks, is urban in character, highly walkable and transit rich. The population density of this northern part of town is nearly 20,000 inhabitants per square mile (8,000/km^{2}), similar to the densest neighborhoods in nearby Cambridge, Somerville, and Chelsea, Massachusetts (the densest cities in New England), and slightly lower than that of central Boston's residential districts (Back Bay, South End, Fenway, etc.). The overall density of Brookline, which also includes suburban districts and grand estates south of the D-line, is still higher than that of many of the largest cities in the United States, especially in the South and West. Brookline borders Newton (part of Middlesex County) to the west and Boston (part of Suffolk County) in all other directions; it is therefore noncontiguous with any other part of Norfolk County. Brookline became an exclave of Norfolk County in 1873, when the neighboring town of West Roxbury was annexed by Boston (and left Norfolk County to join Suffolk County). Brookline refused to be annexed by Boston after the Boston–Brookline annexation debate of 1873.

Brookline separates the bulk of the city of Boston (except for a narrow neck or corridor near the Charles River) from its westernmost neighborhoods of Allston–Brighton, which had been the separate town of Brighton until annexed by Boston in 1873.

=== Neighborhoods ===
Many neighborhood associations are active, some of which overlap.

Neighborhoods, squares, and notable areas of Brookline include:

- Aspinwall Hill
- Beaconsfield
- Brookline Hills
- Brookline Village
- Buttonwood Village
- Brookline High School, Near Pierce District
- Chestnut Hill, which also extends into Newton and Boston
- Coolidge Corner
- Corey Farm
- Corey Hill
- Cottage Farm
- Fisher Hill
- Griggs Park
- JFK Crossing
- Longwood
- North Brookline
- Pill Hill (also known as "High Street Hill")
- The Point (originally "Whiskey Point")
- The Runkle District
- South Brookline ("Sobro")
- The Heights (just west of Washington Square)
- Washington Square
- Woodland Heath

=== Climate ===
The climate of Brookline is humid continental Dfa.

Climate data for Brookline, MA
Month	Jan	Feb	Mar	Apr	May	Jun	Jul	Aug	Sep	Oct	Nov	Dec	Year
Record high °F (°C)	72.0 (22.2)	70.0 (21.1)	89.0 (31.7)	94.0 (34.4)	97.0 (36.1)	100.0 (37.8)	104.0 (40.0)	102.0 (38.9)	102.0 (38.9)	90.0 (32.2)	83.0 (28.3)	76.0 (24.4)	104.0 (40.0)
Mean daily maximum °F (°C)	36.0 (2.2)	39.0 (3.9)	45.0 (7.2)	56.0 (13.3)	66.0 (18.9)	76.0 (24.4)	82.0 (27.8)	80.0 (26.7)	72.0 (22.2)	61.0 (16.1)	52.0 (11.1)	41.0 (5.0)	58.83 (14.91)
Mean daily minimum °F (°C)	22.0 (−5.6)	25.0 (−3.9)	31.0 (−0.6)	41.0 (5.0)	50.0 (10.0)	60.0 (15.6)	65.0 (18.3)	65.0 (18.3)	57.0 (13.9)	47.0 (8.3)	38.0 (3.3)	28.0 (−2.2)	44.08 (6.71)
Record low °F (°C)	−30.0 (−34.4)	−18.0 (−27.8)	−8.0 (−22.2)	11.0 (−11.7)	31.0 (−0.6)	41.0 (5.0)	50.0 (10.0)	46.0 (7.8)	34.0 (1.1)	25.0 (−3.9)	−2.0 (−18.9)	−17.0 (−27.2)	−30.0 (−34.4)
Average precipitation inches (mm)	3.36 (85)	3.38 (86)	4.32 (110)	3.74 (95)	3.49 (89)	3.68 (93)	3.43 (87)	3.35 (85)	3.44 (87)	3.94 (100)	3.99 (101)	3.78 (96)	43.9 (1,120)
Source: Weather.com

Brookline falls under the USDA 6b Plant Hardiness zone.

== Demographics ==
Historical population
Year	Pop.	±%
1790	484	—
1800	605	+25.0%
1810	784	+29.6%
1820	900	+14.8%
1830	1,043	+15.9%
1840	1,365	+30.9%
1850	2,516	+84.3%
1860	5,164	+105.2%
1870	6,650	+28.8%
1880	8,057	+21.2%
1890	12,103	+50.2%
1900	19,935	+64.7%
1910	27,792	+39.4%
1920	37,748	+35.8%
1930	47,490	+25.8%
1940	49,786	+4.8%
1950	57,589	+15.7%
1960	54,044	−6.2%
1970	58,886	+9.0%
1980	55,062	−6.5%
1990	54,718	−0.6%
2000	57,107	+4.4%
2010	58,732	+2.8%
2020	63,191	+7.6%
2024*	63,925	+1.2%
: * = population estimate. Source: United States census records and Population Estimates Program data.

As of the census of 2010, 58,732 people, 24,891 households, and 12,233 families were residing in the town. The population density was 8,701.0 inhabitants per square mile (3,359.5/km^{2}). The 26,448 housing units had an average density of 3,889.6 per square mile (1,501.8/km^{2}). The racial makeup of the town was 73.3% White, 3.4% African American, 0.12% Native American, 15.6% Asian (6.7% Chinese, 2.6% Indian, 2.3% Korean, and 1.8% Japanese), 0.03% Pacific Islander, 1.01% from other races, and 3.0% from two or more races. Hispanics or Latinos of any race were 5.0% of the population (0.9% Mexican and 0.8% Puerto Rican). (Source: 2010 Census Quickfacts)

Of the 25,594 households, 21.9% had children under 18 living with them, 38.4% were married couples living together, 7.1% had a female householder with no husband present, and 52.2% were not families. About 36.7% of all households were made up of individuals, and 10.1% had someone living alone who was 65 or older. The average household size was 2.18 and the average family size was 2.86.

In the town, the age distribution was 16.6% under 18, 11.7%, from 18 to 24, 37.3% from 25 to 44, 21.9% from 45 to 64, and 12.4% who were 65 or older. The median age was 34 years. For every 100 females, there were 82.6 males. For every 100 females 18 and over, there were 79.1 males.

The median income for a household for 2021 in the town was $83,318, and for a family was $122,356. Males had a median income of $56,861 versus $43,436 for females. The per capita income for the town was $44,327. About 4.5% of families and 9.3% of the population were below the poverty line, including 5.3% of those under the age of 18 and 7.5% of those ages 65 and older. The poverty rate of Brookline's residents rate rose from 9.3% in 2000 to 13.1% in 2010. and then reduced to 10.2% in 2021

== Arts and culture ==
- Brookline, along with the nearby Boston neighborhood of Brighton and the city of Newton, is a cultural hub for the Jewish community of Greater Boston.
- The Greek Orthodox Archdiocese of America Metropolis of Boston is headquartered in Brookline.
- Brookline Village is home to Puppet Showplace Theater, New England's only dedicated puppet theater and center for puppetry arts. The theater is located in the historic 32 Station Street building directly across from the Brookline Village MBTA Green Line stop.
- The four Poet Laureates of Brookline include: Judith Steinbergh, Jan Schreiber, Zvi Sesling, and, currently, Jennifer Barber.
- Along with Boston and Quincy, it has a large Irish American presence.

=== Points of interest ===
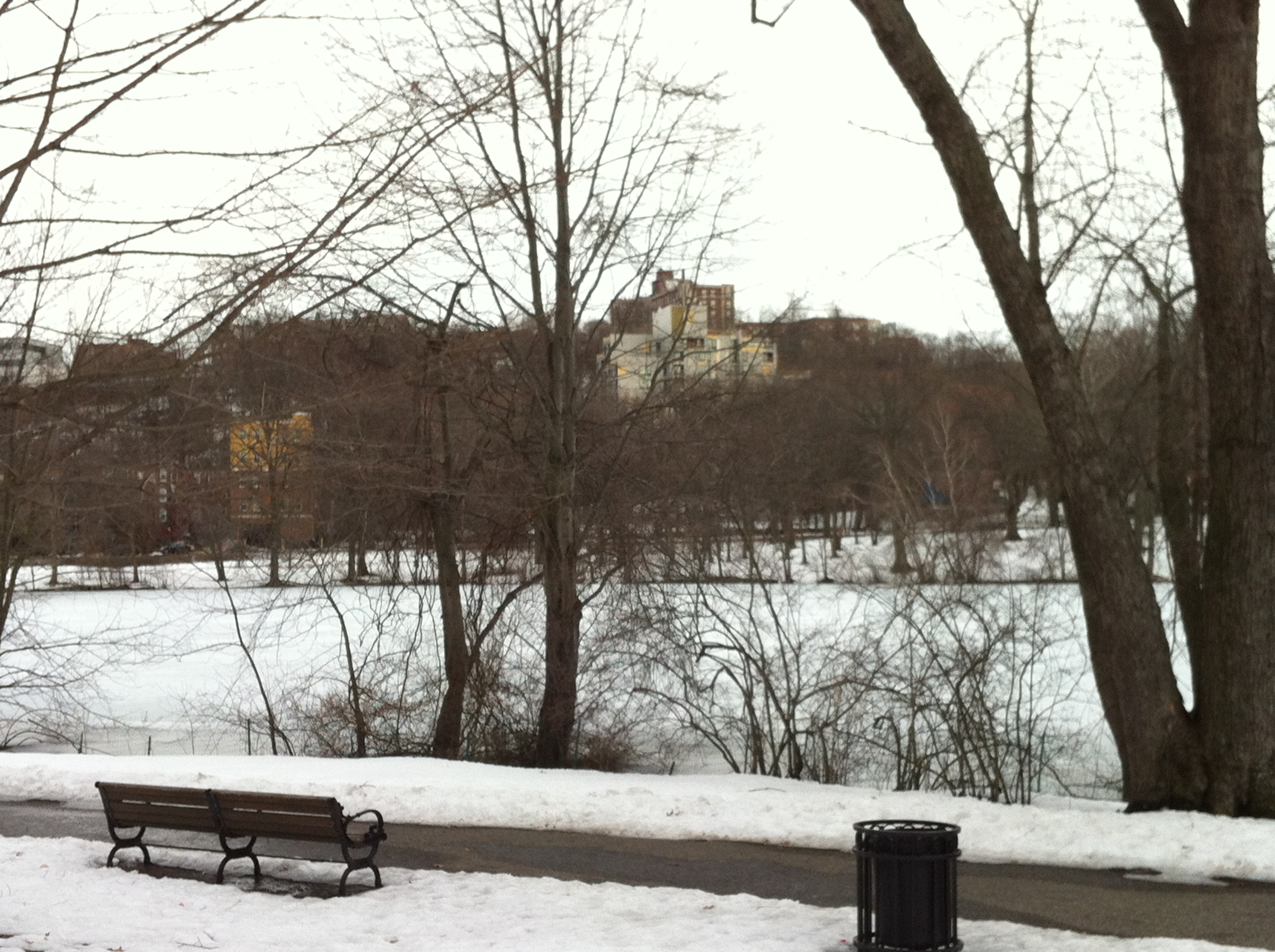
Overlooking Leverett Pond in Olmsted Park from the Brookline side

These historic buildings are open to the public:

- The birthplace of John F. Kennedy stands in Brookline and is listed in the National Register of Historic Places. It is maintained by the National Park Service and is open to the public from May through September.
- Fairsted, the 100-year-old business headquarters and design office for renowned landscape architect Frederick Law Olmsted and the Olmsted Brothers firm, has been carefully preserved as the Frederick Law Olmsted National Historic Site, on 7 acres (2.8 ha) of landscaped grounds at 99 Warren Street.
- John Goddard House, an historic house at 235 Goddard Avenue, was built in 1767 and added to the National Register of Historic Places in 1985.
- Larz Anderson Park is in Brookline on the 64-acre (26 ha) estate once owned by Larz Anderson and Isabel Weld Perkins. The park contains the Larz Anderson Auto Museum, the oldest automobile collection in the country, as well as Putterham School, a one-room schoolhouse from colonial times.
- In 2025, construction began on a 23,000-square-foot center for Chabad at Chestnut Hill, at the intersection of Bellingham Road and Grove Street. The project was scheduled for completion in fall 2027.

Other historic and cultural sites include:

- St. Aidan's Church was where John F. Kennedy was baptized and where the Kennedy family and other prominent Irish-Americans were parishioners. The church was designed by architect Charles Maginnis, who was awarded the American Institute of Architects' gold medal. Although it is listed on the National Register of Historic Places, St. Aidan's Church has been closed and converted into housing.
- The Dutch House, one of only five surviving buildings from the World's Columbian Exposition of 1893 was relocated to Brookline.
- Two stops on the Underground Railroad are in Brookline: 9 Toxteth Street and 182 Walnut Street.
- The Country Club, an exclusive sporting club in the town, was the first private club in the United States formed exclusively for outdoor activities. It is most famous as a golf club; it was one of the five clubs that formed what is now the United States Golf Association and has hosted the U.S. Open four times and the Ryder Cup matches once.
- Coolidge Corner, which is located at the crossing of Beacon Street and Harvard Street, is one of Brookline's two primary retail districts (the other being Washington Square). It includes a number of historically significant sites, including the S.S. Pierce Building and the Coolidge Corner Theatre.
- Brookline is home to part of Frederick Law Olmsted's Emerald Necklace of park systems, including Olmsted Park.
- The Puppet Showplace Theatre, one of the four oldest puppet theatres in the United States, is located in Brookline Village.

== Government ==
Since 1916, Brookline has been governed by a representative town meeting, which is the town's legislative body, and a five-person select board, the town's executive branch. Fifteen town meeting representatives are elected to three-year terms from each of the town's 17 precincts. From 1705 to 1916, the town was governed by an open town meeting and a select board.

=== Laws ===
In 2017, a Brookline Town Meeting voted to recognize Indigenous Peoples' Day instead of Columbus Day.

In 2019, Brookline banned the distribution of carry-out plastic bags at grocery stores and other businesses.

In 2021, Brookline banned the sale of tobacco and e-cigarettes to anyone born after January 1, 2000, in Article 8.23 of the town bylaws, expanding on Massachusetts' existing prohibition on the sale of tobacco products to anyone under the age of 21. In March 2023, the Massachusetts Supreme Judicial Court upheld the bylaw in the case Six Brothers Inc. v. Town of Brookline.

In 2025, the Brookline Town Meeting voted to ban the sale of foie gras. The ban was proposed by four Brookline High School students who argued that the production of foie gras involves extreme animal cruelty.

In 2026, Brookline Town Meeting voted to prohibit civil immigration enforcement activities on Town facilities

== Education ==
=== Public schools ===
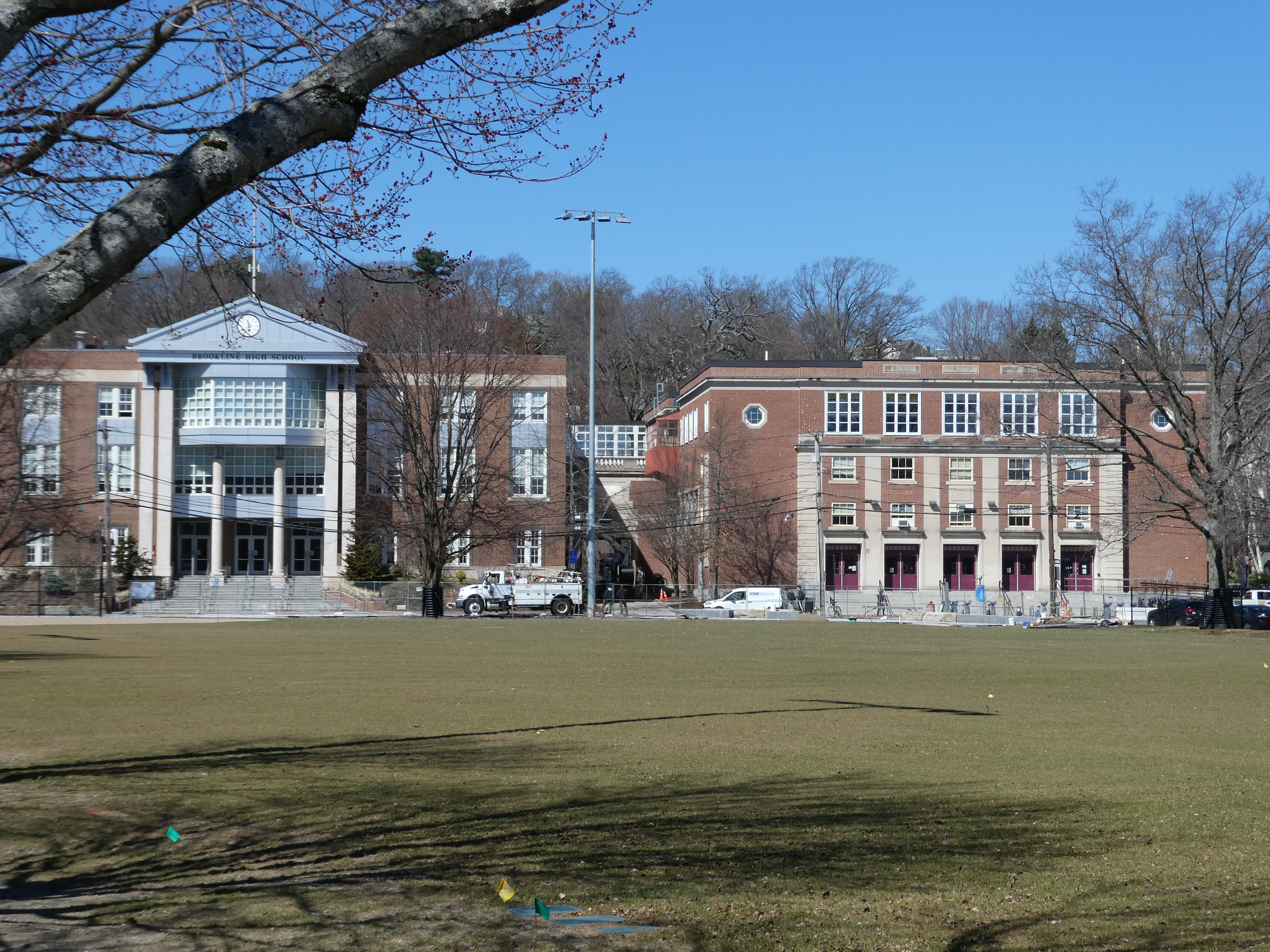
Brookline High School in March 2022

The town is served by the Public Schools of Brookline. The student body at Brookline High School includes students from more than 76 countries. Many students attend Brookline High from surrounding neighborhoods in Boston, such as Mission Hill and Mattapan through the Metropolitan Council for Educational Opportunity system.

The eight elementary schools in the Brookline Public School system are: Baker School, Florida Ruffin Ridley School, Driscoll, Roland Hayes School, Lawrence School, Lincoln School, Pierce School, and Runkle School. As of December 2006, there were 6,089 K–12 students enrolled in the Brookline public schools. The system includes one early learning center, eight grades K–8 schools, and one comprehensive high school. The Old Lincoln School is a surplus building used by the town to temporarily teach students in when another school building is being renovated. It was rented in 2009 as the venue for the play Sleep No More.

As of the 2012–13 school year, the student body was 57.4% White, 18.1% Asian, 6.4% Black, 9.9% Hispanic, and 8.2% multiracial. About 30% of students came from homes where English is not their first language.

=== Private schools ===
Several private primary and secondary schools are located in Brookline.

- Beaver Country Day School
- Brimmer and May School – partly in Newton
- Dexter Southfield School
- Ivy Street School
- Maimonides School
- The Park School
- Saint Mary of the Assumption School

=== Higher education ===
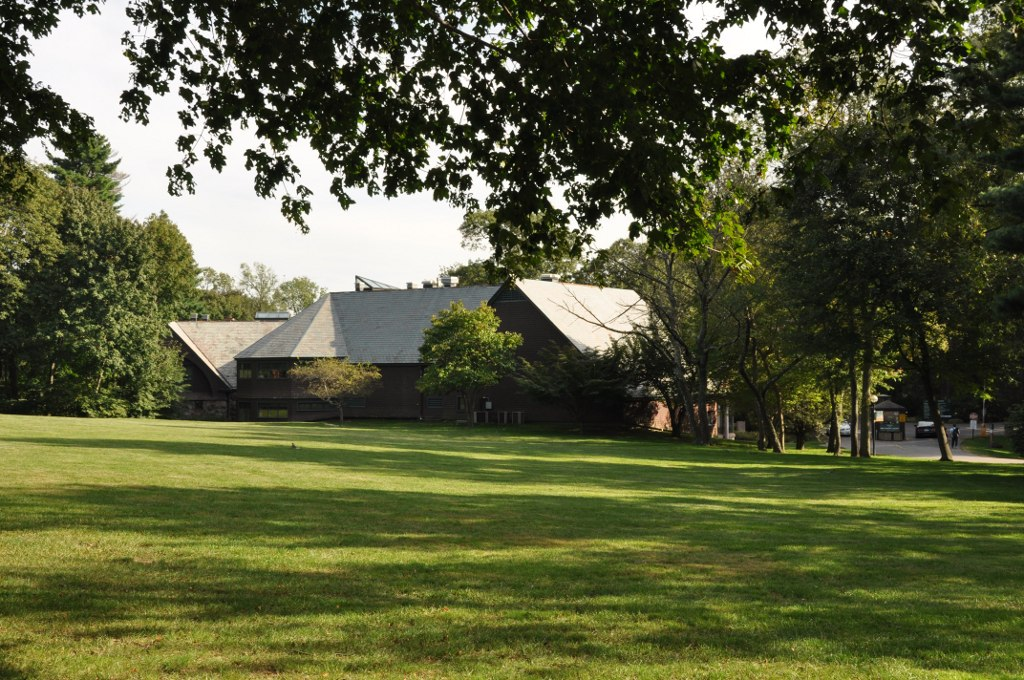
Pine Manor College in 2011

Several institutes of higher education are located in Brookline.

- Pine Manor College as of 2020 became The Pine Manor Institute for Student Success, an initiative by Boston College aimed at increasing access to education for underrepresented students
- Hellenic College and Holy Cross Greek Orthodox School of Theology
- Boston Graduate School of Psychoanalysis

Also, parts of the following are located in Brookline: Boston University including Wheelock College, Boston College, and Northeastern University's Parsons Field.

Newbury College closed in 2019.

== Infrastructure ==
=== Transportation ===
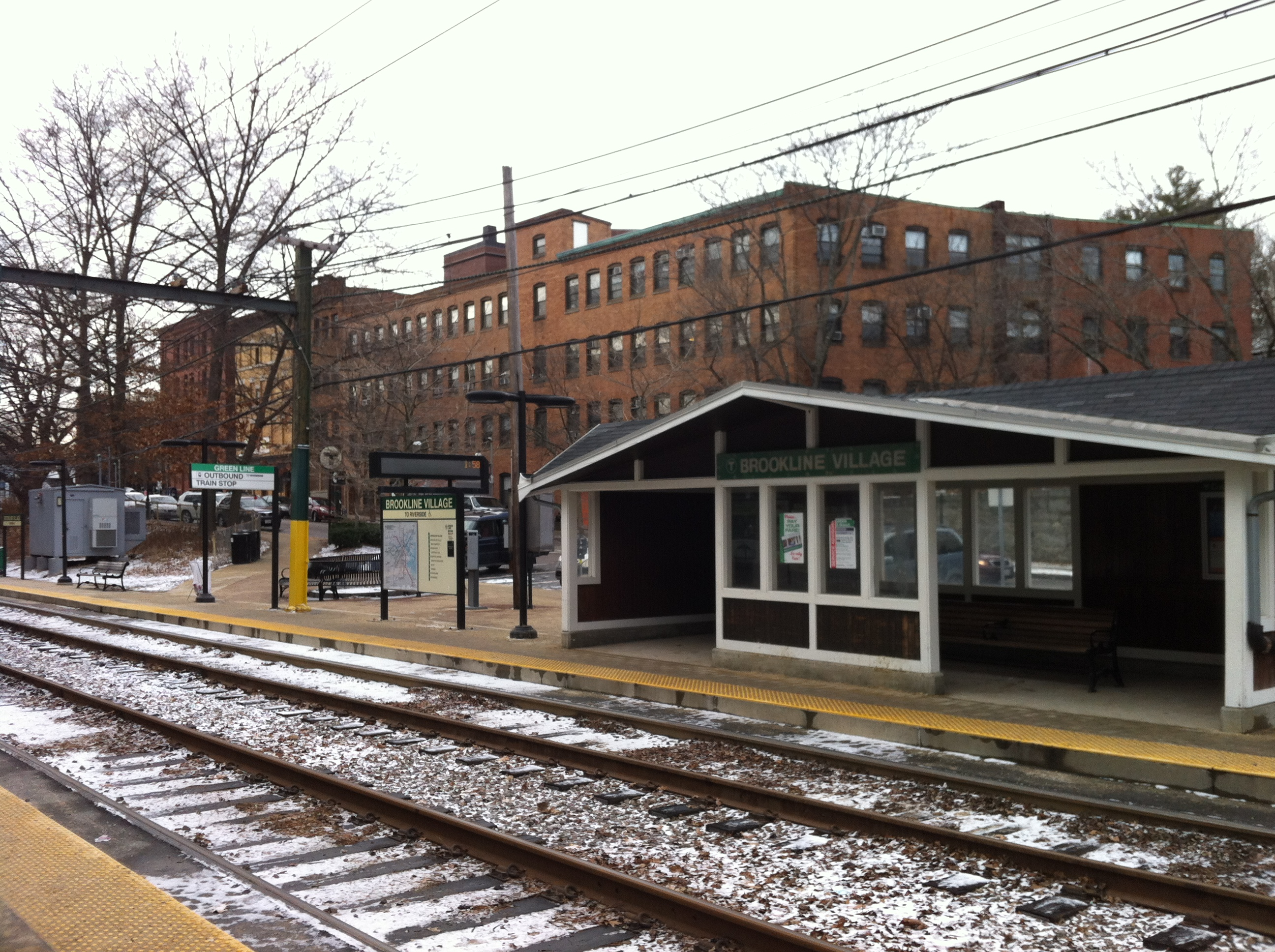
Brookline Village station

==== Light rail and subway ====
Brookline is served by the C and D branches of the MBTA's Green Line trains, with inbound service to downtown Boston and outbound service to Newton. The B line runs just to the northwest of Brookline along Commonwealth Avenue, through the Boston University campus and into Allston-Brighton.

==== Bus ====
Brookline is served by several MBTA bus routes:

- Route 51 – Cleveland Circle–Forest Hills
- Route 60 – Kenmore Square–Chestnut Hill
- Route 65 – Kenmore Square–Brighton
- Route 66 – Harvard University–Nubian station
- Route 86 – Cleveland Circle–Sullivan station

=== Public libraries ===
- Public Library of Brookline, 361 Washington St., Brookline, MA 02445
- Coolidge Corner Branch Library, 31 Pleasant St., Brookline, MA 02446
- Putterham Branch Library, 959 West Roxbury Pkwy., Chestnut Hill, MA 02467

=== Fire department ===
The town of Brookline is protected full-time by 158 professional firefighters of the Brookline Fire Department (BFD). It currently operates out of five fire stations located throughout the town, under the command of a deputy chief per shift. The BFD also operates a fire apparatus fleet of four engines, two ladders, one quint, one cross-staffed rescue (special operations), two squads, one special operations unit, one haz-mat decontamination trailer, two maintenance units, and numerous other special, support, and reserve units. The BFD responds to roughly 8,500 emergency calls annually. The current chief of the BFD is John F. Sullivan.

=== Cemeteries ===
- The Old Burying Ground, also known as Walnut Street Cemetery. 1717 – 1.54 acres (Walnut Street at Chestnut Street)
- Walnut Hills Cemetery 1875 – 45.26 acres (Grove Street and Allandale Road)

== Notable people ==
=== Athletes ===
- Philip Stanley Abbot (1867-1896), mountaineer
- Jeff Adrien (born 1986), University of Connecticut Huskies basketball captain and power forward
- Larry Bird, professional basketball player, lived in Brookline while he played for the Boston Celtics
- Tom Brady, lived in Brookline while quarterback of the New England Patriots
- Gene Clapp (born 1949), silver medalist 1972 Summer Olympics
- Adam Edelman (born 1991), American-born four-time Israeli national champion in skeleton event, and Israeli Olympian
- Kenny Florian, professional mixed martial artist
- George O'Day, sailor

=== Ambassadors ===
- Larz Anderson, U.S. Ambassador to Japan
- Ray Atherton, first U.S. Ambassador to Canada, born and raised in Brookline

=== Academics, scientists, and technologists ===
- Lily Batchelder (21st century), professor at New York University and former chief tax counsel to the U.S. Senate Finance Committee
- Zabdiel Boylston (1679–1766), physician who introduced inoculation against smallpox to the North American colonies in 1721
- Stanley Cavell (1926–2018), professor of philosophy, winner of a MacArthur Fellowship
- Marvin Minsky (1927–2016), Artificial Intelligence theorist, inventor, author, professor
- Herman Chernoff (1923–2026), statistician
- Harvey Cushing (1869–1939), "father of modern neurosurgery"
- Alice Ettinger (1899–1993), radiologist
- Edward Fredkin (1934–2023), digital physics pioneer, inventor of the trie data structure, the Fredkin gate and the Billiard-Ball Computer Model for reversible computing
- Fayette F. Forbes (1851–1935), water engineer, plant collector, and botanist with a particular interest in algae and diatoms
- Irwin Freedberg (1933–2005), dermatologist
- Sheldon Glashow (born 1932), Nobel Prize-winning physicist
- Robert R. Glauber (1939–2021), Harvard faculty, former chairman of NASD
- Robert Goldwyn (1930–2010), editor-in-chief of Plastic and Reconstructive Surgery for 25 years, professor of surgery at Harvard Medical School, and chief of Plastic Surgery at Beth Israel Hospital
- Irene Jakab (1919–2011), psychiatrist, humanist and longtime Brookline resident who was a member of the faculties of Harvard University, the University of Pittsburgh and the McLean Hospital
- Victor Kac (born 1943), mathematician, MIT faculty, creator of Kac-Moody algebras, creator of Superalgebra
- Jeffrey Karp (born 1975), biomedical researcher
- Ruth Sager (1918–1997), plant geneticist
- Lawrence Summers, former Harvard president, former secretary of the treasury, and nephew of the Nobel Prize laureate Paul Samuelson

=== Musicians ===
- Ran Blake, jazz pianist and composer
- Roland Hayes (1887–1977), lyric tenor and composer
- Peter Ivers (1946–1983), musician, singer, songwriter, and television personality
- Louis Krasner (1903–1995), American violinist
- Tony Levin (born 1946), musician, bassist
- James Taylor (born 1948), musician, owns a home in Brookline

=== Politicians ===
- Bhumibol Adulyadej, king of Thailand, lived in Brookline during his infancy while his father the prince studied at Harvard Medical School
- Michael Bloomberg, businessman, mayor of New York City 2002–2012, lived in Brookline as a child
- Otis Clapp, politician (Massachusetts state representative and member of the old Boston City Council), homeopath, pharmacist, publisher, bookseller, and U.S. Internal Revenue Bureau collector
- Thomas Aspinwall Davis (1798–1845), businessman and mayor of Boston
- Michael Dukakis (born 1933), former governor of Massachusetts and 1988 Democratic presidential candidate
- Raffi Freedman-Gurspan, LGBTQ activist and first openly transgender White House staffer
- Sybil Holmes (1889–1979), first female member of the Massachusetts Senate
- John F. Kennedy (1917–1963), 35th president of the United States (1961–63), born and lived first 10 years of his life in Brookline
- Robert F. Kennedy (1925–1968), Attorney General, US Senator, brother of President John F. Kennedy, born in Brookline

=== Writers ===
- Linda Barnes, novelist
- Saul Bellow, Nobel Prize-winning novelist, lived the last 12 years of his life in Brookline
- Marita Bonner (1899–1971), writer, essayist, and playwright
- Richard Burgin, author, editor of Boulevard magazine
- Michael A. Burstein, science-fiction writer
- Ellen Goodman (born 1941), American journalist and Pulitzer Prize-winning syndicated columnist
- Susannah Heath (1795–1878), diarist

=== Other ===
- Jacob Bates Abbott, wildlife painter and illustrator, birdwatcher, conservationist
- Eddie Andelman, sports radio host and businessman, moved to Brookline as child, graduated from Brookline High
- Gisele Bündchen, supermodel and former wife of Tom Brady
- Ida Conquest, actress
- Zach Cone, creator and player of Biker Boy
- Alex Edelman, stand-up comedian
- Ray Ellin, comedian, host, writer, producer, podcaster
- Theo Epstein (born 1973), former Chicago Cubs President of Baseball Operations and former Boston Red Sox general manager
- Hank Eskin, webmaster of Where's George?
- Frederick Perry Fish (1855–1930), pioneering intellectual property attorney
- Terry Francona, manager of the Cincinnati Reds and former manager of the Boston Red Sox
- David Frankel, venture capitalist and entrepreneur
- Claude Fuess, 10th Headmaster of Phillips Academy Andover
- Peter Gammons, baseball writer and ESPN commentator
- King Gillette, popularizer of the safety razor
- Minnie Goodnow (1871–1952), WWI nurse and nurse educator
- John Hodgman (born 1971), author and contributor for This American Life and The Daily Show
- Levi Yitzchak Horowitz (1921–2009), the Bostoner Rebbe
- Isabella Howland (1895–1974), painter and sculptor
- Daniel Hoffer, an American entrepreneur and venture capitalist
- Richard Jones, US ambassador to Israel, lived in Brookline with his family
- Rosemary Kennedy (1918–2005), sister of President John F. Kennedy, born in Brookline
- Kathleen Agnes Kennedy (Kathleen Cavendish, Marchioness of Hartington) (1920–1948), sister of President John F. Kennedy, born in Brookline
- Eunice Kennedy Shriver (1921–2009), sister of President John F. Kennedy, born in Brookline
- Patricia Kennedy Lawford (1924–2006), sister of President John F. Kennedy, born in Brookline
- Louise Andrews Kent (1886–1969), author
- Robert Kraft (born 1941), New England Patriots owner
- Jon Krakauer (born 1954, raised in Corvallis, Oregon), author of Into the Wild and Into Thin Air, columnist for Outside magazine
- Michio, leader of the worldwide macrobiotic movement
- Amos Adams Lawrence (1814–1886), merchant and abolitionist
- Abbott Lawrence Lowell (1856–1943), former president of Harvard University
- Lester Lefton, president of Kent State University
- Clarence Cook Little (1888–1971), American geneticist, President of the University of Michigan
- Amy Lowell (1874–1925), poet
- Eddie Lowery (1903–1984), 10-year-old caddie of Francis Ouimet during 1913 U.S. Open held in Brookline
- Larry Lucchino (born 1945), co-owner of Boston Red Sox
- Ananda Mahidol, king of Thailand, lived during age 1–3 years in Brookline while his father the prince studied at Harvard Medical School
- Bob Margolin (born 1949), blues guitarist and former Muddy Waters sideman
- Albert and David Maysles, documentary filmmakers
- Arthur Chute McGill (1926–1980), theologian, philosopher, author and editor, Harvard professor 1971–1980
- Joey McIntyre, youngest member of musical group New Kids on the Block, lived in Brookline
- Henry J. Meade, Chief of Chaplains of the U.S. Air Force
- Jean Baker Miller (1927–2006), psychoanalyst, feminist, author, social activist
- Roger Miller, rock musician
- George Minot (1885–1950), winner of the 1934 Nobel Prize in Physiology or Medicine
- Abelardo Morell (born 1948), photographer, professor at Massachusetts College of Art
- Evelyn Murphy (born 1940), former lieutenant governor of Massachusetts
- William Murphy (1892–1987), winner of 1934 Nobel Prize in Physiology or Medicine
- Nicholas Nixon, photographer, professor at Massachusetts College of Art
- Joel Mark Noe (1943–1991), pioneering reconstructive plastic surgeon, longtime resident
- Conan O'Brien (born 1963), television host, comedian, writer, producer, podcaster
- Frederick Law Olmsted (1822–1903), landscape architect
- Lawrence Lessig (born 1961), Director of Harvard University's Edmond & Lily Safra Center for Ethics law school and founder of Creative Commons
- Francis Ouimet (1893–1967), amateur golfer who won the U.S. Open in 1913
- Miguel de Icaza (born 1972), founder of GNOME
- Edith Pearlman (1936–2023), short story writer
- Paul Pender (1930–2003), boxer, middleweight champion
- Esther Petrack, contestant on America's Next Top Model, Cycle 15
- Henry Varnum Poor, creator of the Standard & Poor's Index
- Alfredo Quiñones-Hinojosa, M.D., neurosurgeon and author
- Norman Ramsey (1915–2011), winner of the 1989 Nobel Prize in Physics
- Rishi Reddi, short story writer
- Elliot Richardson, lieutenant governor and attorney general of Massachusetts, cabinet official in the Nixon and Ford administrations, ambassador and lawyer
- Florida Ruffin Ridley (1861–1943), civil rights activist, suffragist, teacher, writer, and editor
- Steve Rochinski (born 1954), jazz guitarist, recording artist, composer, arranger, author, jazz educator
- John Rock (1890–1984), pioneer in the development of in vitro fertilization and the birth control pill
- Neil Rolde (born 1932), writer and Maine politician
- David L. Rose (born 1967), tech entrepreneur and scientist at the MIT Media Lab
- Dan Rosenthal (born 1966), Assistant to the President in White House under Bill Clinton
- Larry Ruttman (born 1931), attorney and author
- Ruth Sager (1918–1997), US geneticist, died in Brookline
- Ignatius Sargent, (1800-1884), merchant, member of the Boston Associates, horticulturalist, early benefactor of the Massachusetts Horticultural Society
- Arnold Schoenberg (1874–1951), composer, lived at 1280 Beacon Street during the 1930s
- Allison Sekuler, American neuroscientist
- Samuel Sewall (1652–1730), judge in the Salem witch trials
- Charles Sprague Sargent (1841–1927), first director of Harvard University's Arnold Arboretum
- Conrad Salinger (1901–1962), longtime orchestrator for MGM musicals
- Sarah Schechter (born 1976), film and television producer
- John H. Sherburne (1877–1959), U.S. Army brigadier general
- Bill Simmons, podcaster and sportswriter
- Joseph B. Soloveitchik (1903–1993), Jewish scholar
- Sarah Smith (born 1947), novelist
- Lawrence Summers, economist, president of Harvard University 2001–2006
- Cindy Stumpo, entrepreneur and residential contractor featured in numerous national publications
- David Susskind, (1920-1987), producer of TV, movies, and stage plays; TV talk show host.
- Paul Szep (born 1941), two-time Pulitzer Prize-winning political cartoonist
- Karen Tarlow (born 1947), composer
- Michelle Thomas (1968–1998), actress who played Justine Phillips on The Cosby Show and Myra Monkhouse on Family Matters
- Cyrus Veyssi, influencer
- Mike Wallace (1918–2012), TV journalist, best known for 60 Minutes
- Stephen Walt, professor of international relations, Harvard University
- Barbara Walters (1929–2022), television commentator and journalist
- Robert Weinberg, cancer researcher known for discovering a gene that causes normal cells to form tumors, and the first tumor suppressor gene
- David Weinberger, blogger, internet expert, and political consultant
- William A. Wellman (born 1896 in Brookline), director of Wings (1927)
- Mikey Welsh, former bassist for rock band Weezer, moved to Brookline in his youth
- Henry Melville Whitney (1839–1923), businessman and developer of the Beacon Street boulevard
- James Scollay Whitney (1811–1878), businessman and politician
- John Woodrow Wilson (1922–2015), lithographer, sculptor, painter, muralist, and art teacher
- Bob Woolf (1929-1993), Sports agent who represented athletes including Larry Bird, Carl Yastrzemski, John Havlicek and others
- Gary K. Wolf, author, creator of Roger Rabbit
- Danny Yamashiro, chaplain at Massachusetts Institute of Technology, researcher on American presidents and childhood trauma, and media host
- Moshe Yanai, electrical engineer and entrepreneur

== In popular culture ==
=== In film ===
- Scenes from American Hustle (2013) were filmed in Brookline.
- Scenes from The Next Karate Kid (1993) were filmed in Brookline.
- Scenes from American Fiction (2023) were filmed in Brookline.

=== In television ===
- June Osborne / Offred, the protagonist of The Handmaid's Tale (2017–present), is from Brookline.

=== In book ===
- Dr. Melisande Stokes, the protagonist of The Rise and Fall of D.O.D.O. time travels to Muddy River hamlet (first settlement of today Brookline).

== Sister cities ==
Brookline is twinned with:

- Quezalguaque, Nicaragua (since 1987)
- Also included under the two sister cities for the Commonwealth of Massachusetts, Hokkaido, Japan (since 1990). Basel-Stadt, Switzerland.

== See also ==
- Greater Boston
- European beech in the Longwood Mall
- Metropolitan area
- National Register of Historic Places listings in Brookline, Massachusetts
- Representative town meeting format
