= Susannah Heath =

American diarist (1795–1878)

- Born: September 11, 1795
- Died: March 24, 1878 (aged 82); Brookline
- Occupation: Diarist, painter
- Parent(s): Ebenezer Heath; Hannah Heath

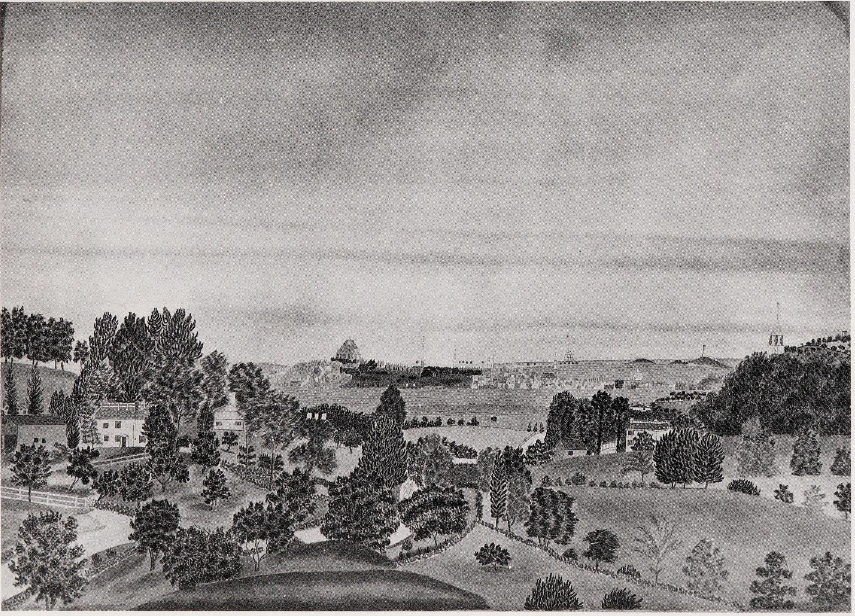
Heath's landscape of Boston from Brookline

Susannah or Susan Heath (September 11, 1795 – March 24, 1878) was an American diarist.

Susannah Heath was born on September 11, 1795, one of ten children of Ebenezer Heath and Hannah Williams Heath. The family lived in what is today called the Ebenezer Heath House in Brookline, Massachusetts.

Heath kept a 61-volume diary between 1812 and 1874. The diary is now owned by the Massachusetts Historical Society. The diary has been frequently cited in historical studies of diverse topics including Heath's contempt for her father, meeting the Marquis de Lafayette, Dorothea Dix, the medicinal use of arsenic, and indoor plumbing.

In 1813, Heath painted a watercolor landscape of the view of Boston from her home. Identifiable landmarks in the painting include the Massachusetts State House, the Worcester Turnpike, the Boston Neck, the Zabdiel Boylston House (demolished in 1863), the second building of the First Parish in Brookline, and the Great Elm on Boston Common.

Susannah Heath never married and died on 24 March 1878 in Brookline.
