= Allison Sekuler =

American neuroscientist

- Born: Brookline, Massachusetts, USA
- Spouse: Patrick John Bennett (m. 1991)

Academic background
- Education: BA, Pomona College; PhD, 1990, University of California, Berkeley
- Thesis: Speed discrimination in looming displays: critical elements of motion and integration (1991)

Allison Britt Sekuler is an American-born neuroscientist. In 2019, she was named one of Canada's Top 100 Most Powerful Women.

== Early life ==
Sekuler was born to parents Robert W. Sekuler and Susan N. Sekuler in Brookline, Massachusetts. Her father was the provost and the dean of the faculty at Brandeis University while her mother was a lawyer. She completed her Bachelor of Arts at Pomona College and her PhD at University of California, Berkeley.

== Career ==
Following her PhD, Sekuler began teaching at the University of Toronto's (U of T) Department of Psychology with her husband. While there, she also served as president and a board member of the Royal Canadian Institute. The couple remained at U of T for a decade before accepting a Canada Research Chair position at McMaster University in July 2001. Upon joining the faculty, Sekuler also established a laboratory of eye trackers and scanning machines to continue her research into face and object recognition.

As a Canada Research Chair in Cognitive Neuroscience, Sekuler focused on how the human brain processes visual information, and how that processing changes as a function of aging. She also focused on face perception, motion perception, object recognition, perceptual organization, visual attention, perceptual learning, and pattern vision. As such, Sekuler was recognized as a Canadian "Leader of Tomorrow" in 2004 by the Partnership Group for Science and Engineering and Natural Sciences and Engineering Research Council. Following this, Sekuler discovered that the aging process improves their ability to grasp big picture concepts through the use of computer-generated stimuli. She later received the Hamilton Spectator Publisher's Award for Educators in recognition of her "devotion and efforts toward increasing public science outreach."

In 2017, Sekuler left McMaster after being named the next Vice-president Research and Sandra A. Rotman Chair at Baycrest Health Sciences in Toronto. In this role, she was also appointed the managing director of the Centre for Aging + Brain Health Innovation. In 2019, Sekuler was recognized by the Women's Executive Network as one of Canada's Most Powerful Women in the Science and Technology category.

== Personal life ==
Sekuler and her husband Patrick Bennett have two children together.
