= Ivy Street School =

Location
- 200 Ivy Street; Brookline, MA 02445
- Coordinates: 42.3475°N 71.1131°W

Information
- School type: Private School, Non-profit, Special Education, Day and Residential School
- Established: 1993; 33 years ago
- Headmaster: Brooke Howard
- Grades: ages 13-22
- Enrollment: 44 (2018-19)
- Average class size: 7
- Student to teacher ratio: 1:3
- Color: green
- Mascot: Hawks
- Team name: Hawks
- Website: ivystreetschool.org

The Ivy Street School is a school that offers multiple programs aimed at providing the skills and healing for neurodivergent youth to thrive. Through its educational, residential, and community-based programs, Ivy Street supports adolescents and young adults with disabilities by strengthening healing, deepening community, building skills and accelerating motivation for a successful adulthood.

The Ivy Street School was founded in 1993 for adolescents with brain injuries and other neurological challenges. The school has since expanded its scope to serve a more diverse group of adolescents and young adults with disabilities. Ivy Street serves students between the ages of 13 and 22 with Autism Spectrum Disorder, neurological and neurodevelopmental diagnoses, learning disabilities, and mental health diagnoses.

The school is located in Brookline, Massachusetts in a residential neighborhood a few miles from downtown Boston. Residential programs are located in Brookline, Massachusetts, as well. Skills for Life programming is home and community based.

== Ivy Street School Programs ==
The Ivy Street School offers high school, postsecondary, residential, and vocational support to its students.

Within the school, Ivy Street supports learning and skill development through high school and postsecondary education. All students receive instruction from special education teachers who provide individualized learning that allows students to access their education in ways that are meaningful to them. Students participate in traditional high school classes across the sciences, math, English and social studies, as well as music and physical education. Additional offerings include mindfulness, social mechanics, community navigation, and a daily elective choice block.

The school offers two postsecondary classrooms focused on skill development for independent living, social skills, meaningful relationships, vocational choices, and self-direction. The postsecondary program centers around preparation for the students' transition from Ivy Street and individualized to students' own goals for their adult lives. In addition to class time, postsecondary students hold jobs and internships and enroll in additional courses at local colleges and universities.

The school's Vocational Program provides opportunities for career development and growth. Through direct instruction, campus-based work opportunities, community-based experiences, and supported competitive employment, students explore their vocational goals and develop job skills that allow them to find success in work.

The Ivy Street School offers two residential programs: Foundations and the Cottage Farm Program. The Foundations residential program on Ivy Street's main campus provides structured skill development and recreational opportunities to 16 students as they practice and master life skills. Two blocks from the main campus, the Cottage Farm Program houses 10 students who are seeking to develop independent living skills. Both residential programs are supported by staff at all hours.

The Ivy Street School staff includes special education teachers, clinical and restorative therapists, vocational counselors, residential staff, and registered nurses. Support is provided to students' families through regular meetings, family therapy, and a Family Empowerment and Learning Academy that allows families opportunity for skill development, therapeutic support, and community building.

== External Programs ==
Ivy Street's Skills for Life Program supports young adults in developing greater independence through supported skill development and executive functioning. Occupational therapists support young adults within their homes and communities to work with clients on developing the skills they need to help them meet their goals. Through weekly or bi-weekly sessions, Skills for Life's occupational therapists help clients work on the goals that matter most to them, including at-home skills, financial literacy, health and wellness, transportation, and social and recreational skills.

Skills for Life serves clients within a 40-mile radius of Brookline, Massachusetts and Providence, Rhode Island.

Skills for Life also offers community-based events, activity groups and affinity spaces for its clients.
