= Florida Ruffin Ridley School =

K-8 school in Brookline, Massachusetts

Coordinates: 42°20′40.35″N 71°07′26.19″W

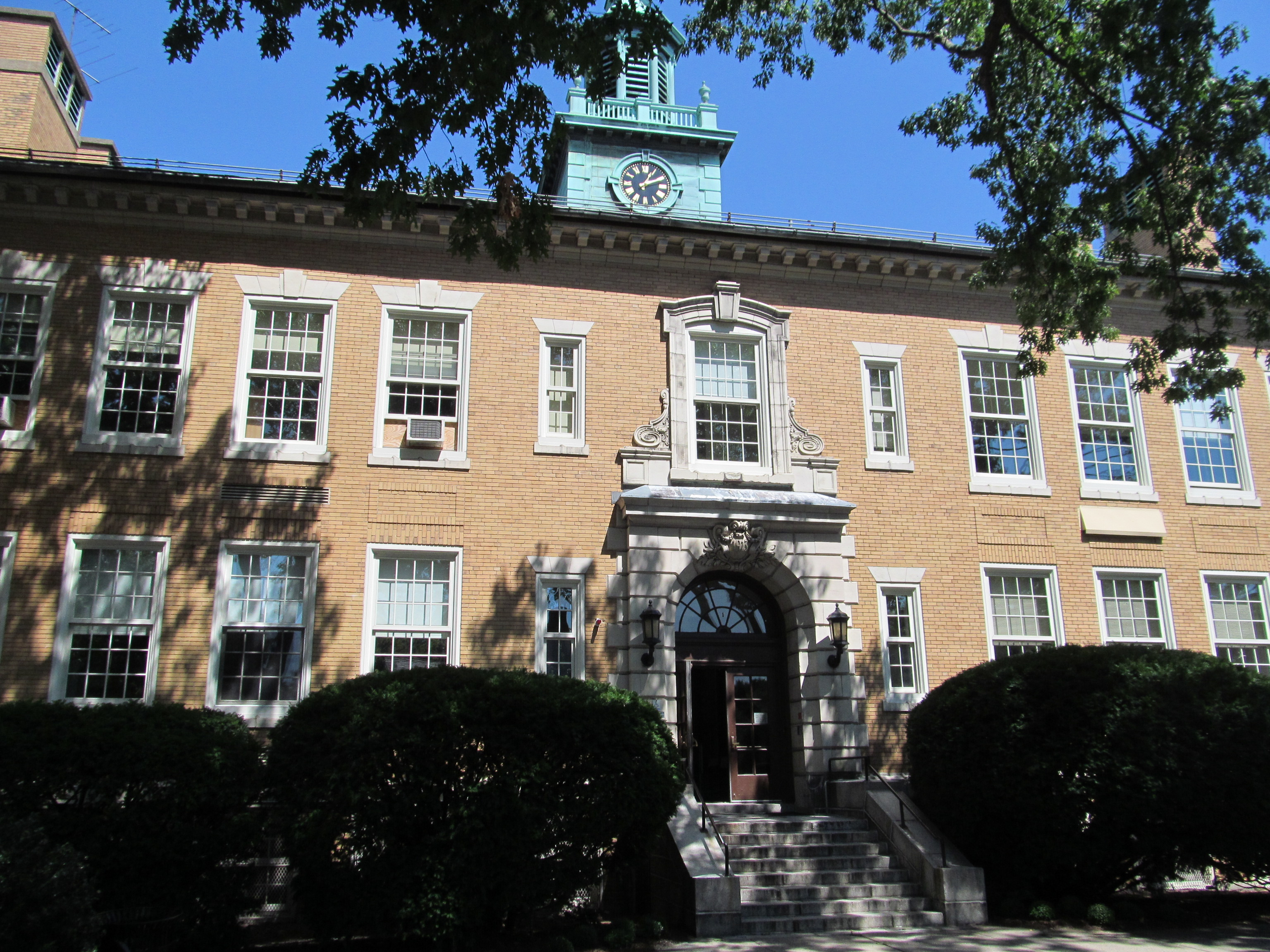
- 345 Harvard Street; Brookline, MA 02446

Information
- Type: K-8 school
- Established: 1892
- School district: Public Schools of Brookline
- Principal: Sara Yuen; Steven Simolaris; Emma Gardiner; Marianne O'Grady
- Grades: K-8
- Enrollment: 798
- Student to teacher ratio: 11.6
- Mascot: Bees
- Website: Florida Ruffin Ridley School

The Florida Ruffin Ridley School, formerly known as the Coolidge Corner School and the Edward Devotion School or Devo, is a public K-8 school located at 345 Harvard Street, Brookline, Massachusetts, United States. It is a part of Public Schools of Brookline.

The school was founded in 1892 on land formerly owned by Edward Devotion (1621-1685) and later by his grandson, another Edward Devotion (1667-1744). The land was purchased by the town from a later owner. The Devotions' 18th-century house is preserved by the Town of Brookline and managed as a house museum by the Brookline Historical Society and stands amidst part of its original gardens in the school's forecourt.

The Devotion School in Brookline was renamed because its original namesake, Edward Devotion, was a slaveholder. Community members and town officials decided that it was no longer appropriate for a public school to bear the name of someone who enslaved people, especially given Brookline’s commitment to racial equity, diversity, and inclusion. Following a public process, it was permanently renamed in 2019 to honor Florida Ruffin Ridley, an African American civil rights leader and suffragist who lived in Brookline.

== Demographics ==
The school is attended by over 800 students from pre-kindergarten to eighth grade, and is the largest of eight public elementary schools in Brookline. The school emphasizes diversity, with English being a second language to over one third of the student body, among which about 40% are English language learners. Roughly 37% of students are non-white or multiracial.

== Student life ==
The school has a Parent Teacher Organization supporting activities including field trips, "Arts Council," a science fair, Math night, and an International Night.

== Renovation ==
The school was reconstructed and enlarged (completed in August, 2018). For the 2016-2017 and 2017-2018 academic years, the student body was split between two temporary buildings, termed Lower Devotion School (grades K-4) and Upper Devotion School (grades 5-8). The principals of Lower Devotion were David O'Hara and Jennifer Buller, and the principal of Upper Devotion was Monica Crowley.

== History ==
Built in 1892, the school was named for the second Edward Devotion, who decreed in his will that any money left over after the payments of his debt and funeral expenses be given to the town for use "towards Building or Maintaining a School as near the Centre of the said Town as shall be agreed upon by the Town." Although the money was long gone by the time school was built, the school was apparently named for him in recognition of his original request, although no records from the 1890s survive discussing the naming.

John F. Kennedy attended the school from 1922 to 1924.

Until 2005, the school librarian was award-winning author Norman H. Finkelstein, who wrote the book The Other 1492 (not to be confused with the similarly named professor Norman Finkelstein).

In 2018, a citizen-led movement endorsed by Brookline's Town Meeting and School Committee began the process of renaming the school, recognizing that the estate of Edward Devotion sold for his bequest included a slave. In May 2018 the name was changed to the Coolidge Corner School pending a new name. The name was changed to the Florida Ruffin Ridley School as of September 2020, following the vote of Town Meeting in November 2019.

== Notable alumni ==
- John F. Kennedy, 35th President of the United States (kindergarten through 3rd grade)
- Ada Korkhin (born 2004), Olympic pistol shooter
