= Saint Mary of the Assumption Church, Rectory, School and Convent =

Historic church in Massachusetts, United States

- U.S. National Register of Historic Places
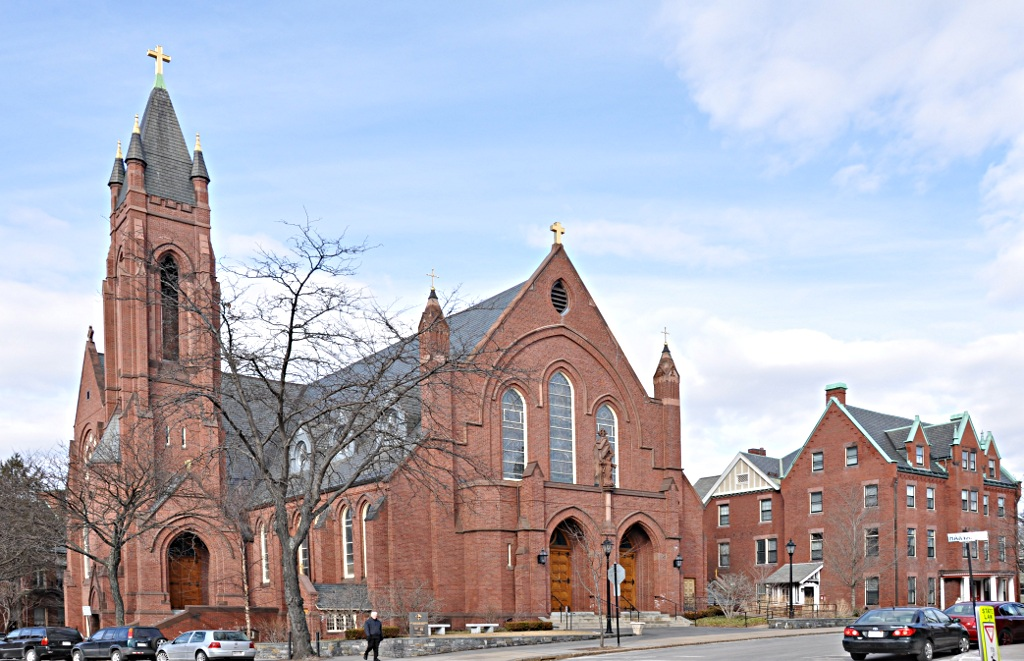

- Location within Massachusetts Location within the United States
- Location: 67 Harvard Street, and 3 and 5 Linden Place, Brookline, Massachusetts
- Coordinates: 42°20′6″N 71°7′11″W
- Area: 2 acres (0.81 ha)
- Built: 1880
- Architect: Peabody and Stearns
- Architectural style: Late Gothic Revival, Brick Gothic Revival
- Website: www.stmarybrookline.com
- MPS: Brookline MRA
- NRHP reference No.: 85003311
- Added to NRHP: October 17, 1985

Saint Mary of the Assumption Church, Rectory, School and Convent is a historic church complex at 67 Harvard Street, and 3 and 5 Linden Place, in Brookline, Massachusetts in the Archdiocese of Boston. It was the first Roman Catholic Church in Brookline, and the first in the nation to bear the name. Most of its buildings were built between 1880 and 1906, and are reflective of the growth of the area's Irish immigrant community during that time. The complex was listed on the National Register of Historic Places in 1985.

== Architecture and history ==
The parish, established in 1852, was the first in Brookline. The Saint Mary of the Assumption complex occupies a parcel of land on the northern fringe of Brookline Village, bounded by Harvard Street, Linden Place, Hurd Road, and Homer Street. The church stands at the northeast corner of Harvard and Linden, with the other buildings arrayed to its north and east.

The buildings of the complex, except for the convent, were built between 1880 and 1906 and were designed by Peabody and Stearns. The convent is a c. 1843 Greek Revival house moved from the Linden Place area in 1899, and then enlarged and finished in brick.

The church is a red brick Gothic Revival structure with brownstone trim, featuring a tower that is 146 feet (45 m) in height. It has a basically cruciform plan, with a rounded apse and the tower set at the southwest corner of the crossing point. The main entrance is at its southern end, and has two arched doorways and a niche above for a statue of the Virgin Mary. The interior walls are lined with Kilkenny marble and onyx, and the altar of Caen stone with marble trim.

The rectory is a 3 1/2-story Panel Brick structure with a steeply pitched slate roof.

The school is an H-shaped 2 1/2-story structure, built like the church in a Gothic Revival style. Its entrance is in the center portion of the H, under a Tudor arch. The school formerly included a high school.

== See also ==
- Roman Catholic Archdiocese of Boston
- National Register of Historic Places listings in Brookline, Massachusetts
- National Register of Historic Places listings in Norfolk County, Massachusetts
