= Ray Ellin =

Comedy career
- Medium: Stand up comedian, actor, writer, producer, talk show host
- Genres: Observational comedy, Satire/Political satire, Social commentary
- Subjects: American culture, American politics, current events, pop culture
- Website: rayellin.com

Ray Ellin is an American comedian, talk show host, producer, writer, and director.

== Career ==
Ellin performs at comedy clubs around the United States. He hosted and wrote for the syndicated shows The Movie Loft, Premium TV, New York Now, and BrainFuel TV. He also hosts the web-based talk show LateNet with Ray Ellin.

Ellin produced and directed the film The Latin Legends Of Comedy, which he financed on his own six credit cards. Ellin co-starred in the film Killing Cinderella opposite Jessica Capshaw. In 2011, Ellin became the host of the Gong Show Live, a resurrection of television show. In 2012, he became the host of the television show Worth The Wait.

In 2013, Ellin opened Aruba Ray's Comedy Club on the island of Aruba.

In 2018, Ellin became executive producer of the television show This Week at the Comedy Cellar. The show was sold to Comedy Central, and wrapped season three in early 2020.

== Personal ==
Ellin moved to New York City after college. He moved around many times, at one point sleeping in the front seat of his Dodge Aspen.

== Awards ==
- 2009: Ellin was named one of "New York's Best Emerging Artists".
- 2006: Ellin received a Proclamation from the City of New York for his contributions to comedy.
- His film The Latin Legends Of Comedy won the jury award at the Boston International Film Festival.
