= Irwin Freedberg =

American dermatologist

Irwin M. Freedberg
- Born: 1933; Brookline, Massachusetts, US
- Died: July 17, 2005 (aged 71–72); New York City, US
- Education: Dartmouth College; Harvard Medical School
- Occupation: dermatologist

Irwin Mark Freedberg (c. 1933, Brookline, Massachusetts – July 17, 2005, New York City) was an American dermatologist. He taught dermatology at Harvard Medical School, was director of the department of dermatology at Johns Hopkins University, was the first chief of dermatology at Beth Israel Hospital, and was the George Miller MacKee Professor and chairman of the Ronald O. Perelman Department of Dermatology at the New York University Medical Center. He studied the protein keratin (the main component of hair, nails, and skin) and keratinocytes (the most common cells in the epidermis).

== Biography ==
He received his undergraduate degree from Dartmouth College and earned his medical degree at Harvard Medical School in 1956, and performed his dermatology residency at the Massachusetts General Hospital from 1959 to 1962. He then taught at Harvard from 1962 to 1977, eventually as a professor of dermatology. He moved to Johns Hopkins University, where he was director of the department of dermatology until 1981.

He was the first chief of dermatology at Beth Israel Hospital. Subsequently, he was the George Miller MacKee Professor and chairman of the Ronald O. Perelman Department of Dermatology at the New York University Medical Center, New York, from 1981 through 2005.

Freedberg studied the protein keratin (the main component of hair, nails, and skin) and keratinocytes (the most common cells in the epidermis).

He was the former editor in chief of The Journal of Investigative Dermatology. He also was a co-editor for a number of editions of Fitzpatrick's Dermatology in General Medicine; Freedberg; et al., eds. (2003). Fitzpatrick's Dermatology in General Medicine (6th ed.). McGraw-Hill. ISBN 0-07-138067-1.

In 1995, he was elected to the National Academy of Sciences' Institute of Medicine. Freedberg was named president of the American Dermatologic Association in 1997. He was a former president of the Association of Professors of Dermatology and of the American Board of Dermatology.

He died from a brain tumor at the age of 74 in New York City on July 17, 2005.
