= Christening cap =

Headgear

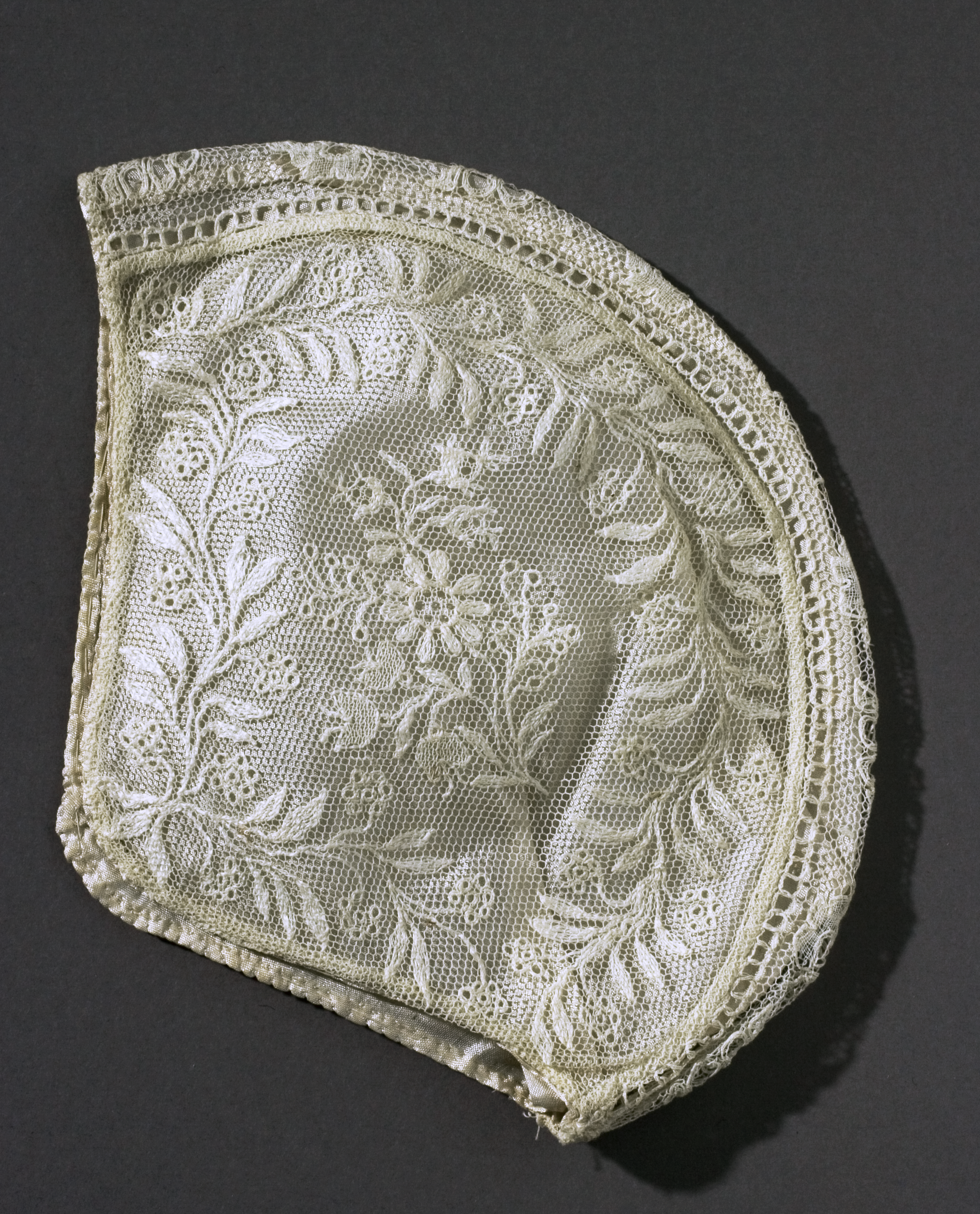
Girl's christening cap, embroidered tulle, 1828, coll. Livrustkammaren, Stockholm, Sweden.

Christening celebration

Christening cap was a headgear of 18th-and early 19th-century. The smallest cap in the collections of Den Gamle By is made of striped silk with linen in tabby weave. It has the measurements approximately a size of woman's fist, from forehead to the back of the neck it measures around 15.5 cm.

== See also ==
- Baptism
- List of headgear
