= Alice Ettinger =

German-American radiologist

- Born: October 8, 1899; Berlin, Germany
- Died: April 14, 1993 (aged 94); Norwood, Massachusetts, US
- Occupation: Physician
- Medical career
- Field: Radiology
- Institutions: Tufts University School of Medicine, New England Medical Center, Boston Dispensary

Alice Ettinger (October 8, 1899 – April 14, 1993) was a prominent radiologist and professor of medicine. A native of Germany, Ettinger trained there before coming to the Tufts University School of Medicine. She had come for a visit to Boston to demonstrate the spot film imaging technique, and she decided to stay at Tufts permanently.

Ettinger was associated with the school until she was 86 years old. She won recognition from several radiology societies, and Tufts established an endowed chair in her name. The spot film technique greatly enhanced X-ray diagnostic capabilities in the United States, particularly in gastrointestinal imaging.

== Early life and education ==
Born in Berlin, Germany on October 8, 1899, Ettinger attended school at Chamisso Gymnasium in Berlin and was a member of the graduating class of 1919. Ettinger went on to pursue a medical degree at the Albert Ludwig University in Freiberg. She graduated in 1924, and she completed her residency and training in internal medicine and radiology at the Second Clinic of Charite, affiliated with Friedrich Wilhelm University.

Upon completion of her residency, Ettinger went to work for Dr. Hans Heinrich Berg, who was world-renowned for his work in roentgenology. He invented a new device that allowed fluoroscopic images to be captured and printed onto X-ray film. Fluoroscopy was a popular X-ray technique at the time, but the disadvantage to this method was that it did not leave a permanent image on film until Berg's device was introduced.

== Move to the U.S. ==
In 1932, after Ettinger had worked under Berg's tutelage and guidance for more than two years, Dr. Joseph Pratt of Tufts Medical School and Boston Dispensary wrote to Berg and requested one of his revolutionary devices as well as a member of his team to demonstrate its usage; Ettinger was selected for the task. She traveled from Berlin to Boston with the spot film device in her luggage. Ettinger was only going to stay in the United States for six weeks, but she permanently relocated to Boston, joining the faculty of the Tufts University School of Medicine. Ettinger's introduction of the spot film opened up the possibility of modern gastrointestinal imaging capabilities in the United States.

Seven years after her arrival, Ettinger became the first radiologist-in-chief at both the Boston Dispensary and New England Medical Center Hospital in 1939. She then launched the Tufts radiology residency program and was involved in the creation of the Northeastern University program for X-ray technicians, one of the first of its kind. Ettinger was announced as a professor and chairwoman of radiology at Tufts School of Medicine in 1959.

Ettinger was one of the first radiologists to recognize that the dye used in common imaging practices could damage a patient's kidneys. As a Jewish-German immigrant herself, Ettinger worked to help place other Jewish immigrants with jobs during World War II.

== Honors and awards ==
In 1982, Ettinger received a Gold Medal from the Radiology Society of North America and in 1984 she won the Gold Medal Award from the American College of Radiology for distinguished service and dedication to the field of radiology. The American Association for Women Radiologists presents the Alice Ettinger Distinguished Achievement Award to recognize a career of service to the association and to the radiology profession.

During her time as a professor, her students selected her to receive the faculty teaching award for thirteen consecutive years. There is an endowed position in her name at the Tufts Medical School, known as the "Ettinger-Dreyfuss Chair of Radiology".

== Later life ==
Ettinger retired from the position of chairwoman in 1965, but continued as a practicing physician and professor until her retirement in 1985. She remained associated with Tufts' radiology teaching program until she was 86 years old. In 1993, Ettinger died of pneumonia in a nursing home in Norwood, Massachusetts.
