= Braggiotti =

Braggiotti is a surname. Notable people with the surname include:

- Enrico Braggiotti (1923–2019), Turkish-born Monegasque banker
- Francesca Braggiotti (1902–1998), Italian dancer, actress, and first lady of Connecticut, US
- Gerardo Braggiotti, Italian banker
- Gloria Braggiotti Etting (1909–2003), Italian dancer
- Mario Braggiotti (1905–1996), American pianist
