= William McCarty-Cooper =

American interior designer and philanthropist

Billy McCarty-Cooper
- Born: William Augustine McCarty; July 5, 1937; Miami Springs, Florida, US
- Died: May 30, 1991 (aged 53); Los Angeles, California, US
- Education: University of Pennsylvania
- Occupations: Interior decorator, collector
- Partner(s): Douglas Cooper; David Johnson

William Augustine McCarty-Cooper (July 5, 1937 – May 30, 1991) was an American interior designer based in London and philanthropist.

== Early life ==
William "Billy" McCarty was born on July 5, 1937, and raised in Miami Springs, Florida. He was the son of Eugenie and William A. McCarty. He had two brothers, Terrence McCarty and John McCarty, and two sisters, Patricia (née McCarty) Hawkins and Denise (née McCarty) Black.

Billy came to Philadelphia to study architecture at the University of Pennsylvania. While at Penn, he befriended Gloria Braggiotti Etting, the daughter of an Italian aristocrat who had married a Boston Brahmin. Gloria was the wife of artist Emlen Etting and introduced Billy to Douglas Cooper and Henry McIlhenny.

== Career ==
After moving to London in 1963 to work for decorator David Nightingale Hicks (husband to Lady Pamela Mountbatten), he became one of the most prominent decorators in London. Two years later in 1965, he opened his own firm, known as William McCarty Associates, to design interiors and furnishings, including for drawing rooms for the Rothschild family and salons for Vidal Sassoon in Beverly Hills.

In the late 1970s, he was associated with the Paris-based art and antiques gallery Didier Aaron. He created interiors for the firm in Paris, London and New York City.

=== Philanthropy ===
In 1986, McCarty-Cooper donated Three Women Under a Tree', an important proto-Cubist painting by Pablo Picasso, to the Musée Picasso in Paris. Under his stewardship, the Cooper Collection was widely exhibited throughout Europe and the United States, including at the Los Angeles County Museum of Art. In his later years, McCarty-Cooper collected Art Deco furniture, silver, rare books, and African art.

== Personal life ==
In 1972, he was adopted by Douglas Cooper, the British art historian and prominent collector of the Cubist period. The adoption "took place in France, where by law a son is automatically entitled to at least one half of his father’s estate. Such an arrangement, where the adoptee is not an orphan, is not uncommon in the world of the arts and society. Cooper's friend Jean Cocteau, for example, had adopted his young friend Eduard Dermit. In Cooper’s case, it was also a way of keeping his wealth from falling into the hands of his hated birth family." McCarty-Cooper then devoted most of his time to collecting and philanthropy. After Cooper died in 1984, McCarty-Cooper made available to scholars and the public Cooper's rarely exhibited collection of Cubist art.

McCarty-Cooper died of complications from AIDS in Los Angeles, California on May 30, 1991. At the time of his death, his partner was David Johnson of London. He left the bulk of his estate, divided into thirty-four equal parts, to his brothers, sisters, nephews, parents and a handful of friends. The collection was auctioned off at Christie's.

=== Honours and legacy ===
In February 1991, he was awarded the Commander of the Order of Arts and Letters by the French Government.

== Art collection ==
Artwork from the Leonard A. Lauder Cubist Collection formerly owned by McCarty-Cooper:

- Trees at L'Estaque by Georges Braque (1908)
- Still Life with Metronome (Still Life with Mandola and Metronome) by Georges Braque (1909)
- Nude in an Armchair by Pablo Picasso (1909)
- Still Life with Dice by Georges Braque (1911)
- Standing Female Nude by Pablo Picasso (1906–7)
- Head of a Man by Pablo Picasso (1908)
- The Chocolate Pot by Pablo Picasso (1909)
- Standing Woman by Pablo Picasso (1912)
- Composition with Violin by Pablo Picasso (1912)
- Man Leaning on a Table with Playing Cards by Pablo Picasso (1914)
- Bearded Man Playing Guitar by Pablo Picasso (1914)
- Fruit Dish and Glass by Georges Braque (1912)
- Still Life (The Tobacco Pouch) by Juan Gris (1918)
- Houses in Paris, Place Ravignan by Juan Gris (1911/2)
- Head of a Woman (Portrait of the Artist's Mother) by Juan Gris (1912)
- Still Life by Fernand Léger (1913)
- Drawing for "The Card Game" by Fernand Léger (1917)
- The Tugboat (recto); Related sketch (verso) by Fernand Léger (1918)
- Two Figures with Dog by Fernand Léger (1920)
- Sugar Bowl and Fan by Pablo Picasso (1909)
