= Pill Hill, Brookline, Massachusetts =

Coordinates: 42°19′39.2″N 71°7′9.4″W

- Neighborhood of Brookline, Massachusetts
- Interactive map of Pill Hill, Brookline, Massachusetts
- Country: United States
- State: Massachusetts
- County: Norfolk
- City: Brookline
- ZIP Codes: 02445
- Area code: 617

Pill Hill, also known as "High Street Hill," is a neighborhood of Brookline, Massachusetts, United States, and part of Greater Boston.

== History ==
Pill Hill became part of Brookline in 1844, when it was annexed from Boston.

Noted abolitionist Samuel Philbrick lived in Brookline at 182 Walnut Street during the mid-19th century. His home eventually became a stop for the Underground Railroad.

Like other Pill Hills in the United States, Pill Hill in Brookline was nicknamed for the large numbers of doctors in the neighborhood. That was likely due to its proximity to hospitals in the Longwood Medical and Academic Area of Boston. "High Street Hill" is the older and more formal name for the neighborhood. The neighborhood has been listed on the National Register of Historic Places as the Pill Hill Historic District. Pill Hill is one of seven Local Historic Districts in Brookline.

== Geography ==
=== Settlement and borders ===
Pill Hill is centered along High Street, but also includes Allerton Street and Cumberland and Pond Avenues, and Hawthorn, Glen and Edgehill Roads.

Pill Hill immediately borders other Brookline neighborhoods, including Brookline Village to its north and the historically working-class neighborhood known as The Point ("Whiskey Point") to its south. Pill Hill also lies adjacent to Olmsted Park and Leverett Pond to its east (part of Greater Boston's Emerald Necklace park system); parkland which in turn borders the Boston neighborhoods of Jamaica Plain and Mission Hill.

The neighborhood is also near Route 9, a major Massachusetts highway.

=== Climate ===
Climate data for Brookline, MA
Month	Jan	Feb	Mar	Apr	May	Jun	Jul	Aug	Sep	Oct	Nov	Dec	Year
Record high °F (°C)	72.0 (22.2)	70.0 (21.1)	89.0 (31.7)	94.0 (34.4)	97.0 (36.1)	100.0 (37.8)	104.0 (40.0)	102.0 (38.9)	102.0 (38.9)	90.0 (32.2)	83.0 (28.3)	76.0 (24.4)	104.0 (40.0)
Mean daily maximum °F (°C)	36.0 (2.2)	39.0 (3.9)	45.0 (7.2)	56.0 (13.3)	66.0 (18.9)	76.0 (24.4)	82.0 (27.8)	80.0 (26.7)	72.0 (22.2)	61.0 (16.1)	52.0 (11.1)	41.0 (5.0)	58.83 (14.91)
Mean daily minimum °F (°C)	22.0 (−5.6)	25.0 (−3.9)	31.0 (−0.6)	41.0 (5.0)	50.0 (10.0)	60.0 (15.6)	65.0 (18.3)	65.0 (18.3)	57.0 (13.9)	47.0 (8.3)	38.0 (3.3)	28.0 (−2.2)	44.08 (6.71)
Record low °F (°C)	−30.0 (−34.4)	−18.0 (−27.8)	−8.0 (−22.2)	11.0 (−11.7)	31.0 (−0.6)	41.0 (5.0)	50.0 (10.0)	46.0 (7.8)	34.0 (1.1)	25.0 (−3.9)	−2.0 (−18.9)	−17.0 (−27.2)	−30.0 (−34.4)
Average precipitation inches (mm)	3.36 (85)	3.38 (86)	4.32 (110)	3.74 (95)	3.49 (89)	3.68 (93)	3.43 (87)	3.35 (85)	3.44 (87)	3.94 (100)	3.99 (101)	3.78 (96)	43.9 (1,120)

Brookline falls under the USDA 6b Plant Hardiness zone.

== Demographics ==
The most commonly reported ethnicities/ancestries in Pill Hill are Irish (20.7%), various Asian ancestries (14.6%), English (6.7%), Italian (6.5%), and Russian (6.1%). Additionally, 2.4% of those living in Pill Hill have Spanish ancestry.

17.9% of Pill Hill residents are foreign born.

=== Languages ===
The most common language spoken in Pill Hill is English, spoken by 72.9% of households. Other languages spoken in the neighborhood include Spanish, Mandarin Chinese, and French.

== Culture ==
Pill Hill is mostly residential but also has places of commerce, particularly operating along Boylston Street/Route 9.

=== Architecture ===
The Pill Hill neighborhood of Brookline has various examples of Victorian architecture.

== Sites ==
- Philbrick Square, a park designed by Frederick Law Olmsted in the 1880s, is located in Pill Hill.
- The historic Free Hospital for Women has been located in Pill Hill since 1895.
- The historic Hotel Adelaide is located in Pill Hill on High Street. Hotel Adelaide is no longer a functioning hotel, however, and instead presently serves as residential apartments.
- Eliphalet Spurr House, 103 Walnut Street, oldest building in Pill Hill

== Public transportation ==
=== Light rail and subway ===
Pill Hill's close proximity to Brookline Village, allows for easy access to the MBTA's Green Line D-train at Brookline Village (MBTA station). Additionally, Pill Hill is in close proximity to the Green Line E-train line in the Mission Hill neighborhood of Boston, notably the Riverway stop.

Both D and E lines of the MBTA's Green Line have service to downtown Boston.

=== Bus ===
Pill Hill is also served by MBTA bus service.

== Education ==
=== Public schools ===
The local public school is the William H. Lincoln School.

== Notable people ==
- Arthur Bowditch, architect, designed and lived at 12 Maple St.
- Gloria Braggiotti, dancer and writer, lived at 78 Upland Rd. as a child
- Mario Braggiotti, pianist, lived at 78 Upland Rd. as a child
- John W. Candler, politician, lived at 99 High St.
- William Bosworth Castle, physician and physiologist, lived at 22 Irving St.
- Walter Channing, physician, lived at 138 High St.
- Sara R. Ehrmann, civic leader, lived at 14 Irving St.
- Carl Fehmer, architect, lived at 70 Upland Rd.
- Max Fiedler, conductor, lived at 100 High St.
- Prescott F. Hall, lawyer, lived at 127 High St.
- Roland Hayes, lyric tenor and composer, lived at 58 Allerton St. for 50 years
- Helen Hopekirk, pianist and composer, lived at 169 Walnut St.
- Walter Harrington Kilham, architect and Kilham & Hopkins partner, designed and lived at 33 Edgehill Rd.
- Arthur Dehon Little, chemist, lived at 107 Upland Rd.
- Judith Eleanor Motley Low, architect and founder of Lowthorpe School of Landscape Architecture, lived at 28 Allerton St.
- Arthur Nikisch, conductor, lived at 100 High St. in 1889
- Robert Swain Peabody, architect and Peabody & Stearns partner, designed numerous houses in Pill Hill, designed and lived at 50 Edgehill Rd.
- Samuel Philbrick, abolitionist, lived in Pill Hill in the mid-19th century
- John Rock, obstetrician and gynecologist, lived at 28 Allerton St.
- John Daniel Runkle, president of MIT, lived at 84 High St.
- John H. Sherburne, attorney and politician, lived at 92 High St.
- Moorfield Storey, lawyer and civil rights leader, lived at 44 Edgehill Rd.
- Charles Storer Storrow, civil engineer and industrialist, lived at 70 Upland Rd. from 1878 to 1885
- Charles Pickard Ware, educator, music transcriber, and abolitionist, lived at 195 Walnut St. in the 1880s

== Photo gallery ==
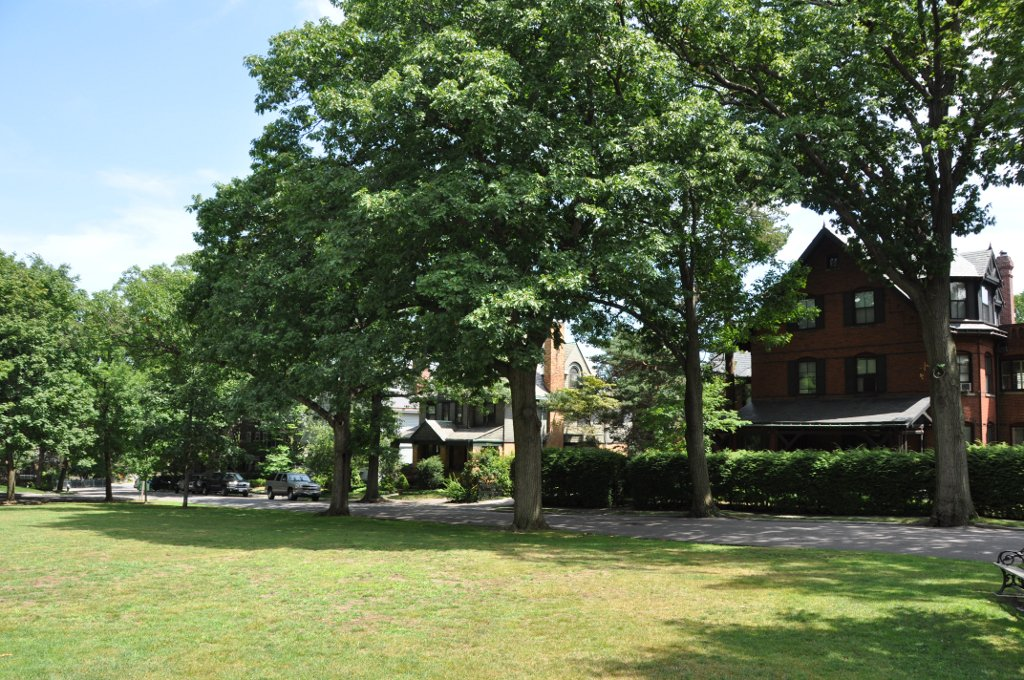
Philbrick Square.

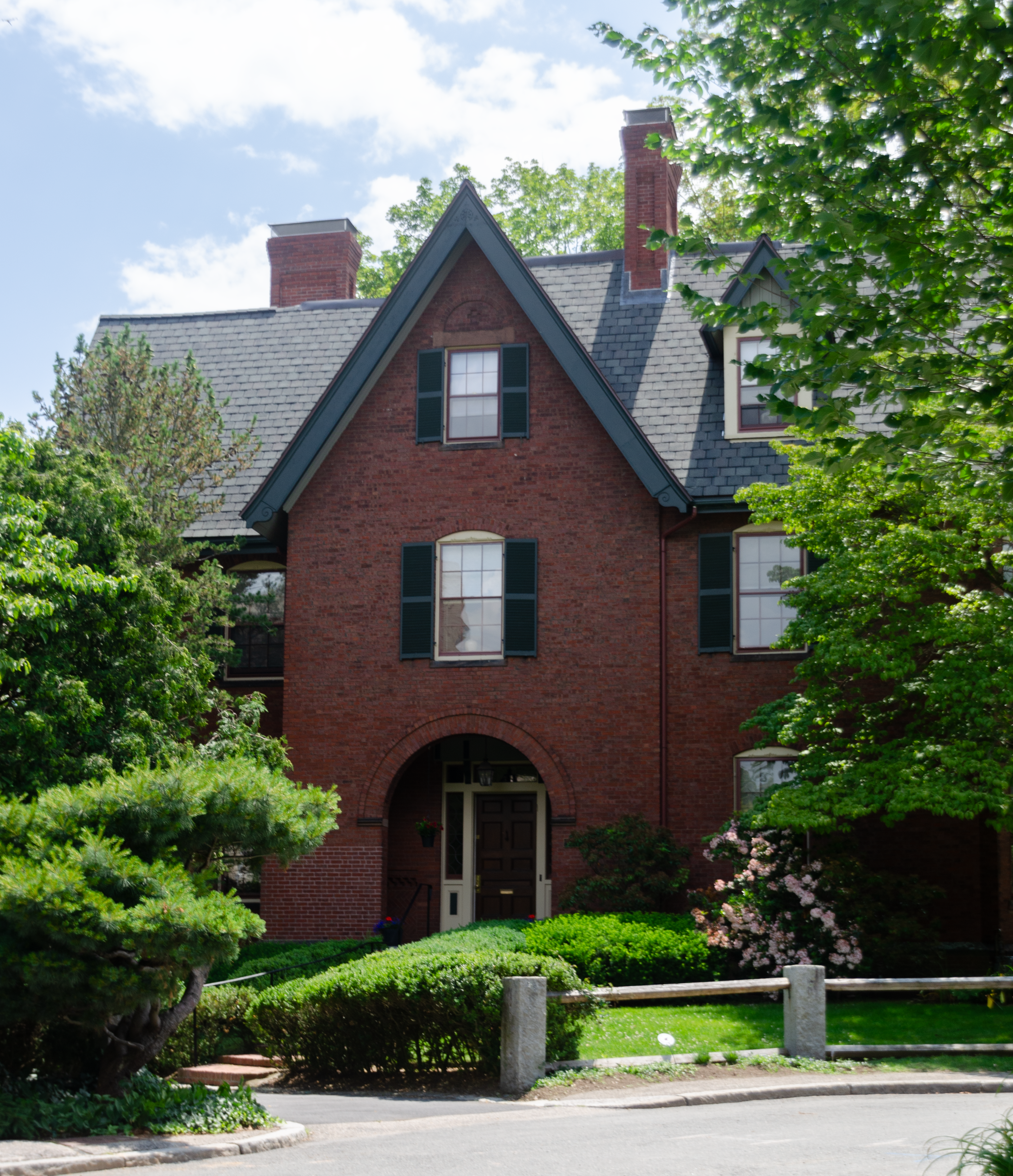
44 Edgehill Rd.

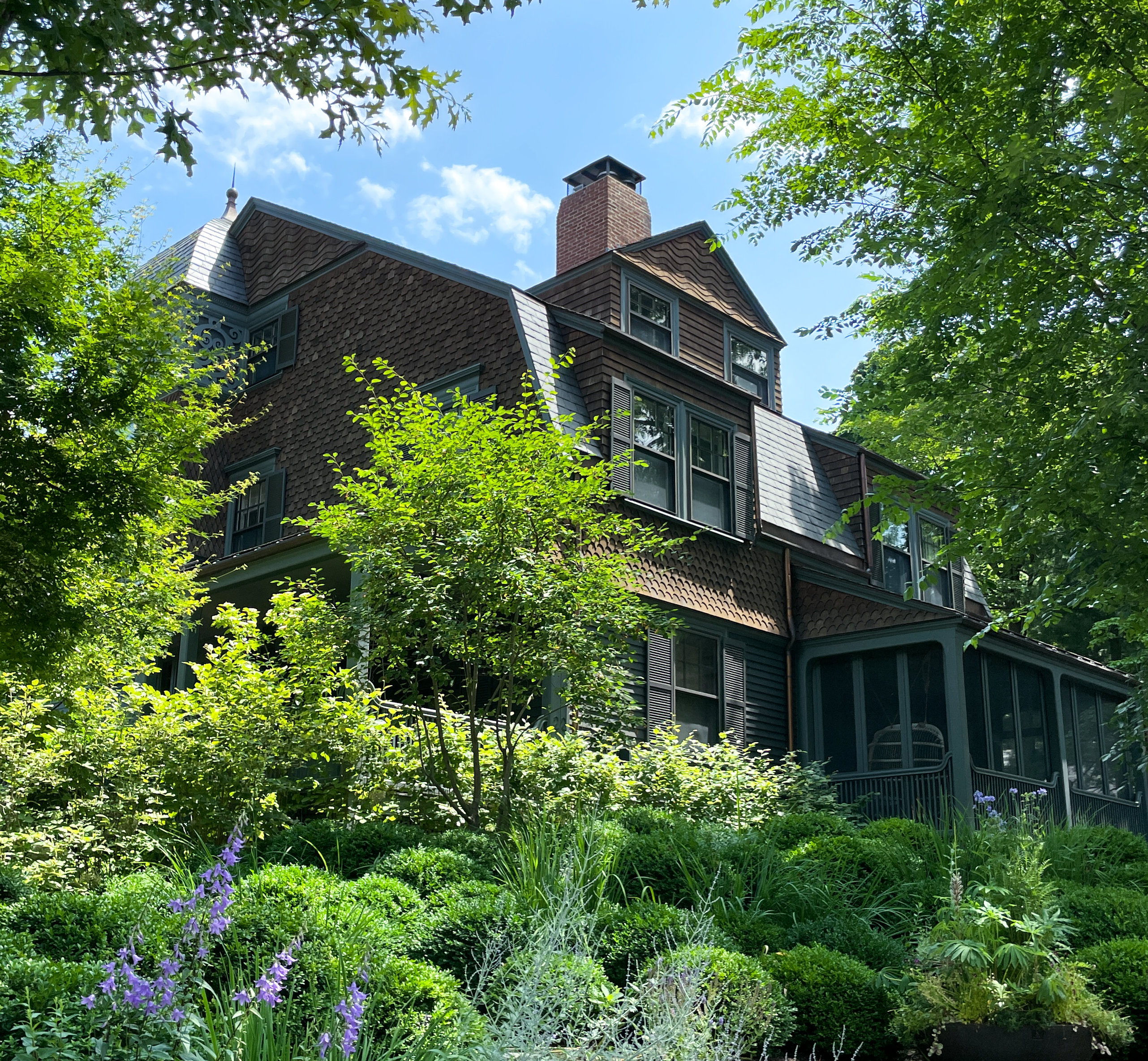
22 Irving St.

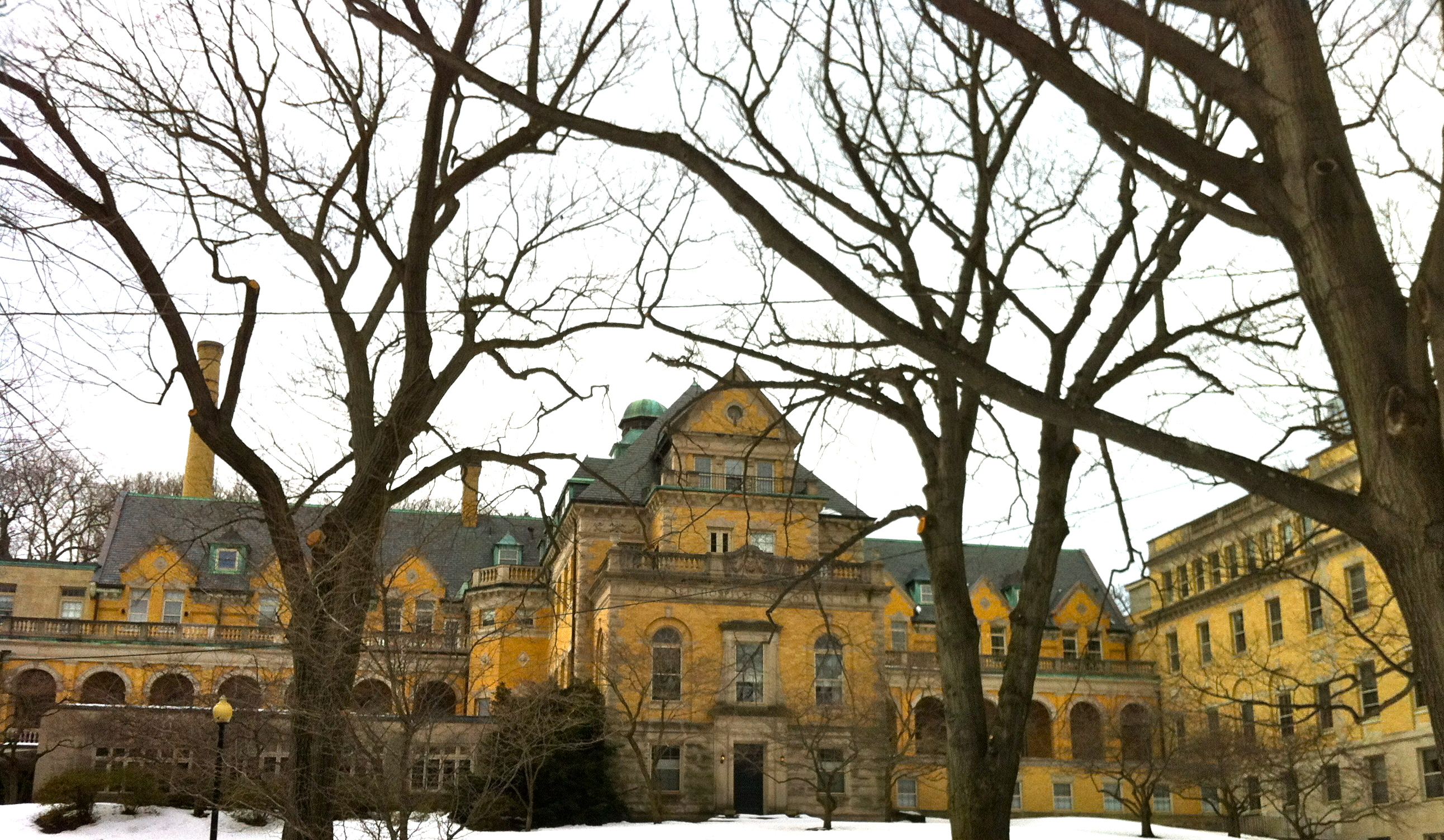
Free Hospital for Women.

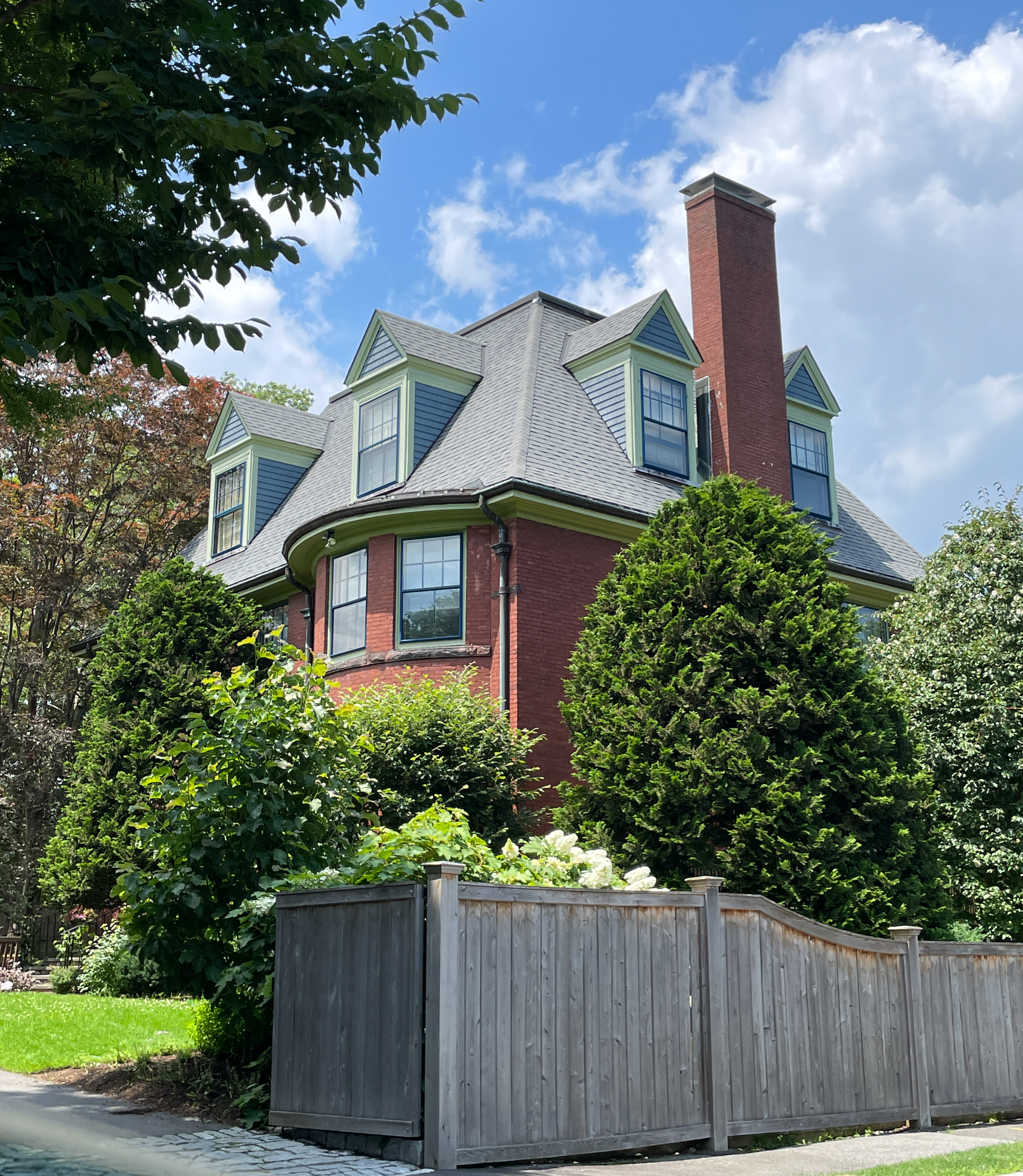
100 Upland Rd.

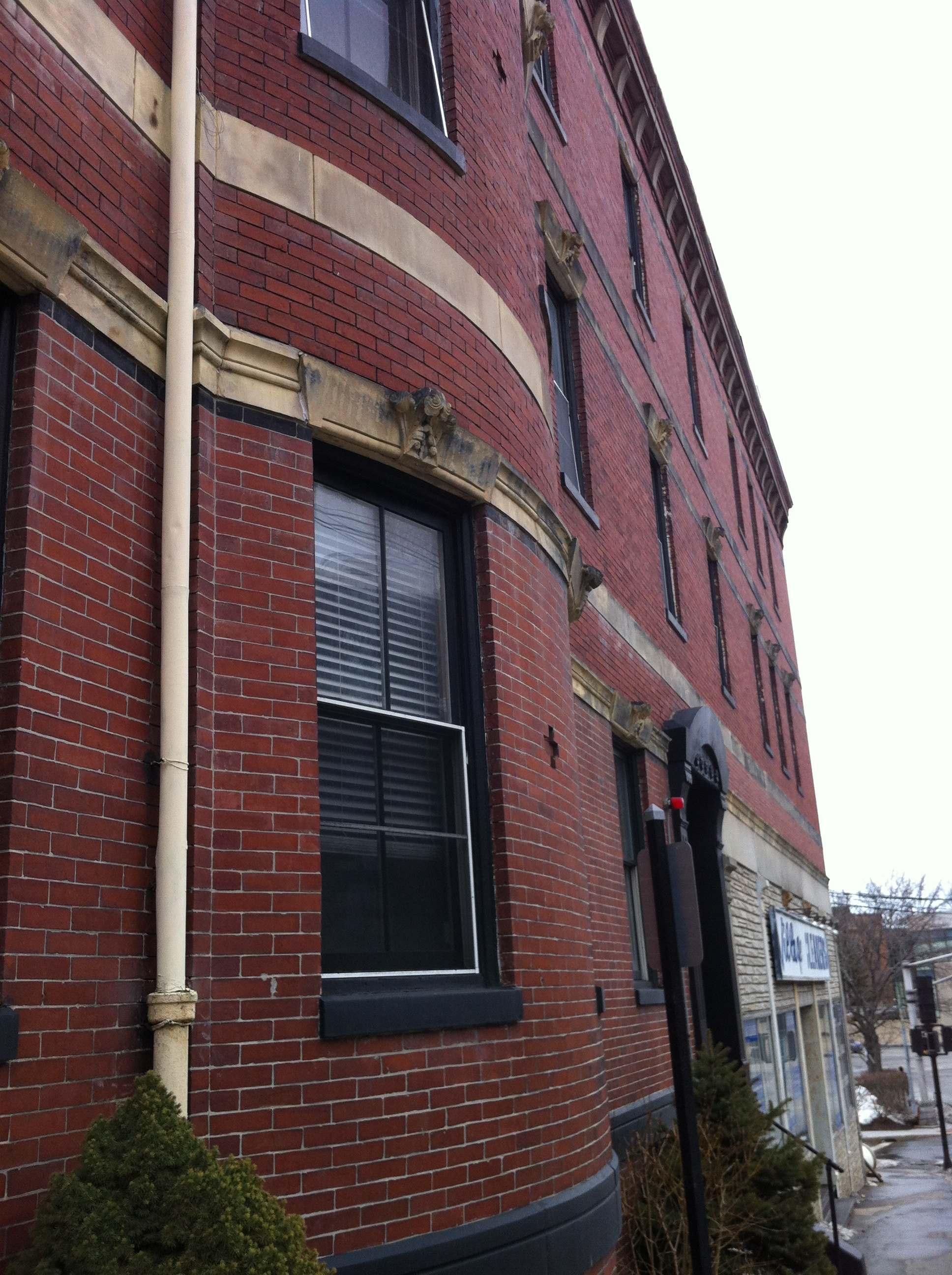
Hotel Adelaide.

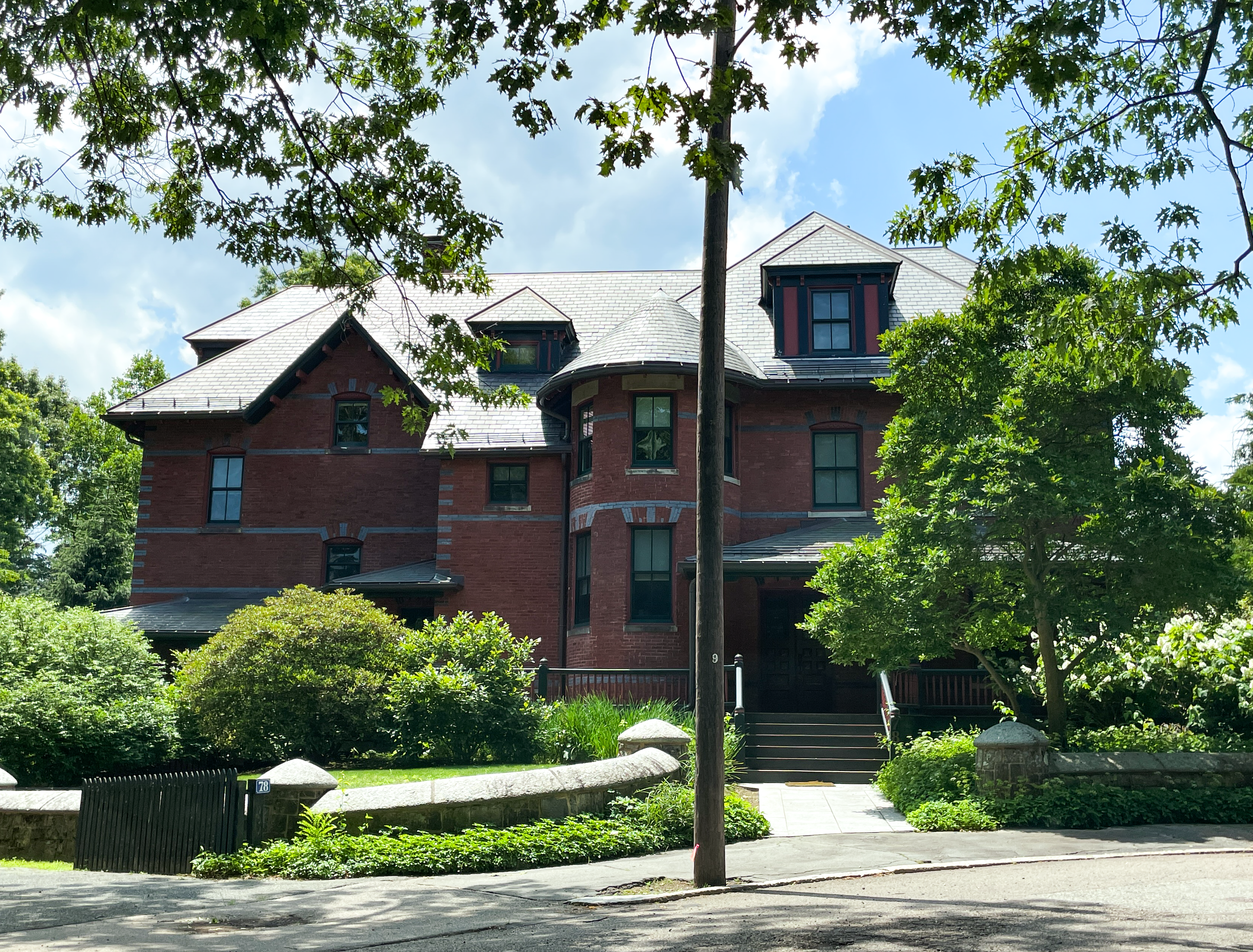
78 Upland Rd.
