= Pill Hill =

Pill Hill is a name for neighborhoods in several cities, usually ones that contain a hospital. It may refer to:

- Pill Hill, Brookline, Massachusetts
- Pill Hill, Atlanta
- Pill Hill, Cincinnati
- Pill Hill, Oakland, California
- Pill Hill, Rochester, Minnesota
- Pill Hill, San Diego, California
- Pill Hill, Chicago
- Marquam Hill, Portland, Oregon, also called Pill Hill
- First Hill, Seattle, colloquially called Pill Hill due to the presence of three major hospitals

It may also refer to

- Pill Hill (play) a play set in Pill Hill, Chicago
