= Samuel Kelly =

Samuel Kelly may refer to:

- Samuel Kelly (coal merchant) (1818–1877), Irish businessman, unionist gun-runner, shipowner and coal merchant
- Sir Samuel Kelly (1879–1937), his grandson, Irish coal merchant, philanthropist and businessman
- Samuel E. Kelly (1926–2009), American academic

== See also ==
- Sam Kelly (disambiguation)
- Sam Kelley, American playwright
