= Enrico Braggiotti =

Turkish-born Monegasque banker (1923–2019)

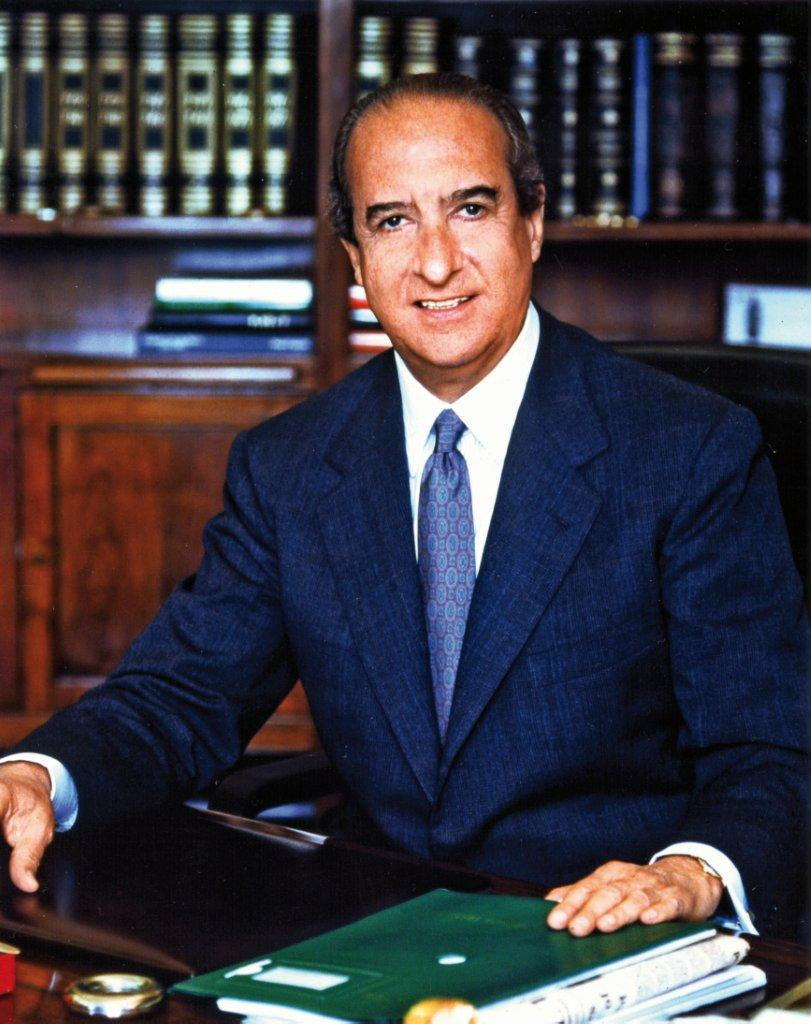
- Enrico Braggiotti

President of the Banca Commerciale Italiana
- In office 1988–1990

Personal details
- Born: 27 January 1923 Turkey
- Died: 31 October 2019 (aged 96)
- Profession: Banker

Enrico Braggiotti (27 January 1923 – 31 October 2019) was a Turkish-born Monegasque banker.

== Biography ==
Braggiotti was born in Turkey from a Catholic italian family. His father Etienne, was the former head of the Ottoman Bank, and his mother, Renata Solari, was Italian too. He was married to Magda de Portu who was born in Paris. He was the father of four children: Jean-Luc, Gérard, Sandra and Silvana.

Braggiotti left Turkey a few weeks after he was born, and moved with his parents and his sister to the Principality of Monaco, where his grandfather Henri and his grandmother Appolonie Trullet, the child of a famous family of sailors from Saint-Tropez (her grandfather was Jean-François-Timothée Trullet, commander of the Guerrier, French battleship involved in the Battle of the Nile).

Braggiotti studied at the Lycée de Monaco, and then was hired by the Banca Commerciale Italiana (Comit) where he worked until his retirement in 1990.

In 1993, he was indicted in the Enimont affair, and was found guilty of receiving bribes from Raul Gardini.

== Career ==
His career at the bank started in 1950 in Casablanca, 1955 in Italy, and 1960 at the Central Division in Milan.

In 1965, he became a member of the Central Division Committee, Vice-Executive in 1984, and President in 1988.

During the 1980s, the Italian banking system went through deep structural transformations to become international, a process through which most nationalized banks became privately held, including the famous Mediobanca. The Banca Commerciale Italiana led the way to this national transformation, in which Braggiotti played an important role through his position and responsibilities.

In 1990, Braggiotti left the head of the Banca Commerciale Italiana and returned to his homeland: Monaco. He became a full-fledged Monegasque in 1992.

Braggiotti becomes the CEO of the Compagnie Monégasque de Banque, succeeding to Pierre-Paul Schweitzer, and got involved in the capital with a group of Monegasques, including Jean-Charles Rey's family.

As board members, he gathered a round of high-profile French personalities: Raymond Barre, Antoine Bernheim, Jean-François Poncet, Raoul Biancheri, Henry Rey. Braggiotti was also appointed as administrator for the Société des Bains de Mer in 1988.

In 2004, the Compagnie Monégasque de Banque's stockholders decided to sell their Mediobanca shares. In 2006, Braggiotti left the CMB.

== The Monaco Méditerranée Foundation ==
He established the Monaco Méditerranée Foundation (MMF) which organizes, under the supervision of the Prince Albert II, periodic conferences with distinguished personalities from France and Italy.

The Monaco Méditérranée Foundation became the dynamo of Monaco's cultural life. Among other things, the Principality of Monaco enrolled the MMF in the management of the Anna Lindh Foundation, a Foundation where Enrico Braggiotti is an active member since the Principality joined the Union for the Méditerranée.

== Boards ==
During his career, Braggiotti has been board member of Lehman Brothers in New York City, of BNP Paribas (Paris), of Sudameris Bank (Paris), of Mediobanca (Milan), of the Ciments Français (Paris), of the Société des Bains (Monaco), and President of the Compagnie Monégasque de Banque (Monaco).

== Titles ==
- Italy : Cavaliere del Lavoro (Italy)
- Italy : Grand cross of the Italian Republic
- France : Officier de la Légion d’Honneur
- Monaco : Grand Officer of the Order of Saint-Charles – Sovereign Ordonnance n° 15566 of 18 November 2002
- Monaco : Commander of the Order of Grimaldi – Sovereign Ordonnance n° 14273 of 18 November 1999
- Monaco : Officer of the Order of Cultural Merit (Monaco) – Sovereign Ordonnance n° 16513 of 18 November 2004
