= Bronzeville Children's Museum =

African American Children's museum in Chicago, IL

- Motto: Building Children's Minds

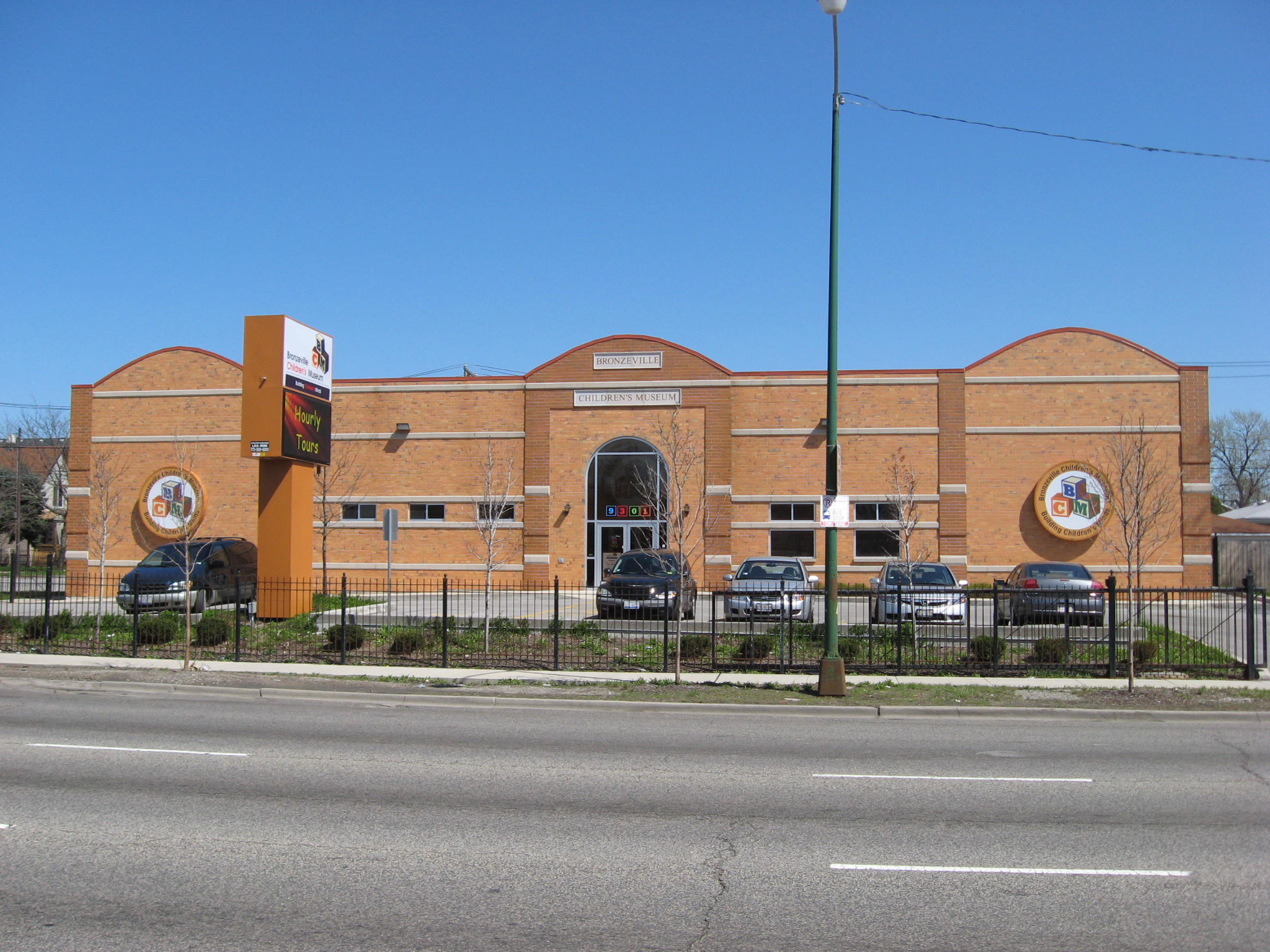
- Bronzeville Children's Museum in the Calumet Heights community area of the South Side of Chicago

- Location within the Chicago metropolitan area.
- Established: 1998 (current location since 2008)
- Location: 9301 South Stony Island Avenue; Chicago, IL 60617 (August 19, 2008–present) 9500 South Western Avenue; Evergreen Park, IL 60805 (1998–2008)
- Coordinates: 41.725419°N 87.584904°W
- Type: African American Children's museum
- President: Peggy Montes
- Public transit access: Chicago Transit Authority 28, X28, 95E buslines
- Website: www.bronzevillechildrensmuseum.com

Bronzeville Children's Museum is a museum in the Calumet Heights community area of the South Side of Chicago. It is the first and only African American children's museum in the United States. Founded in 1998, the museum moved to its current location at 9301 South Stony Island Avenue in the Pill Hill neighborhood in 2008.

== History ==
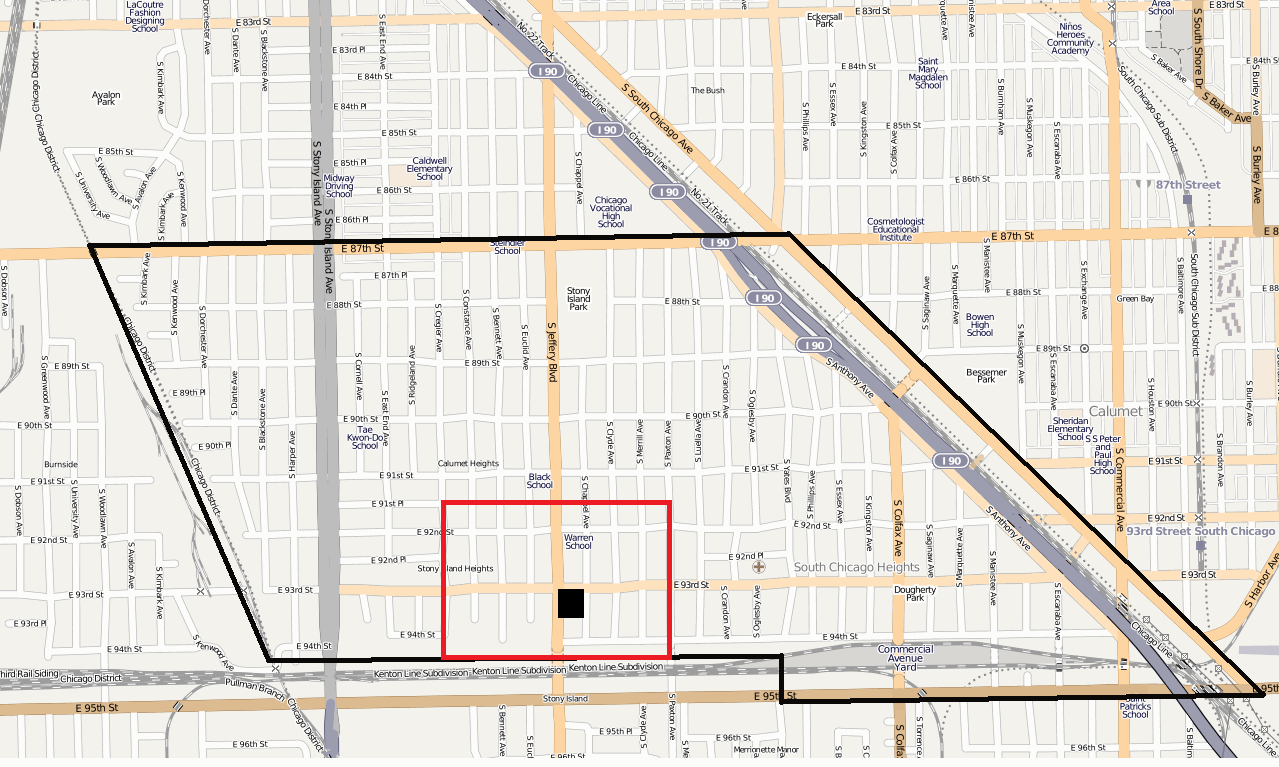
Bronzeville Children's Museum (black dot) inside Pill Hill neighborhood (red border) and Calumet Heights (black border)

In 1998, Peggy Montes founded the museum in Evergreen Park, Illinois at 97th and Western Avenue. A retired Chicago Public Schools teacher, she was motivated to start the museum after attending a museum convention where she visited numerous children's museums. It was formerly located in the Evergreen Plaza on the lower level in a 1,275-square-foot (118.5 m^{2}) space. The relocated museum opened on August 19, 2000, in a space ten times larger and with three times as more exhibits than the prior home. Construction of the new museum location was sponsored by Commonwealth Edison. Jewel-Osco became a sponsor of the museum in 2000.

== Mission ==
The Museum is designed to serve children between the age of 3 and 9. The museum is located away from the Bronzeville, Chicago neighborhood bounded by 26th Street and 51st Street on the north and south, respectively, and Wentworth Avenue and Cottage Grove Avenue. Nonetheless, the museum was named after the neighborhood, which is the neighborhood where African Americans settled in large concentration in Chicago. Although over 100 children's museums serve the youth of America, this is the only one that focuses on African American culture and history.
