= Hotel Adelaide =

- U.S. National Register of Historic Places
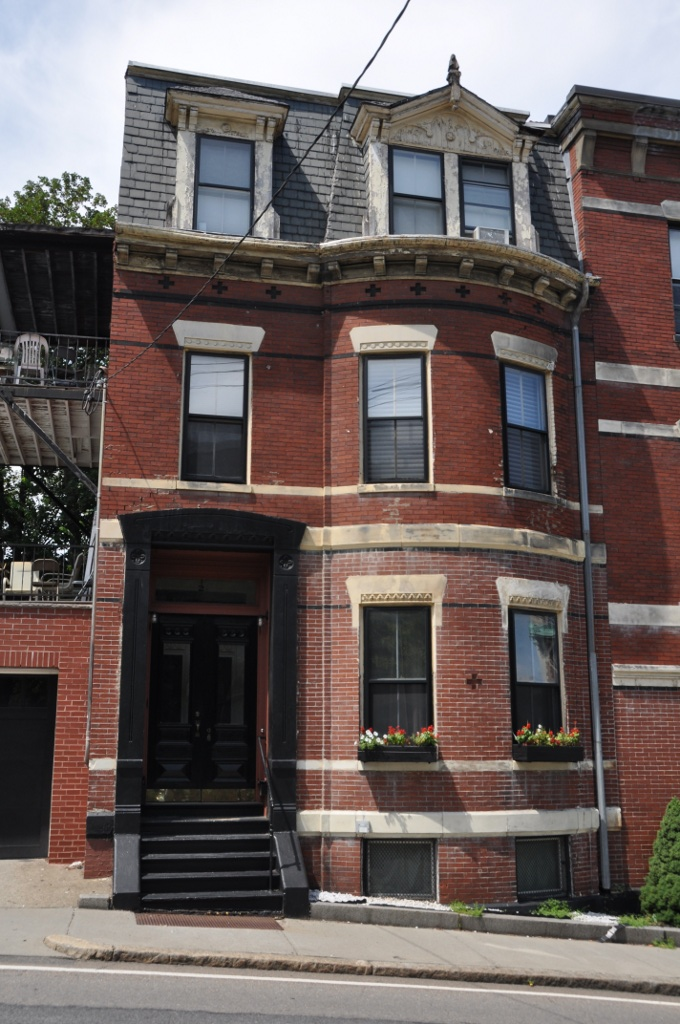

- Location within Massachusetts Location within the United States
- Location: 13–21 High St., Brookline, Massachusetts
- Coordinates: 42°19′51″N 71°7′6″W
- Built: 1875
- Architect: Obed F. Smith
- Architectural style: Gothic
- MPS: Brookline MRA
- NRHP reference No.: 85003276
- Added to NRHP: October 17, 1985

The Hotel Adelaide is a historic apartment house at 13–21 High Street in the Pill Hill neighborhood of Brookline, Massachusetts, United States. Built in 1875, it is one of the earliest known examples of a duplex-style apartment house, in which the individual units occupy space on two floors, connected by a private staircase. The building and added to the National Register of Historic Places in 1985.

== Description and history ==
The Hotel Adelaide is set at the southwest corner of High and Walnut Streets, at the base of Pill Hill, a neighborhood of fashionable Queen Anne houses. It is a long three story brick structure, with sandstone trim. Notable exterior features include beltcourses of stone between the floors, and narrower stringcourses of stone at the base of the windows, with decorative stone hoods over the windows. A portion of the building at the southern end has a curved bay section and separate entrance, and is topped by a mansard roof; the function of this part of the hotel is unknown, but was an original feature.

The building was built in 1875 by Eben Wright, a real estate investor from Nahant, who owned this property and the nearby Hotel Kempsford. The building was designed by Brookline architect Obed Smith, who described as innovative the internal layout of the units, with two floors separated by a private staircase, in an 1884 publication. The style would later be emulated in other Brookline apartment houses including the Building at 30–34 Station Street.

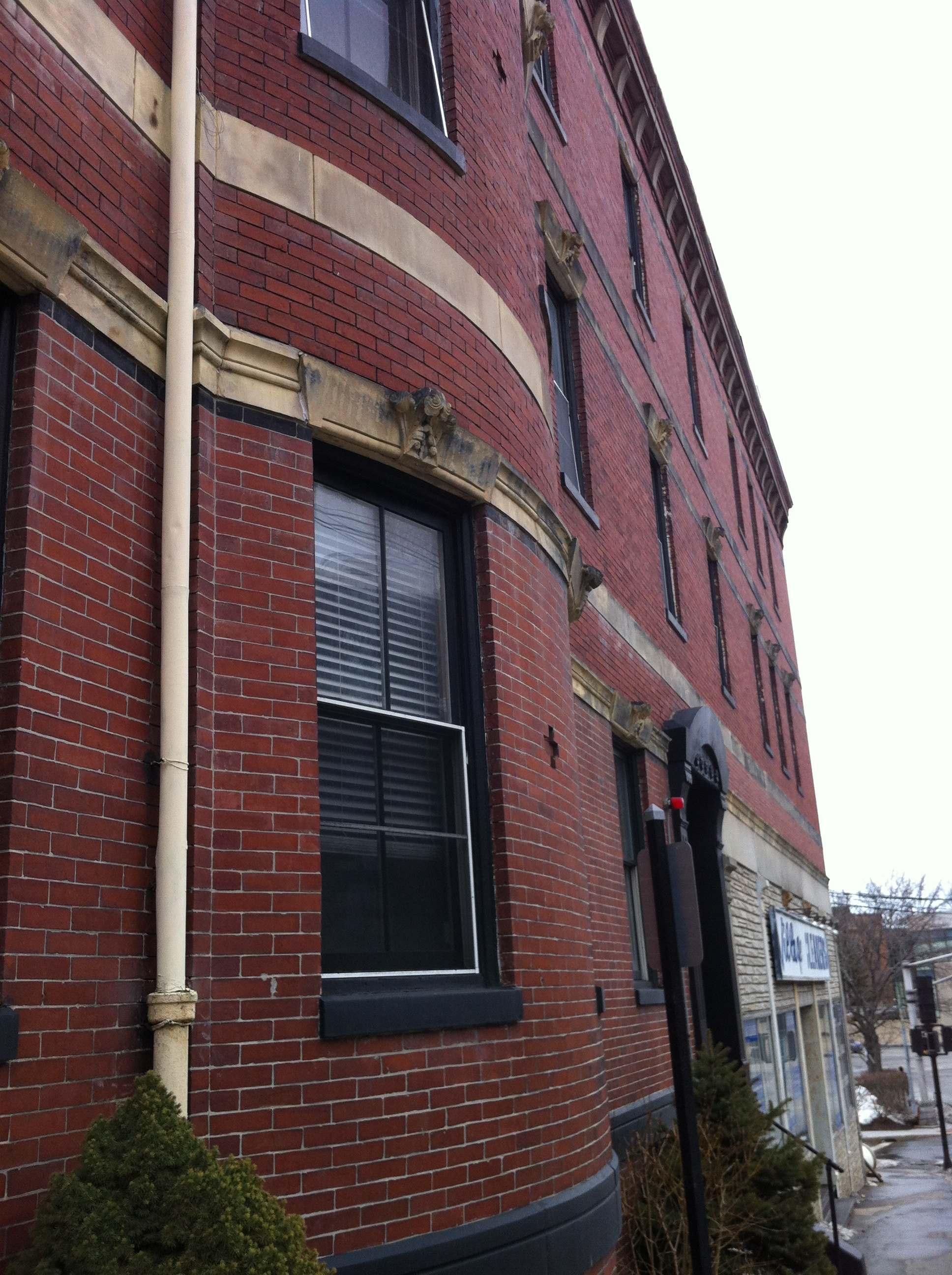
Hotel Adelaide

== See also ==
- National Register of Historic Places listings in Brookline, Massachusetts
