= Pill Hill, Chicago =

Neighborhood in Calumet Heights, Chicago

Coordinates: 41°43′34″N 87°34′32″W

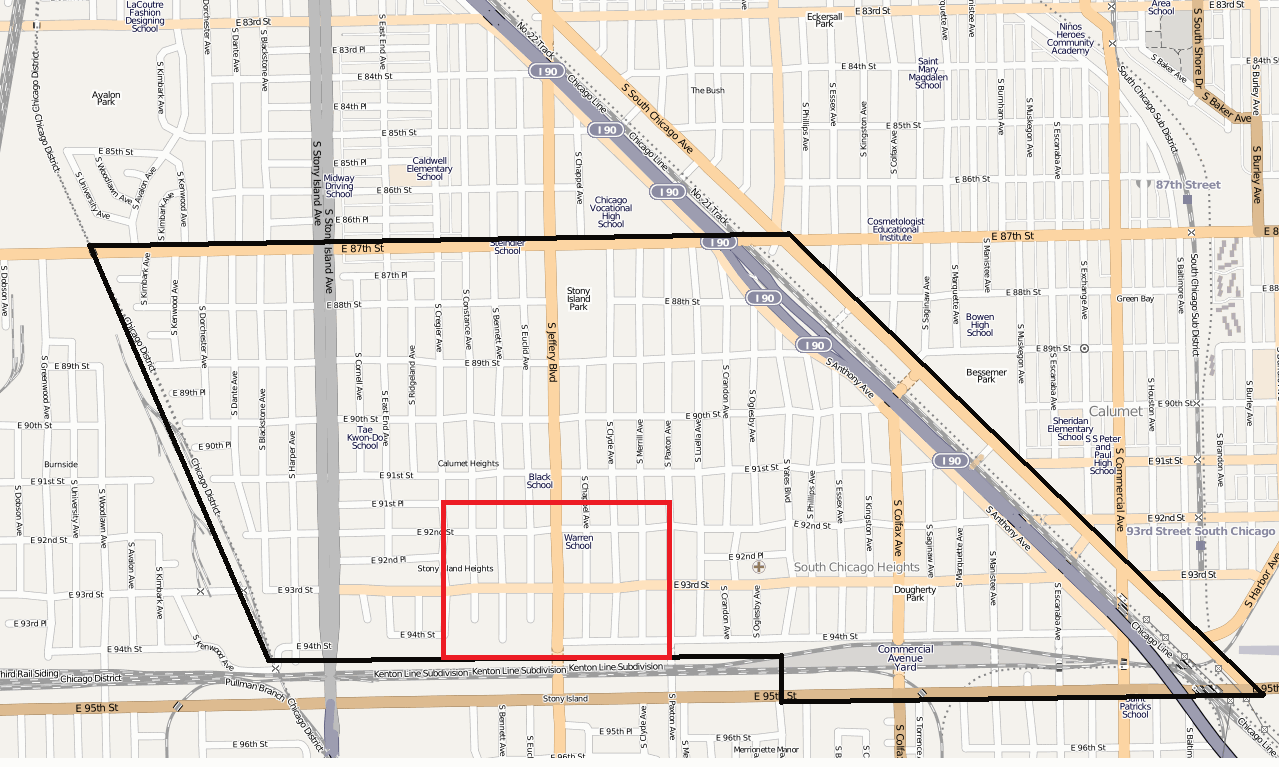
Pill Hill (red) within the Calumet Heights community area

Pill Hill is a neighborhood in the Calumet Heights community area on the South Side of Chicago, Illinois, United States. Its name refers to the many doctors who used to live in the neighborhood.

== Geography ==
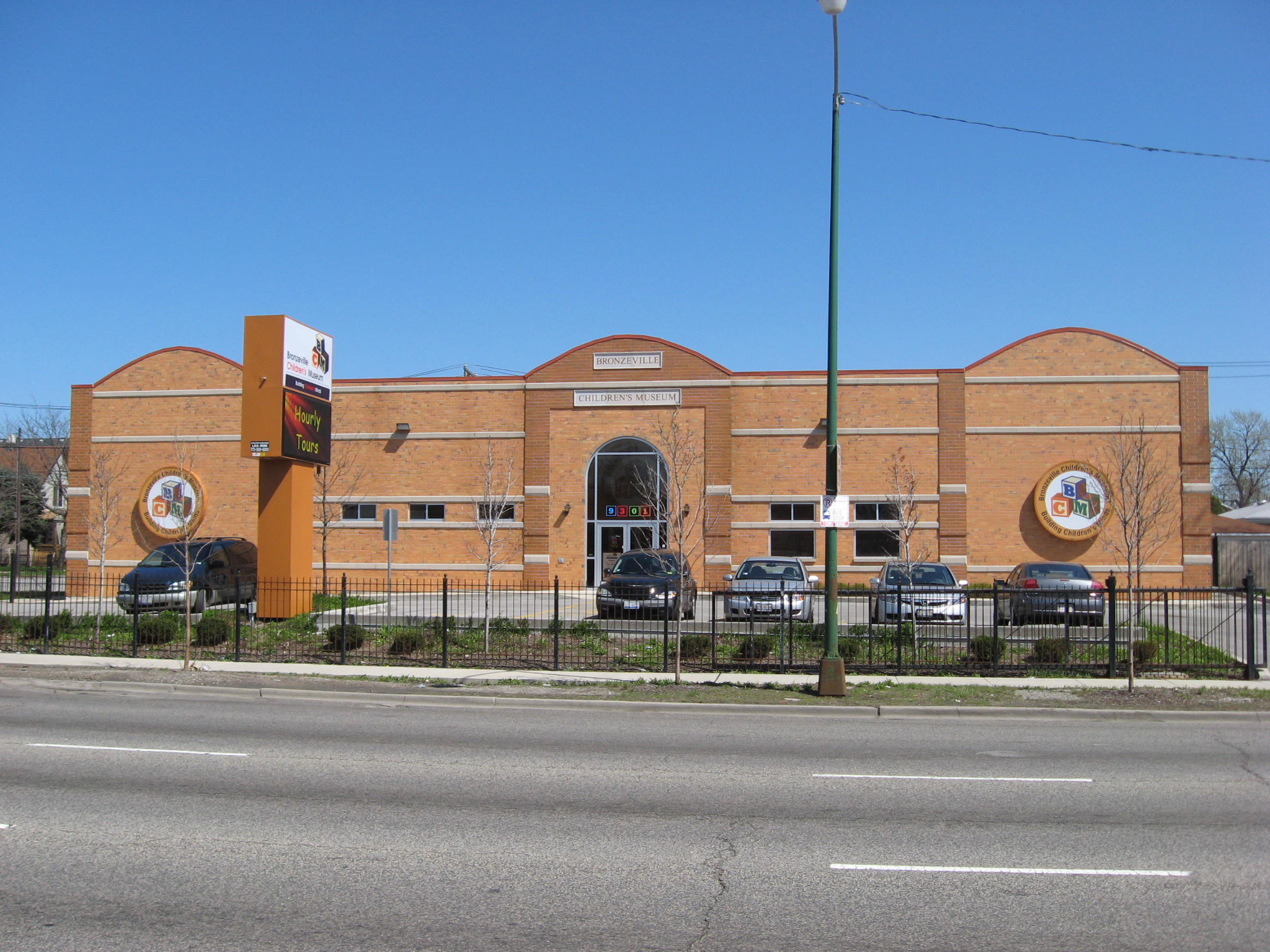
The Bronzeville Children's Museum is located at 9301 South Stony Island Avenue.

According to The Electronic Encyclopedia of Chicago, the neighborhood is the more affluent portion of the Stony Island Heights neighborhood that occupies the eastern two-thirds of Calumet Heights. Several sources more loosely define Pill Hill as the entire Calumet Heights region and use the names interchangeably to refer to the whole area. Other sources including one co-published by MSNBC, clearly depict it as a rectangular neighborhood running for eight blocks bounded by East 91st or East 92nd Street and East 94th or East 95th Street to the north and south, respectively, and South Paxton Avenue and South Cregier Avenue to the east and west, respectively. The neighborhood is known for homes with built-in one-car garages and private yards. The region has little commercial development.

== History ==
The neighborhood was first settled by farmers who quickly became disappointed in the region's swampy nature. After the area was developed by nearby factory workers in the 1870s, it was incorporated into the city of Chicago in 1889 along with the Hyde Park Township. In the 1940s, the factory workers were replaced by white collar residents. By the 1970s, the neighborhood had earned a reputation for affluence and quality residences. The neighborhood soon became a favorite residence of African American doctors from the nearby South Chicago Community Hospital. In a community area of above average wealth compared to the Chicago statistical averages, Pill Hill has above-average affluence compared to the rest of the community area according to the Encyclopedia. The moniker is attributed to the preponderance of doctors employed at the nearby South Chicago Community Hospital who reside in the grand homes situated atop the Stony Island ridge. However, the neighborhood no longer hosts such a high concentration of doctors and is a varied middle-class neighborhood. The racial transformation has been documented in the 1998 book entitled The South Side: The Racial Transformation of an American Neighborhood. A play by Yale School of Drama graduate Sam Kelley entitled Pill Hill was set in this neighborhood. It debuted at the Yale Repertory Theatre has been produced in many venues in recent decades. Pill Hill is credited by one Chicago Sun-Times author as one of the few communities to host civil rights activists such as Martin Luther King Jr. and Jesse Jackson during the 1960s.
