= Sam Kelly (disambiguation) =

Sam Kelly (1943-2014) was a British actor from Allo 'Allo! and On The Up.

Sam Kelly is the name of:

- Sam Kelly (musician), British singer on Britain's Got Talent
- Samantha Kelly (born 1997), Northern Irish footballer
- Samantha Kelly (character), character from The Bold and the Beautiful
- Sam Kelly (footballer) (born 1993), English professional footballer

== See also ==
- Sam Kelley (born 1946), professor at the State University of New York College at Cortland
