= Eliphalet Spurr House =

Historic house in Massachusetts, United States

- U.S. National Register of Historic Places
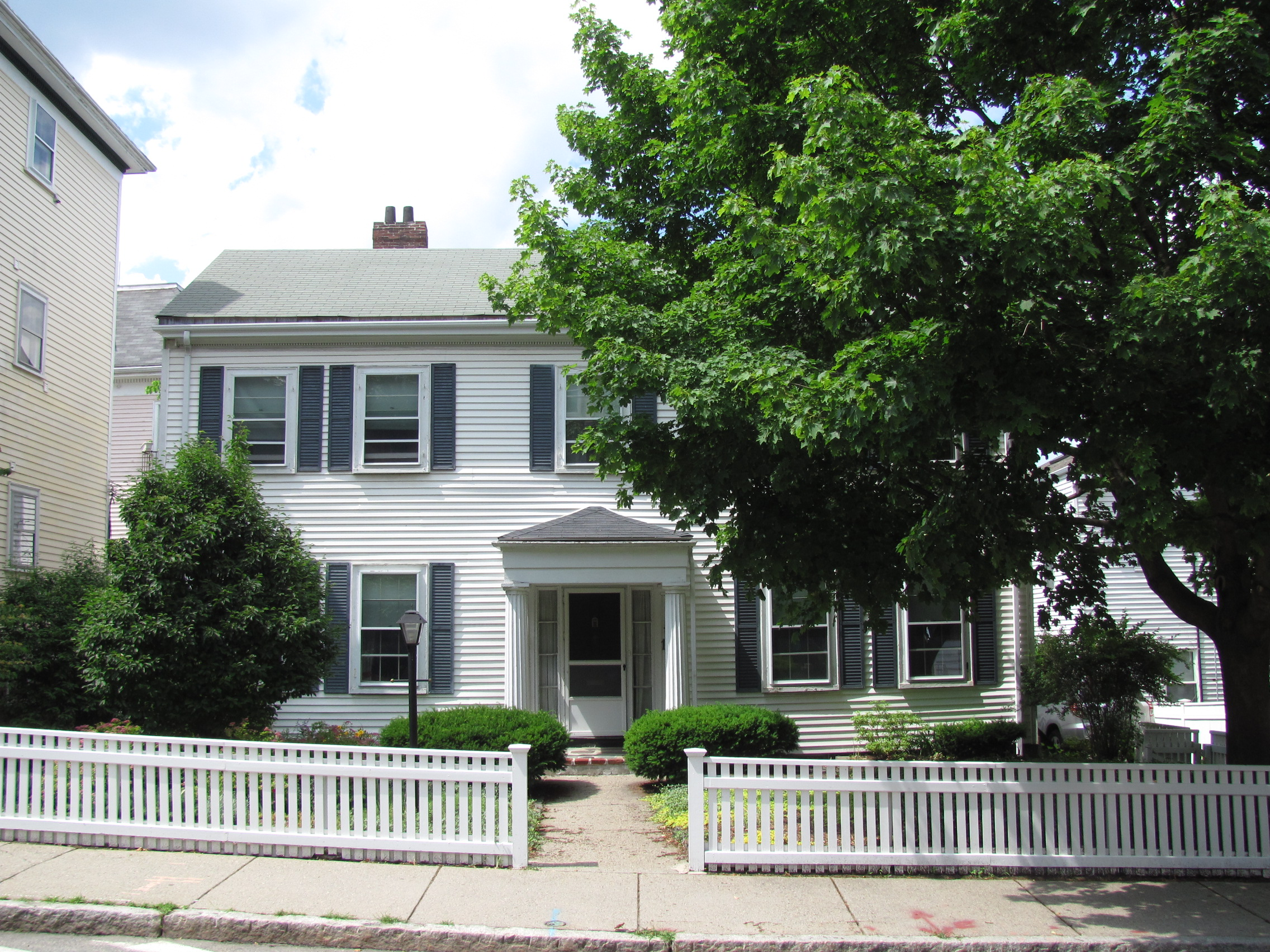
- Eliphalet Spurr House

- Location within Massachusetts Location within the United States
- Location: 103 Walnut St., Brookline, Massachusetts
- Coordinates: 42°19′52″N 71°7′9″W
- Built: 1798
- Architectural style: Georgian
- MPS: Brookline MRA
- NRHP reference No.: 85003316
- Added to NRHP: October 17, 1985

The Eliphalet Spurr House is a historic house located at 103 Walnut Street in Brookline, Massachusetts, United States.

== Description and history ==
The 2 1/2-story wood-frame house was built in 1798 by Eliphalet Spurr, who was locally prominent as one of the first operators of a local coach service, providing transport to Boston (which then required a roundabout trip via Roxbury and the Boston Neck). It is the oldest building in the Pill Hill, and one of the town's few 18th century Georgian houses.

The house was listed on the National Register of Historic Places on October 17, 1985.

== See also ==
- National Register of Historic Places listings in Brookline, Massachusetts
