= Hotel Kempsford =

- U.S. National Register of Historic Places
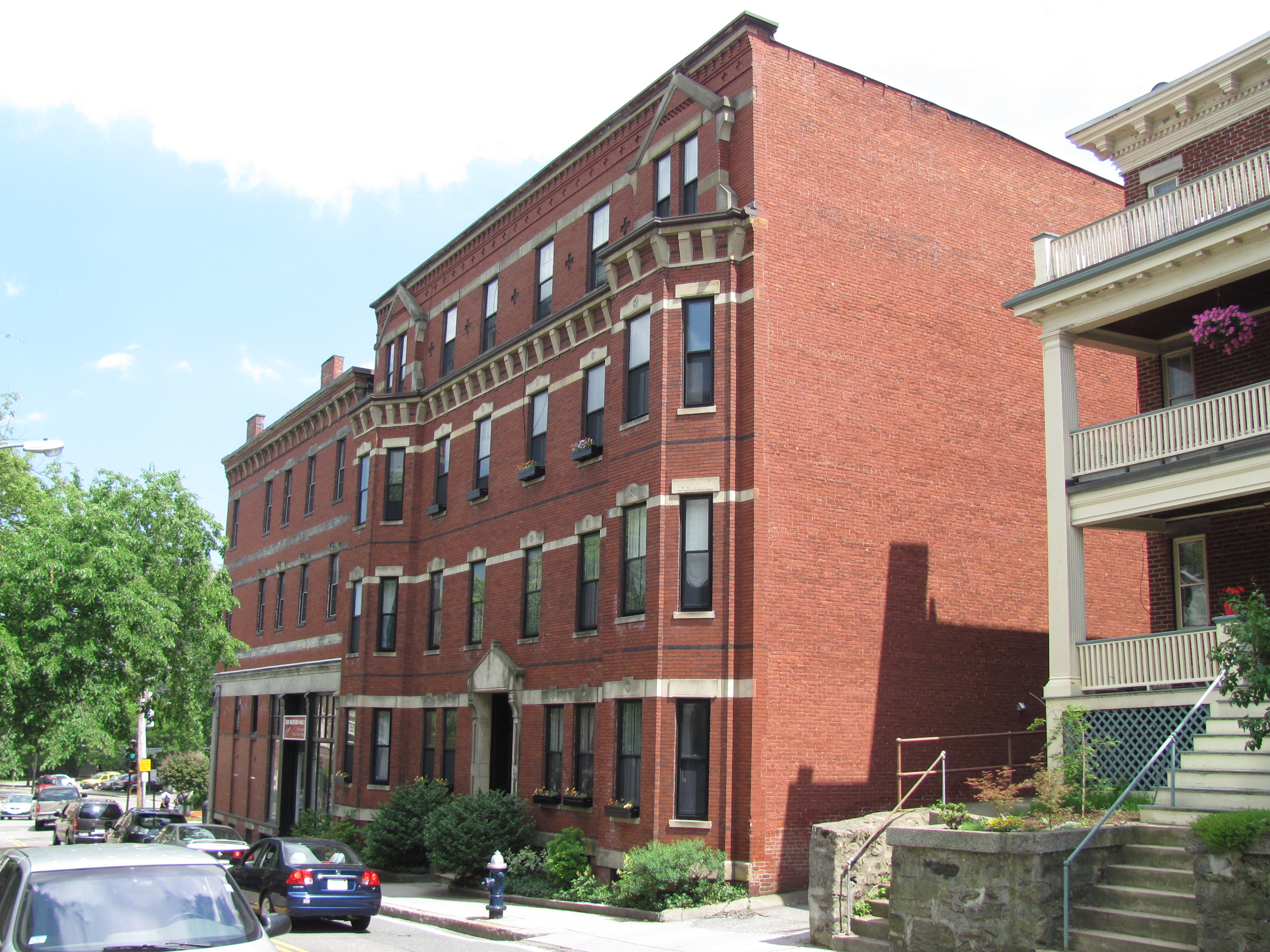
- Hotel Kempsford

- Location within Massachusetts Location within the United States
- Location: 72 Walnut St., Brookline, Massachusetts
- Coordinates: 42°19′50″N 71°7′8″W
- Built: 1875
- Architect: Smith, O.; Wright, E.
- Architectural style: Gothic
- MPS: Brookline MRA
- NRHP reference No.: 85003277
- Added to NRHP: October 17, 1985

The Hotel Kempsford is a historic apartment house at 72 Walnut Street in Brookline, Massachusetts. The four story brick building was designed by Brookline architect Obed Smith and built in 1875 for Eben Wright, a real estate developer who also built the nearby Hotel Adelaide. This building is a high-quality local example of Victorian Gothic architecture in brick. The apartment units inside are also in a distinctive two-story plan, one of the earliest examples of the type.

The building was listed on the National Register of Historic Places in 1985.

== See also ==
- National Register of Historic Places listings in Brookline, Massachusetts
