= Gerardo Braggiotti =

Italian banker

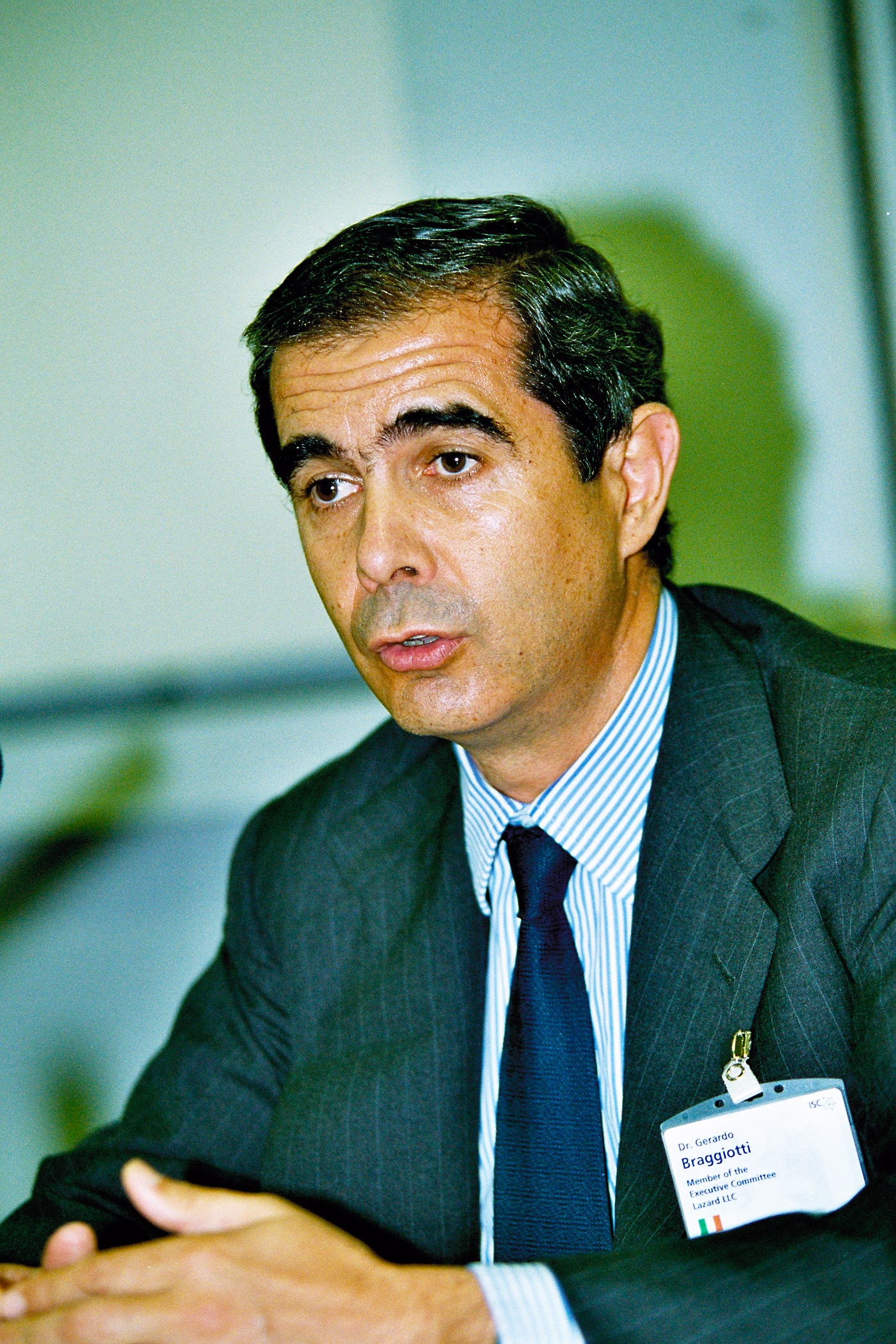
- Braggiotti in 2001
- Born: c. 1953
- Education: Sciences Po (Paris, France), University of Milan (PhD in Law)
- Occupation: Banker
- Known for: Former Deputy Chairman of Lazard, Chief Executive Officer of Gruppo Banca Leonardo
- Children: 2 daughters

Gerardo Braggiotti (born c. 1953) is an Italian banker. A former Deputy Chairman of Lazard, he is the chief executive officer of Gruppo Banca Leonardo.

== Biography ==
Born into a Levantine banking family, he is the son of Enrico Braggiotti, president of Banca Commerciale Italiana, and Magda de Portu, born in Paris, also of Levantine descent. He has three siblings, Gianluca, Sandra and Silvana. His grandfather Stefano Braggiotti was a director of the Ottoman Bank.

After studying at the French high schools Lycée français Chateaubriand in Rome and Stendhal in Milan, he graduated with honors from Sciences Po in Paris. He received a Doctor of Philosophy in law from the University of Milan and is a Tax advisor with the Institute of Chartered Accountants in England and Wales (ICAEW). He began his career in 1974 at General Electric in Milan, then moved to Arthur Andersen, first in London, then in Milan. In Mediobanca since 1980 for which he worked for more than fifteen years as General Secretary and then Central Director. Considered the natural heir of Enrico Cuccia he left the bank due to a clash with CEO Vincenzo Maranghi. From 1998 to 2005 at the top of the French-American merchant bank Lazard. During that period Braggiotti was at the same time a consultant to the Turin-based Sanpaolo IMI and to UniCredit, at the time of the double takeover bid on Banca di Roma and Comit. In 2001, he is at the center of two important transactions that will mark the years to come: the takeover bid by Fiat and EDF on Montedison and the takeover of TIM Group by Marco Tronchetti Provera Pirelli. He is a member of Inter's board of directors under Erick Thohir presidency from 2013 to 2016.

Since 2019, he has been country advisor to Goldman Sachs bank.

== Early life ==
Gerardo Braggiotti was born circa 1953, to Enrico Braggiotti, born in Turkey to an ancient Venetian family that had moved to the Ottoman Empire, and Magda Ester de Portu, born in Paris to a Levantine family of Sephardic origin. He graduated from Sciences Po in Paris, France. He received a PhD in law from the University of Milan. He is an Associate of the Institute of Chartered Accountants in England and Wales.

== Career ==
Braggiotti began his career at General Electric, an American energy corporation, in Milan, Italy. He then worked for Arthur Andersen, an American accounting firm, in London for four years. Later, he worked at Mediobanca, an Italian investment bank, for fifteen years. He joined Lazard in 1998, and was its deputy chairman until 2005.

Since 2006, he has been the chief executive officer of Gruppo Banca Leonardo. In 2015, he sold Banca Leonardo to the US investment firm Houlihan Lokey, who in turn sold it to Crédit Agricole in 2017. In 2017, he launched the equity fund Sprint Italy.

In February 2019, he became Goldman Sachs' country advisor for Italy.

== Personal life ==
He is married and has two daughters.
