= Mario Braggiotti =

American pianist (1905–1996)

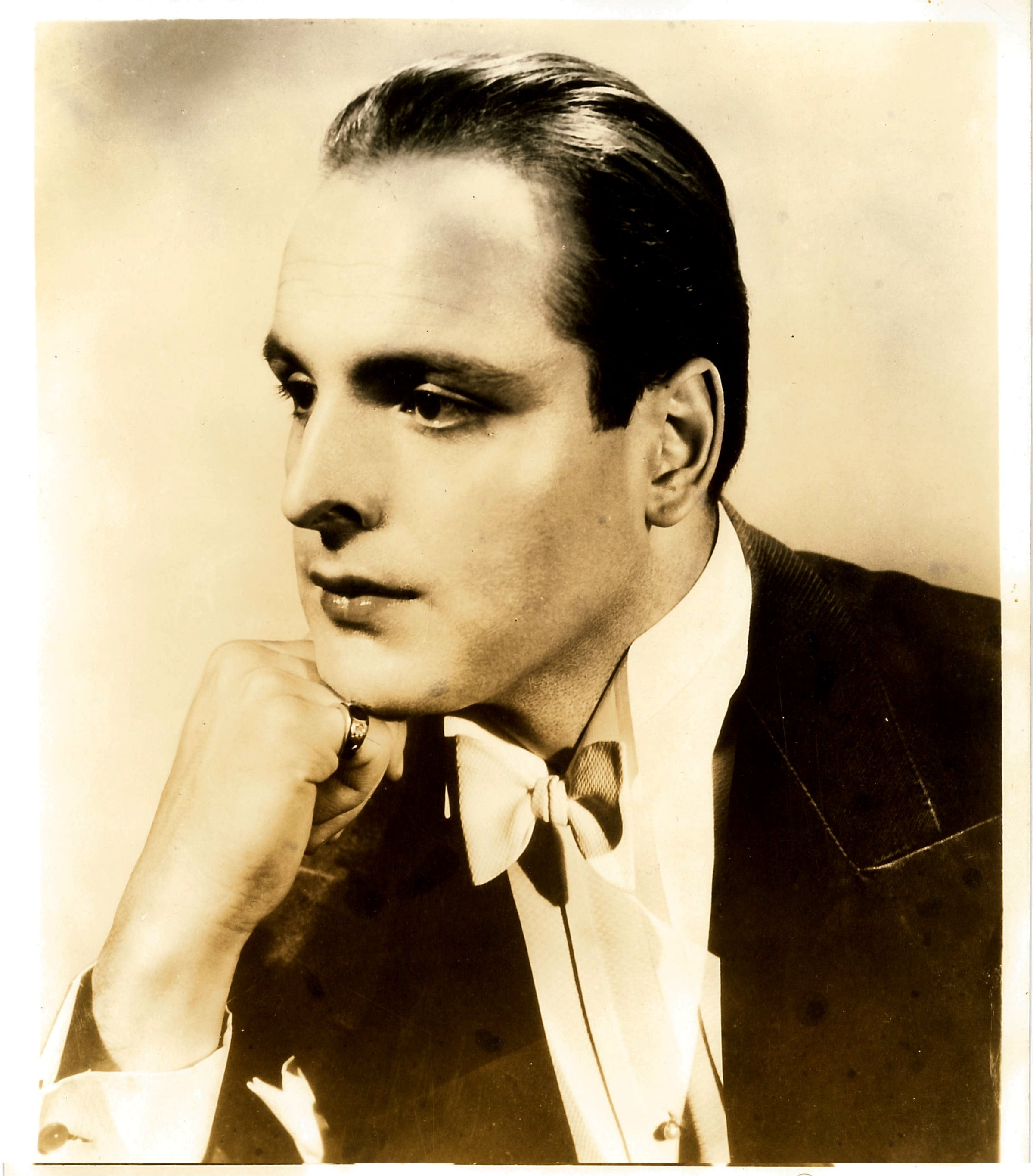
- Born: November 29, 1905; Florence, Italy
- Died: May 18, 1996 (aged 90); West Palm Beach, Florida, U.S.
- Education: New England Conservatory; Conservatoire de Paris
- Occupations: Composer, pianist, raconteur
- Relatives: Gloria Braggiotti (sister); John Davis Lodge (brother-in-law); Emlen Etting (brother-in-law)

Mario Braggiotti (November 29, 1905 – May 18, 1996) was a United States pianist, composer and raconteur. His career was launched by George Gershwin, who became his friend and mentor.

== Early history ==
Braggiotti was born in Florence, Italy; his father was an Italian tenor, Isidore Braggiotti, born in Paris; his mother was an American mezzo-soprano from Boston. His musical abilities were evident early. As a child, nicknamed "Tunti," he would return from attending an opera, sit at the piano, and recreate by ear the arias he had just heard performed. He was the fourth of eight children. One sister, Francesca, became the wife of Ambassador John Davis Lodge, another sister, Gloria, married artist Emlen Etting and was for decades a leading socialite in Philadelphia as well as a published author. (see Gloria Braggiotti Etting)

After Mario's mother died in 1919, the Braggiotti family returned to Boston. Mario attended The New England Conservatory in Boston then at 17 entered the Paris Conservatoire and the summer Fontainebleau Music School outside Paris. He studied piano with Alfred Cortot and Isidor Philipp and composition with Nadia Boulanger.

== Friendship with George Gershwin ==
While in Paris, Braggiotti teamed up with pianist Jacques Fray to become the duo piano team, Fray and Braggiotti. Mario arranged all the music for the fledgling duo to perform, and they began playing at the Left Bank club "Boeuf sur le Toit". When George Gershwin came to Paris to compose An American in Paris, the young men introduced themselves to their idol, who immediately put them to work trying out the famous taxi horns he was writing into that composition. In 1928 Gershwin helped launch their careers by hiring them to play in his London production of Funny Face with Fred and Adele Astaire.

Mario became a good friend of Gershwin, who once said, "Mario plays my music the way it should be played." Later Braggiotti introduced the Rhapsody in Blue, both with orchestra and in its solo version, in various parts of Europe. The Rhapsody became his signature piece in all his performances.

== Pre-war appearances ==
In 1929 Fray and Braggiotti came to New York, touring and making guest appearances on radio. Braggiotti was the first to combine both classical and popular music on the same program. The team became hugely popular and was billed as "The First Team -- the Last Word." They debuted at Carnegie Hall, played in New York's Town Hall and subsequently were featured on a tour with Maurice Chevalier.

In the 1930s the duo became a household name when hired by William Paley. Fray and Braggiotti performed three nights a week on CBS's nationally broadcast Kraft Music Hall, and Radio City Music Hall. The team toured extensively throughout the US in those years, appearing at the Hollywood Bowl and at the White House, among other notable venues.

In F Scott Fitzgerald's novel Tender is the Night, begun in 1925 and published in 1934, the character of Tommy Bardan is partly based on Braggiotti.

== World War II service ==
When World War II broke out, Braggiotti, an American citizen despite his Italian birth, enlisted in the US Army and was put in the Psychological Warfare Branch of the Office of War Information. As the Allies began their campaign in Casablanca and moved up through the Italian peninsula, Braggiotti took charge of the local and national radio stations and began broadcasting American music and information.

== Post-war career ==
After the war, Braggiotti returned to the US and developed a one-man show that blended comedy and music. He wrote and performed his "Variations on the Theme 'Yankee Doodle'" in the styles of various classical composers, which were published by Schirmer in 1949. Continuing to include both classical and popular music on his programs, he intermingled the piano pieces with humorous anecdotes. He also worked his talent for improvisation into his program by taking three random notes from the audience and creating a composition around them. During this period, he toured throughout Western Europe and South America as well as the US.

In the 1950s Braggiotti wrote his Gettysburg Cantata, based on Lincoln's speech and scored for baritone solo, chorus, and orchestra. It premiered at Carnegie Hall with Izler Solomon conducting and Lawrence Winters as soloist. During this period Braggiotti was chosen by philanthropist Frank Hale to compose a ballet, "The Princess," which debuted in Palm Beach and opened subsequently in London.The ballet was later known as "The Kingdom of Gifts".

In 1963 Braggiotti took over the radio program To France with Music (previously Listening with Jacques Fray) on New York's WQXR after the death of Mr. Fray, its original host.

== Later life and death ==
Braggiotti continued to compose. His body of work over the subsequent years includes a children's musical, Lisa, with Joan Javits, and a musical comedy based on his sister Gloria Braggiotti Etting's family memoir, Born in a Crowd. In 1972 Braggiotti began collaborating with the pianist Susan Snodgrass Andis. Together they wrote the musical I Danced with a Tree and revised Born in a Crowd.

Braggiotti and Andis married and formed a new duo-piano team. He wrote more of his caricatural "Variations on 'Yankee Doodle'", including two vocals for which Susan wrote the lyrics. He did an orchestral reduction of his Gettysburg Cantata using two pianos, percussion, and bass along with the soloist and chorus. With his wife, Braggiotti composed and arranged more music for duo-pianos, and the team performed his works internationally. Together they founded the Braggiotti Music School based in Tuscany. Their collaboration ended with his death on May 18, 1996.

== Honors and awards ==
Among honors bestowed upon Braggiotti were a commendation from the City of Florence for his great Gershwin interpretations, honors from the Sons of Italy, and an induction into the Big Band Hall of Fame in 1995. He was a member of ASCAP.

== Personal life ==
Braggiotti was linked romantically with socialites, actresses, and European noblewomen. His wit, talent, and charm made him popular, and he kept up his friendships in all parts of the world with his voluminous letter-writing. He married three times, first in 1939 to Francise (Baby) Clow of Chicago, then in 1952 to Edwina Feigenspan Osborne of New York. Both of those marriages ended in divorce.

Susan Braggiotti continues her career as a pianist while overseeing their collection of musical scores. She arranged for Braggiotti's works to be housed in the International Piano Archives at the University of Maryland.

Braggiotti was a gourmet cook, often preparing Tuscan specialties at lively dinner parties. He studied Buddhism, believed in reincarnation, and was health-conscious throughout his life. Many of his ideas were decades ahead of their time. His ashes are buried in Florence (Italy) at the Cimitero Evangelico agli Allori.
