= Calumet Heights, Chicago =

Community area in Chicago, Illinois

Calumet Heights
- Community area
- Community Area 48 - Calumet Heights
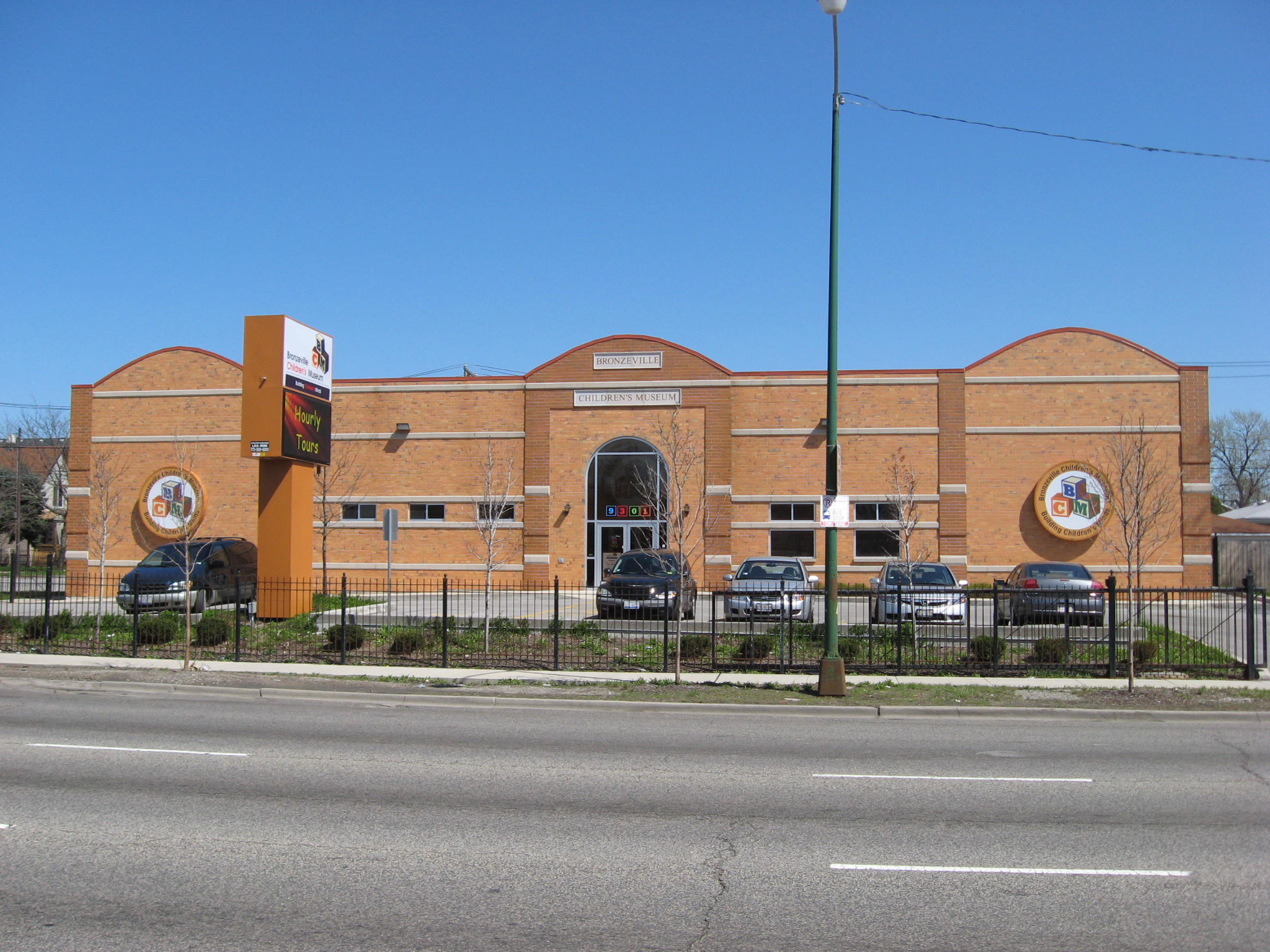
- Bronzeville Children's Museum, the only African-American children's museum in the U.S. is located in Calumet Heights.

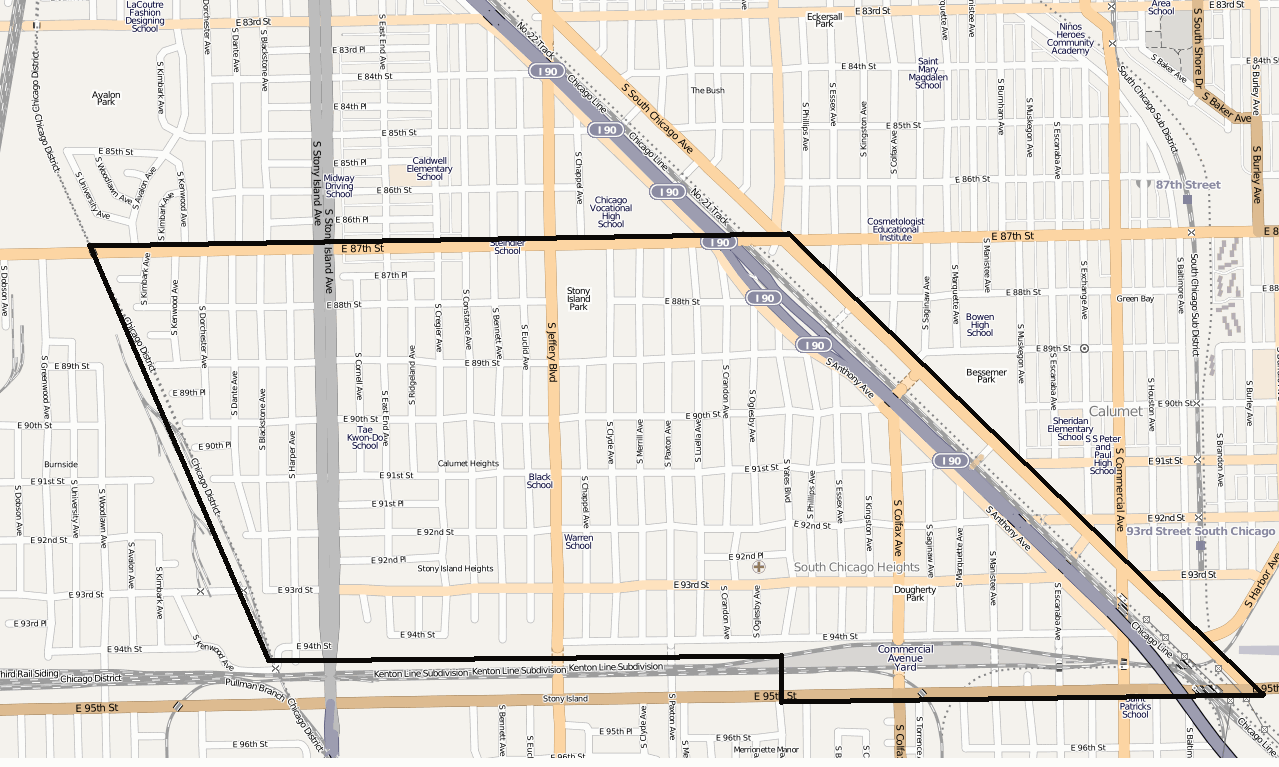

- Location within the city of Chicago
- Coordinates: 41°43′42″N 87°34′47″W
- Country: United States
- State: Illinois
- County: Cook
- City: Chicago
- Neighborhoods: list: Calumet Heights; Pill Hill

Area
  - Total: 1.77 sq mi (4.58 km^{2})

Population (2024)
  - Total: 11,229
  - Density: 6,350/sq mi (2,450/km^{2})

Demographics 2024
  - White: 0.3%
  - Black: 92.3%
  - Hispanic: 5.6%
  - Asian: 0.3%
  - Other: 1.5%

Educational Attainment 2024
  - High School Diploma or Higher: 94.2%
  - Bachelor's Degree or Higher: 39.5%
- Time zone: UTC-6 (CST)
  - Summer (DST): UTC-5 (CDT)
- ZIP Codes: parts of 60617, 60619
- Median household income: $49,923
- Source: U.S. Census, Record Information Services

Calumet Heights is one of the 77 community areas of Chicago in Illinois, United States. It is located on the South Side of the city.

Calumet Heights is bounded by 87th Street on the north, South Chicago Avenue on the east, and railroad lines on the west and south (along 95th Street).

== History ==
Calumet Heights was swampy and relatively unoccupied throughout the nineteenth century. In 1870, the Calumet and Chicago Canal Dock Company purchased the Stony Island Ridge. A railroad was built in 1881 along the western border of Calumet Heights leading to the development of the neighborhood. The area became part of the Village of Hyde Park in 1889. Shortly thereafter, Hyde Park Township was annexed by Chicago.

During the Chicago Freedom Movement, Calumet Heights was one of the few areas in which Martin Luther King Jr. received a positive reception in which he was hosted by a Calumet Heights business owner. During this same period, Dr. King was hit with a brick during a march in a white-majority area of Chicago.

== Demographics ==
The area that is now Calumet Heights was initially settled by Irish and German immigrants. Those residents were eventually replaced by Italian, Polish and Yugoslavian immigrants. In the 1960s, the first African American families moved to Calumet Heights and received a hostile reception. Unlike other communities that underwent white flight during this period, Calumet Heights maintained much of its wealth. As of 2015, the median income in Calumet Heights is slightly greater than that of Chicago at-large. This includes a greater percentage of Calumet Heights residents making $75,000 to $149,999 than Chicago at-large.

According to a 2017 analysis by the Chicago Metropolitan Agency for Planning, there were 13,732 people and 5,369 households in Calumet Heights. The racial makeup of the area was 2.2% White, 93.5% African American, and 1.0% from other races. Residents who self-identify as Hispanic or Latino of any race were 3.2% of the population. In the area, the population was spread out, with 20.1% under the age of 19, 13.3% from 20 to 34, 20.6% from 35 to 49, 21.9% from 50 to 64, and 24.2% who were 65 years of age or older. The median age was 46 years.

Historical population
Census	Pop.	Note	%±
1930	7,343		—
1940	7,417		1.0%
1950	9,349		26.0%
1960	19,352		107.0%
1970	20,123		4.0%
1980	20,505		1.9%
1990	17,453		−14.9%
2000	16,014		−8.2%
2010	16,431		2.6%
2020	13,088		−20.3%

== Economy ==
An analysis by the University of Illinois at Chicago's Great Cities Institute estimates there are 2,327 jobs in the Calumet Heights community area. The top employing industry sector in the Calumet Heights area is healthcare (58.7%). Healthcare is followed by accommodation and food (12.1%), retail trade (8.4%), administration (3.6%) and other service (3.5%). Over half of the workers in these fields reside outside of Chicago. 56% of Calumet Heights residents are in the labor force. 83% of those are considered to be employed and 17% to be unemployed. The top 5 employing industry sectors of community residents are healthcare (18.5%), education (14.1%), public administration (9.8%), administration (8.4%) and retail trade (8.2%). Over one third of Calumet Heights residents commute to Chicago's central business district and a little less than one third of Calumet Heights residents commute outside of Chicago.

The Commercial Avenue TIF district is partially located in Calumet Heights. Calumet Heights also includes a portion of Chicago Enterprise Zone 3. An enterprise zone is an economic development tool created by state statute which allows for various tax exemptions on activities related to development, including an exemption on taxes paid on building materials.

== Education ==
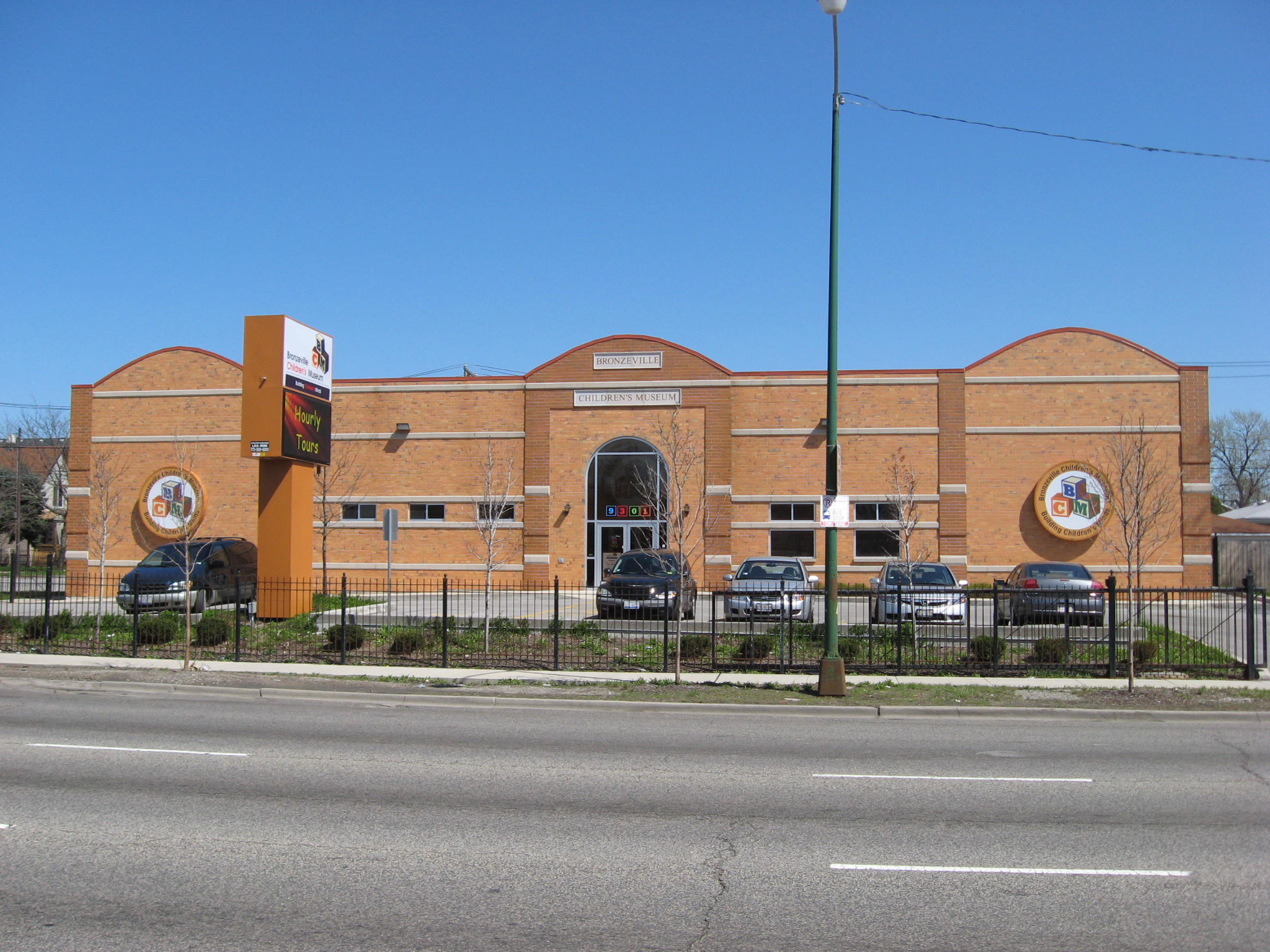
The Bronzeville Children's Museum at 9301 South Stony Island Avenue

Calumet Heights is part of City of Chicago School District #299 and City Colleges of Chicago District #508. The nearest City Colleges campus was Olive–Harvey College in Pullman. A high school diploma had been earned by 88.5% of Calumet Heights residents and a bachelor's degree had been earned by 27.4% of residents. The Bronzeville Children's Museum, the only children's museum in the United States focused on African-American history moved to Calumet Heights from Evergreen Park, Illinois in the early 2000s.

== Geography ==
Calumet Heights is bounded by 87th Street on the north, South Chicago Avenue on the east, and railroad lines on the west and south (along 95th Street). It includes the neighborhoods of Calumet Heights, Pill Hill, and Stony Island Heights. Beginning at about 91st Street and Constance Avenue is the geographical feature for which it was named, a stony hill that was once an island when glacial Lake Chicago covered the area thousands of years ago. Early pioneers gave this hill the name Stony Island because at a distance it looked like an island in set a trackless prairie sea. (See also the nearby Blue Island).

== Politics ==
Calumet Heights is a stronghold for the Democratic Party. In the 2016 presidential election, Calumet Heights cast 7,840 votes for Hillary Clinton and cast 184 votes Donald Trump. Despite this landslide victory, it was actually Clinton's 20th largest margin of victory by percentage points in the 76 community areas she won. In the 2012 presidential election, Calumet Heights cast 8,727 votes for Barack Obama and 95 votes for Mitt Romney. It was Obama's 18th largest margin of victory by percentage points in the 76 community areas he won.

At the local level, Calumet Heights is located in Chicago's 7th, 8th, and 10th represented by Democrats Gregory Mitchell, Michelle A. Harris, and Susie Sadlowski Garza respectively.

== Notable people ==
- Dorothy A. Brown, Clerk of the Circuit Court of Cook County (2000–present)
- Common, rapper, actor, and winner of the Academy Award for Best Original Song for Glory. He was raised in Calumet Heights.
- Greg Mitchell, Alderman from Chicago's 7th ward. He is a longtime resident of Calumet Heights.
