= Henry Rey =

Monegasque politician (1938/1939–2025)

Member of the National Council of Monaco
- In office 1968–2008

President of the Monégasque Olympic Committee
- In office 1975–1994

President of AS Monaco FC
- In office 1970–1972
- Preceded by: Edmond Aubert
- Succeeded by: Henri Orengo

Personal details
- Born: 1938 or 1939 Monaco
- Died: 13 January 2025 (aged 86)
- Political party: National and Democratic Union
- Parent: Jean-Charles Rey
- Occupation: Sporting director

Henry Rey (1938 or 1939 – 13 January 2025) was a Monegasque politician of the National and Democratic Union (UND).

== Life and career ==
Born in Monaco, Rey was the son of politician Jean-Charles Rey. From 1970 to 1972, he was president of the football club AS Monaco FC. From 1975 to 1994, he was president of the Monégasque Olympic Committee and while in this post, he was a co-founder of the Games of the Small States of Europe. He also succeeded his father in politics with the UND, serving in the National Council from 1968 to 2008. Furthermore, he was named a member of the Crown Council of Monaco and served as president of the Monte-Carlo Golf Club.

Henry Rey died on 13 January 2025, aged 86.

== Decorations ==
- Grand Officer of the Order of Saint Charles (2001)
