= Emlen Etting =

American painter and sculptor

Personal details
- Born: Emlen Pope Etting Jr. August 24, 1905 Philadelphia, Pennsylvania, US
- Died: July 20, 1993 (aged 87) Philadelphia, Pennsylvania, US
- Spouse: Gloria Braggiotti (after 1938)
- Education: St. George's School; Harvard University
- Occupation: Painter, sculptor, filmmaker

Military service
- Allegiance: United States
- Branch/service: Office of War Information
- Battles/wars: World War II

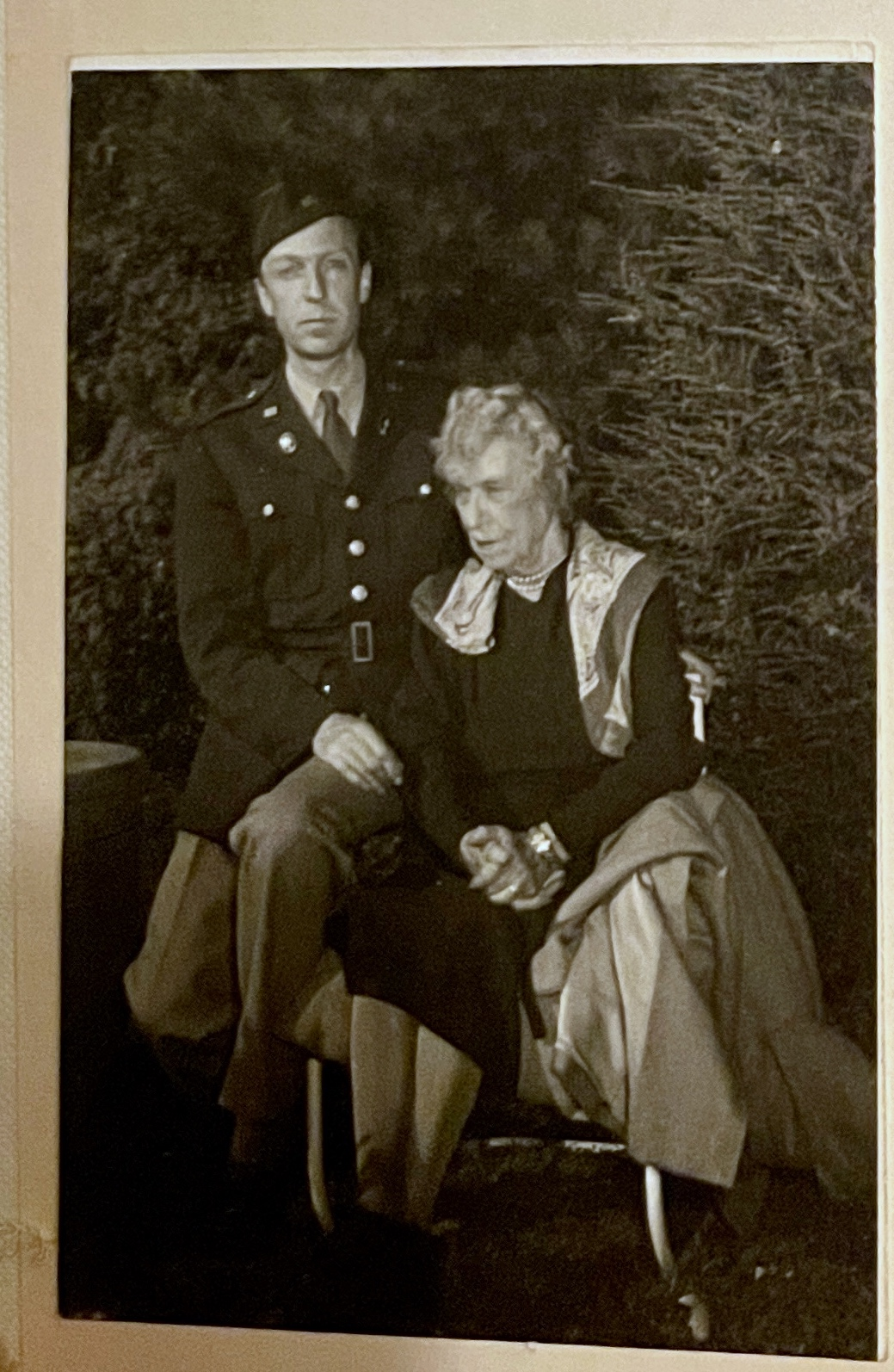
Taken in the French quarter just before he went off to fight the war 1944

Emlen Pope Etting Jr. (August 24, 1905 – July 20, 1993) was an American painter, sculptor, filmmaker, and member of Philadelphia's elite Main Line Society.

== Early life and education ==
He attended schools in Lausanne, Switzerland, and St. George's School in Middletown, Rhode Island. After graduating from Harvard in 1928, he studied with the artist Andre Lhote in Paris. During World War II, Etting served in the psychological warfare division of the Office of War Information. He was present at the liberation of Paris and he collaborated with Orson Welles to record the event.

== Family ==
Emlen Pope Etting Jr. was born to Florence Lucas Etting and Emlen Pope Etting Sr., a failed stockbroker, in 1905. Both Emlen's mother and aunt were proud members of Philadelphia's Main Line society. An earlier son was born to the Ettings on August 15, 1903, and given the name Emlen Pope Etting Jr. The child died just three days prior to his first birthday, on August 18, 1904. The following August 24, 1905, Florence gave birth to her second son and, once again, gave him the name of Emlen Pope Etting Jr. On October 23, 1905, when young Emlen was only two months old, his father died of a heart attack. Florence Etting died on April 13, 1951. Both his parents and the first Emlen Jr. are buried in West Laurel Hill Cemetery in Bala Cynwyd, Pennsylvania.

Emlen was reared in a European fashion as much as he was American. Emlen lived with his mother in Europe for much of his childhood. They returned to America in 1917 to avoid World War I.

Emlen's Aunt Harriet wanted to ensure Emlen grew to be the Philadelphia gentleman he was meant to be and enrolled him in St. George's School from 1920 to 1924. St. George's, an Episcopal boarding school, was considered at that time to be one of only two suitable options for a young man from Philadelphia's upper crust.

== Paris ==
Emlen studied French at Harvard University. After graduating, he traveled to Europe to study art. It was a lifestyle underwritten by his aunt, Harriet Etting Brown. He traveled to Munich but was drawn to life in Paris and into the tutelage of the artist Andre Lhote. Lhote taught his students to reduce their subjects into lines and shapes. Emlen remained influenced by Lhote, his teacher and mentor, for the rest of his life.

Paris had many forms of art and philosophy. He frequented the most exclusive art shows and enjoyed the avant-garde films screened in Paris Studio 28. It was in this period that Emlen mingled with many influential artists of the time.

In an interview with Marina Pacini from 1988, Emlen describes his experience studying under Lhote in Paris: “No, it was fluid. People came and went in the classes. You know, sometimes people came and somebody would be very annoyed at something he destroyed, something they’d done on a canvas, and they were horrified and would never come back. It was in America, I was fascinated when I came back. It was done more like, to please the student; you’d say something was good and never touch it. But Lhote would barge right in and the students, the whole class, would follow round behind, and he would take one easel, one painting at a time, and whatever he was emphasizing that day, he would rub it in, and how! Much to the, sometimes, students’ annoyance. The reason I'm telling you this is to explain why it was so fluid. There was no point in having a method of teaching composition one day, and one day color was that you got different people and you didn't follow through with it. And with his method you eventually got all the different facets if you stayed long enough.”

== Film ==
Etting made several short films. His personal favorite was Poem 8 (1932). As the name suggests the film attempts to use the cadence and narrative of the poem. From his interview with Marina Pacini:

"Dali was doing one, two in fact, and Cocteau did Blood of a Poet. And I thought, how interesting it would be if we used the film in a different method. So far it had been used like a novel to tell a story, or else as a documentary and there was nothing else in between, and I wanted to use the film as a poetic medium, to do a poem like T. S. Eliot’s poems, and do it entirely visually and that’s how I came about to do my film I called Poem 8 and as far as I know it was the first film that experimented in that as a poetic medium."

Etting uses very literal images of women, modes of travel, and his own body parts. In Poem 8, Etting shows the filmmaker as a present protagonist.

According to Kenneth C. Kaleta, PhD, author of a biography on Etting titled With the Rich and Mighty, both Poem 8 and Etting's other early experimental film, Oramunde, are “technologically unsophisticated, sometimes overly arty and labored,” but illustrate “Etting’s visionary insight into the promise of artistic expression as well as the potential of communication in cinema beyond filming linear plots.”

Etting made his mark in early film but as times changed, and he stopped working with the medium. From Ettings interview with Pacini:

While the films became so much more exciting that my little experiments were pitiful compared to the films of modern day. It isn’t that they do poems, but they do the experimentation that has brought the most fantastic results. We go to the movies now and we are absolutely bowled [over] with amazement with the marvels that they do in films. I think it is the great art of today."

== During the War ==
During World War II, Etting served in the psychological warfare division of the Office of War Information. He was present at the liberation of Paris and made many sketches of the event that were featured in periodicals of the time.

His duty was to disseminate the news of the progress of the D-Day invasion and, more importantly, to reassure the devastated villagers he encountered that they could rely on the assistance of US forces in rebuilding their war-torn lives. He wrote, presented, and recorded a series of daily news programs for the American Broadcasting Station in Europe in the towns he visited to accomplish this. Etting's responsibilities included recording the experiences of the newly liberated French townspeople he met in the wake of the military sweep of their occupied country for the US Army and reporting on what he observed in the field.

Etting pieced together and recorded this oral history. Upon his return home, he published Prodigal Flyer, a "true" story, about his experiences. He felt it was his duty to make a record of the moment, separating the fact from the fiction of war. However, he wanted, nor needed, any war souvenirs of the misery he saw: he never forget what he saw. He felt ashamed that there was such an outpouring of gratitude for him and his party when the appreciation, in his opinion, should be offered instead to the men who fought and died there.

Etting was subsequently attached to the Second French Armored Division.

Etting documented these historical events in The Liberation of Paris, a recording collaboration with Orson Welles, directed by Pierre Schaeffer. The 12-inch, 78 rpm, Asch 3 record English and French language set recorded the live speeches of Generals Dwight D. Eisenhower and Charles de Gaulle on August 25, 1944, accompanied by the commentary of Welles and the translation and commentary of Etting.

In addition to recording this experience professionally for broadcast and publication, on the day of the liberation of Paris, Etting also made a personal journey into the past, and perhaps, into his aesthetic and artistic process. The painter wrote in his journal that once the Allies had secured the city and he had fulfilled his military obligations, including requisitioning a jeep to confirm the welfare of Pablo Picasso, Etting made his way to Lhote's studio on the Rue l'Odessa. Etting was aware that as a Jew, Lhote had had to move from place to place, sleeping where and when he could in fear of the Gestapo, and Etting wondered whether his old teacher had survived the Nazis' four-year occupation of the city. When Etting arrived again at the Rue l’Odessa, Lhote was there and seemed unchanged. Lhote was agitated of course, all of Paris was frenzied, but an excruciating suspicion also plagued Lhote. He begged Etting to assist him. Lhote had to know whether the Luftwaffe had damaged the priceless Delacroix murals in the Palais du Luxembourg, which the Nazis had seized and occupied during the war, and evacuated in the preceding days.

== After the war ==
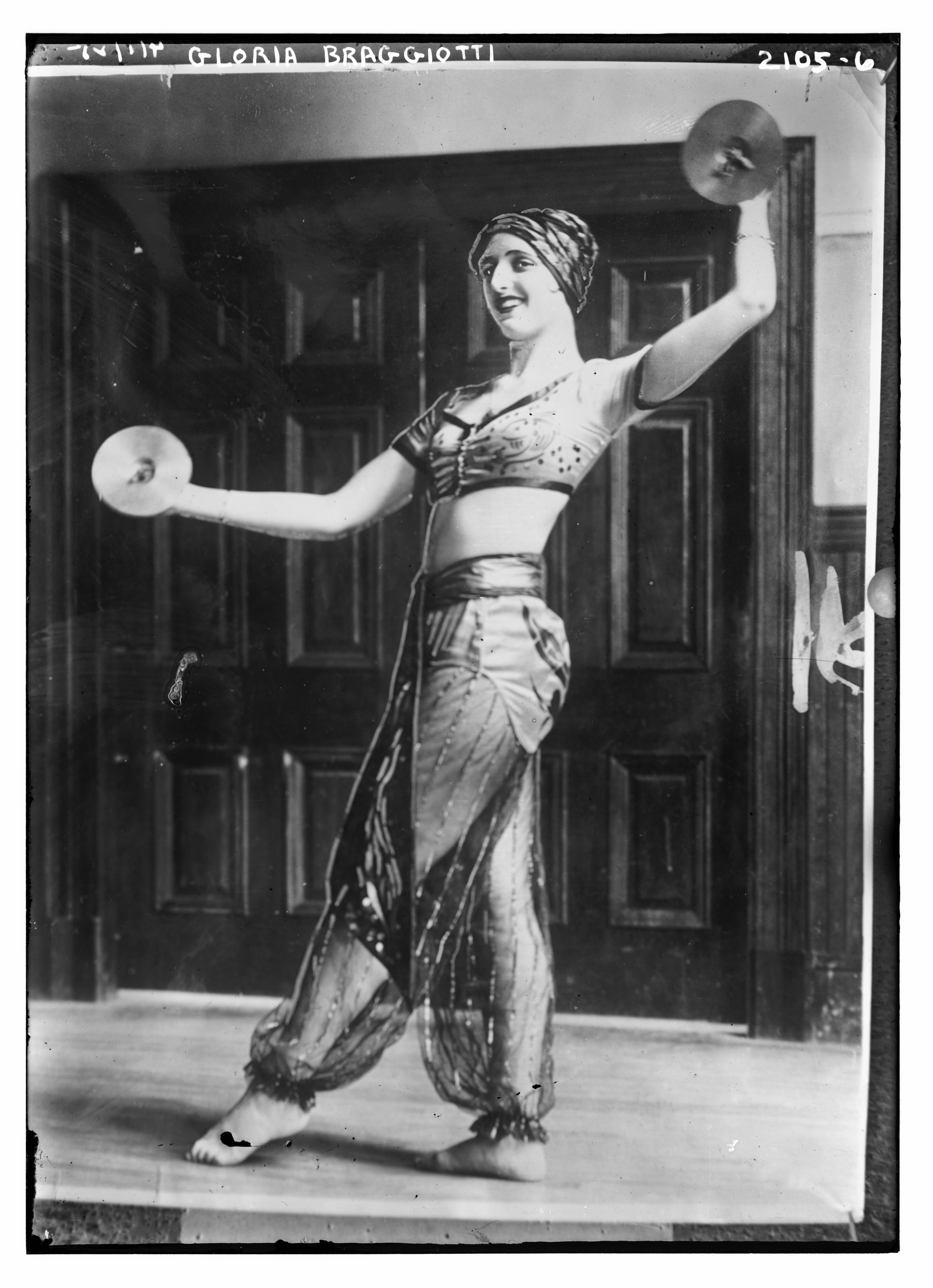
Photograph of his wife, Gloria Braggiotti Etting

After returning from World War II Etting immediately worked as an illustrator, but continued to paint and sculpt. He created a large catalogue of paintings and drawings and worked most every day, believing that an artist should work whether they felt the call of the muse or not. He artworks included "a lot of male nudes and paintings of sailors" and, today, his work is in the permanent collections of the Philadelphia Museum of Art, the Whitney Museum of American Art, the Allentown Art Museum, and the Museum of American Art at the Pennsylvania Academy of the Fine Arts.

Etting taught at the Philadelphia Museum of Art, the Philadelphia College of Art, Temple University's Tyler School of Art, and Florida Southern College.

In 1938, Etting was married to Gloria Braggiotti, the daughter of an Italian aristocrat and a Boston Brahmin mother, at the Church of the Transfiguration in New York City. Gloria was a fixture of Main Line society in her own right.

Etting's sculpture Phoenix Rising was installed in the plaza next to Philadelphia's City Hall in 1982. The sculpture symbolized Philadelphia's rise from urban decay.

Emlen Etting died of Parkinson's disease on July 20, 1993, at his home in Philadelphia at the age of 88.
