= Gloria Braggiotti Etting =

Italian-American dancer, newspaper columnist, photographer and writer

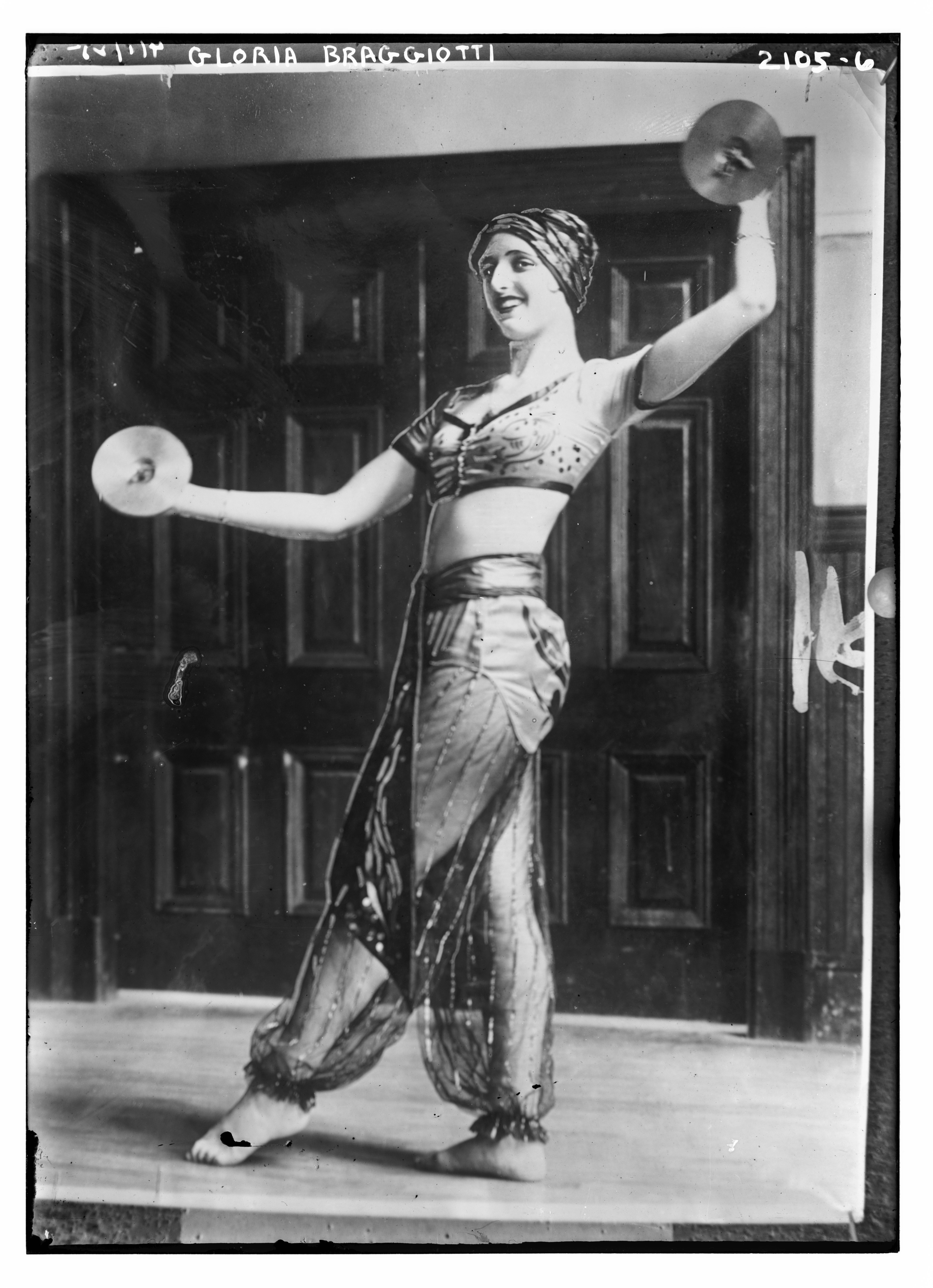
Gloria Braggiotti

Gloria Braggiotti Etting (1909 – 3 September 2003) was an American dancer, newspaper columnist, photographer, and writer. Her brother was composer Mario Braggiotti and her husband was artist Emlen Etting.

== Early life ==
Gloria Braggiotti was born in Florence, Italy, the youngest of eight children. Her father was an Italian tenor, born in Smyrna; her mother was an American mezzo-soprano from Boston. When her mother died in 1919, her father moved the family to Boston to be near her mother's relatives.

All the Braggiotti children displayed artistic talent at an early age. She studied modern dance under Ruth St. Denis and Ted Shawn in the couple's Lee, Massachusetts dance studio. Together, St. Denis and Shawn had established the Denishawn School of Dancing and Related Arts in Los Angeles in 1915. Her sisters Francesca Braggiotti and Berthe also studied dance. They later formed their own dance studio and often performed together during the 1920s.

== New York café society ==
Gloria moved to New York City in 1931. She struggled to find work as a dancer and actor. Her brother Mario Braggiotti was an accomplished composer and pianist who was even recognized by George Gershwin as a peer. During his performances in Manhattan, Mario would take Gloria to El Morocco and other exclusive nightclubs, but life was still a struggle for them both, as it was for many during the Great Depression.

"The depression years were very difficult for us professionally," she told a newspaper reporter in 1963, "and thrilling socially. We were out of jobs but in on everything else. We used to charge our breakfasts at the drugstore and then go to lavish parties given by people like Condé Nast and Cobina Wright."

She made her acquaintance at El Morocco with Maury Paul, perhaps the most famous café society columnist in New York who wrote under the pen name "Cholly Knickerbocker." He helped her to take over the "Madame Flutterbye" column at the New York Post and later a regular fashion column. She also met Lucius Beebe who wrote the weekly column, "This New York" for the New York Herald Tribune. Beebe, a native of Boston, liked the fact she was raised in Boston and they soon struck up a friendship. Beebe had an active evening social life as part of his duties to gather material for his column, and he often attended theater openings, operas and other functions with Gloria on his arm, after which they would drop in at El Morocco and, as Beebe would later write, see "the names that made news." Regulars at El Morocco sitting at Beebe's and Paul's table included Fred Astaire, Libby Holman, Gloria Swanson, and Clark Gable, with fashion designer Valentina Schlee and her husband, and Town & Country editor Harry Bull and his wife sitting nearby. Many were eagerly photographed by Jerome Zerbe with the photos appearing the New York papers and magazines.

== Life in Philadelphia ==
Gloria had met Emlen Etting while they were teenagers and he was attending St. George's School in Middletown, Rhode Island, near Newport. Etting became a prominent artist. The couple dated in New York City and Boston and in 1938, they were married. Etting's mother and aunt were prominent in the Philadelphia Main Line society, and the couple chose to move to Philadelphia. The next several decades were the most creative and productive of Gloria's life. She wrote for several Philadelphia papers as well as Town & Country. Her husband served during World War II and after the war, she became a successful hostess in the city's Main Line. The Etting's home became a popular meeting place in Philadelphia for their friends and prominent acquaintances.

She published her autobiography Born In A Crowd in 1957 which described her youth growing up in the large Braggiotti household in Florence. She took up photography and she used this as a creative tool during her many travels around the world which she wrote about. The Ettings had no children but the home in Philadelphia was rarely quiet. In 1968, she published Philadelphia, The Intimate City, a social history. Emlen Etting died in 1993. That same year she self-published a book, By The Way, of her collected photographs. These photographs and many others she had made were donated to the Philadelphia Museum of Art. In 1998 she married Alesandro Buonacuore and the couple moved to Florida. Some years later, they moved to Syracuse, Sicily where she died in 2003.
