= Sam Kelley =

American playwright and professor

Samuel L Kelley
- Born: June 23, 1948 (age 78); Tennessee, U.S.
- Education: University of Arkansas, Fayetteville (BA, MA); Yale University (MFA); University of Michigan, Ann Arbor (PhD)
- Occupations: Playwright and Professor
- Writing career
- Period: 1970–present

Samuel Lawrence Kelley is an American playwright and Distinguished Service Professor Emeritus, Communication Studies and Africana Studies, State University of New York College at Cortland. He has also organized the SUNY Cortland Gospel Music Festival since 1985.

== Education ==
Kelley earned a B.A. in speech and drama from the University of Arkansas at Pine Bluff; M.A. in speech from the University of Arkansas at Fayetteville; and the MFA in play-writing from the Yale School of Drama. He also holds a Ph.D. in speech, with a concentration in radio-TV-film, from the University of Michigan.

== Works ==
=== Plays ===
- Pill Hill
- Habeas Corpus
- The Blue Vein Society
- Faith, Hope and Charity: The Story of Mary McLeod Bethune
- Thruway Diaries
- Beautiful Game
- A Hero For McBride
- White Chocolate
- Retirement Blues
- No Hidin' Place
- God Is My Witness
