= Poussaint =

Poussaint is a surname. Notable people with the surname include:

- Alvin Francis Poussaint (1934–2025), American psychiatrist and author
- Renee Poussaint (1944–2022), American broadcast journalist and educator
- Tina Young Poussaint, American radiologist and neuroradiologist
