= Puppet Showplace =

Puppet theater in Massachusetts

Puppet Showplace Theater
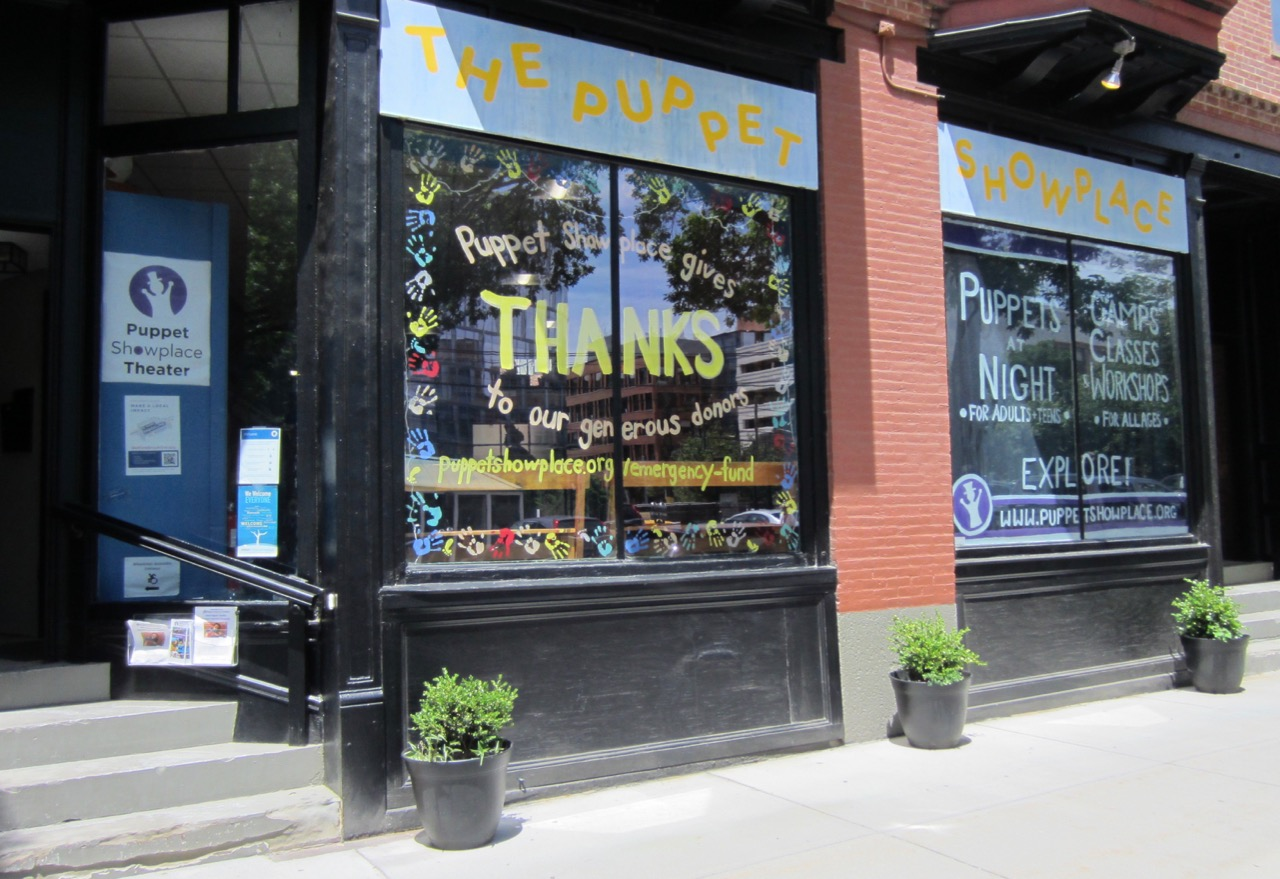
- Entrance to Puppet Showplace Theater (2021)
- Interactive map of Puppet Showplace Theater
- Address: 32 Station Street; Brookline, Massachusetts
- Coordinates: 42.33301°N 71.11681°W
- Type: Theater
- Event: Puppetry
- Public transit: Green Line (D branch) Brookline Village

Construction
- Opened: June 1974

Website
- www.puppetshowplace.org

Puppet Showplace Theater is a nonprofit puppet theater in Brookline, Massachusetts. The organization was founded in June 1974 by Mary Churchill. Since 1981, it has been located at 32 Station Street. The theater presents performances by local and traveling professional puppet companies.

Puppet Showplace Theater houses one performance space, a proscenium with a "comfortable capacity" of 80 adults. Each year, it presents over 300 performances at its home in Brookline. The theater also presents touring productions performed in schools, libraries, and cultural centers throughout the Northeastern United States.

== History ==
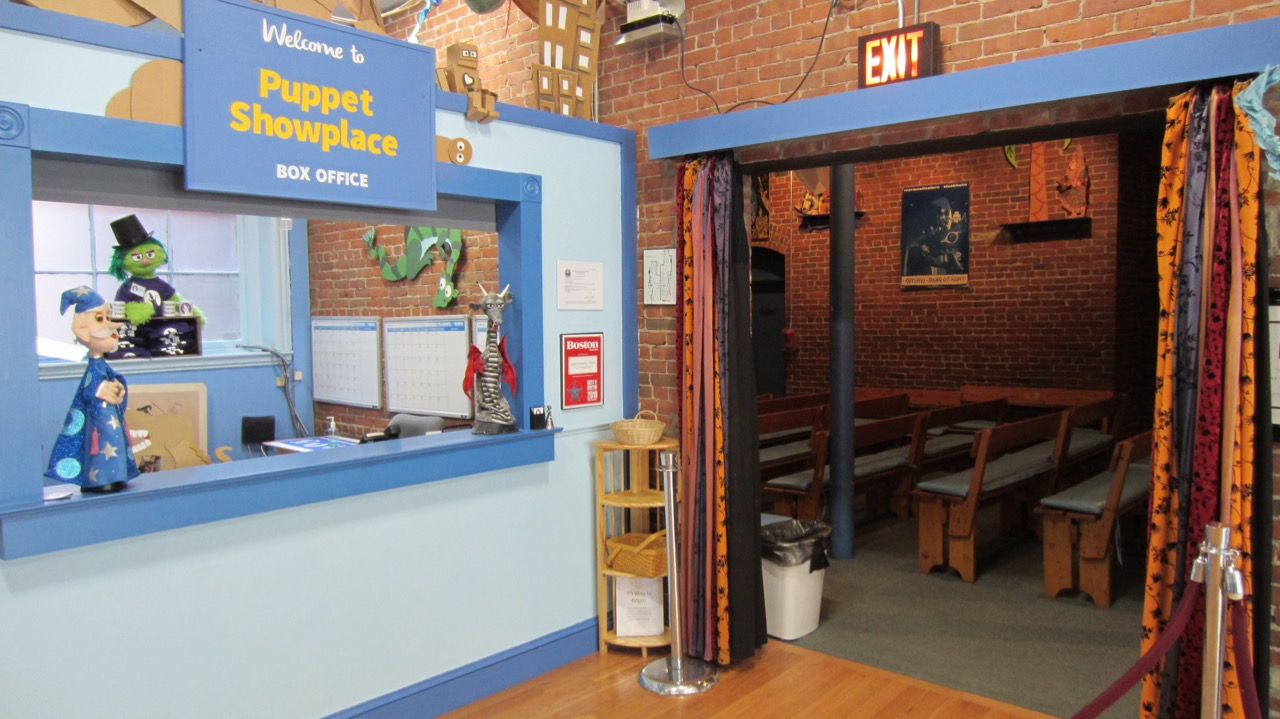
Box office and entrance to performance space (2021)

=== 1974–1999 ===
Puppet Showplace Theater was founded in June 1974 in Brookline, Massachusetts by Mary Churchill. As a teacher in the Boston school system, she had used puppets to teach students who had trouble learning to read. Later, Churchill began creating her own puppet shows. She named her company The Cranberry Puppets.

After leaving teaching, Churchill found a vacant storefront at 30 Station Street in the historic Building at 30–34 Station Street. It was located in her neighborhood of Brookline Village across from the Brookline Village (MBTA station). Churchill acquired the property and began to offer her own shows on weekends. Soon, other puppeteers from Greater Boston began performing there as well. Performers included Eleanor Boylan, Elizabeth Clark, and Caleb Fullam and Company.

In 1976, at a Russian puppet festival, Churchill met hand puppet artist Paul Vincent Davis. He became the theater's first artist in residence. Davis held the position for 33 years. He also served as the theater's artistic director. Davis and Churchill became lifelong companions and partners.

By 1978, Showplace served as the information center for the Puppeteers of America and Union Internationale de la Marionette. Performers included Susan Linn, Ruth Brand as Henrietta the Clown, and George Latshaw.

In 1980, storefront properties became available at 32-33 Station Street. Churchill acquired the properties, removed a shared wall, and moved the theater next door in 1981. The new space was twice the size of the previous location. It had a small lobby, store, accessible restroom, and space for birthday parties and workshops. Showplace celebrated by premiering "Beauty and the Beast," a lavish production by Paul Vincent Davis.

Over time, the theater became a venue for puppeteers visiting from across the United States and around the world. Puppet Showplace Theater grew "from a few weekend shows to an internationally recognized puppetry center." It also served as a meeting space for the Boston Area Guild of Puppetry.

=== 2000–present ===
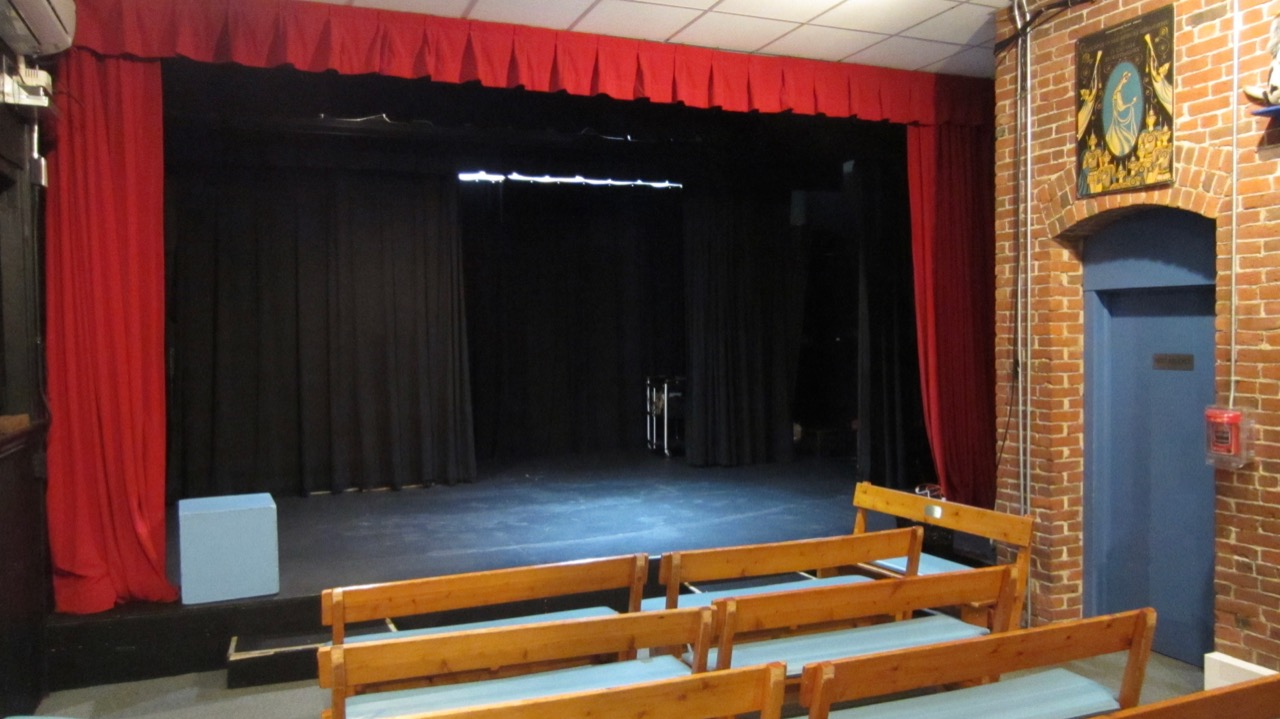
Performance space (2021)

In 2000, Karen Larsen succeeded Davis as artistic director.

In 2007, Puppet Showplace created the Mary Churchill Memorial Fund. It honors "her legacy of generosity and her commitment to making arts accessible to all." The fund brings schoolchildren from low-income neighborhoods to see puppetry at Showplace.

In 2008, Davis retired as artist in residence. Brad Shur succeeded him in 2009. During his tenure, Shur created five original shows, including Dr. Doohickey's Monster Machine, The Magic Soup and Other Stories, Tall Tales, and Robin Hood. In 2016, Shur received a Family Grant from The Jim Henson Foundation for his production Cardboard Explosion! It was an interactive work of puppet theater for family audiences.

By 2009, Kathleen Conroy Mukwashi was artistic director. Roxanna Myhrum became artistic director in 2010. During her tenure, she developed adult education programs, school residencies, and tours. Myhrum also helped expand the Incubator project night into a program that partnered with local artists to develop new work. Incubator went on to launch 15 full-length touring productions.

In 2016, Puppet Showplace partnered with Franklin Park Zoo to present The Midnight Zoo. The Halloween nighttime trail walk featured life-size fantasy creatures.

In 2017, Sarah Nolen became the theater's third resident artist. After joining Showplace, she debuted two new shows: The Fairy Tailor in 2018 and Judy Saves the Day in 2019. In 2022, Nolen received a Family Grant from The Jim Henson Foundation for her production Party Animals. The show follows four young animals as they prepare for their first party.

In March 2020, performances at the theater were suspended due to the COVID-19 pandemic. In October 2021, the theater resumed live, in-person performances while continuing virtual performances.

In June 2020, in the wake of the George Floyd protests, Puppet Showplace opened applications for a Black Puppeteer Empowerment Grant & Creative Research Residency. The grant offered five Black artists $1,000 grants to support the research and development of new projects.

== Operations ==
From the beginning, Mary Churchill served as the theater's principal administrator and benefactor. In The Boston Globe, Lynda Morgenroth wrote, "The Puppet Showplace is the house Mary Churchill built."

Following Churchill's death in 1997, Paul Vincent Davis became executive director. He held the position for three years. Joe Callahan became executive director in 2004. By 2007, Kris Higgins held the position. Isabel Fine was executive director by 2011. Thom Yarnal became executive director in 2013. Veronica Barron was named Executive Artistic Director in 2023.

== Notable productions ==
While serving as artist in residence, Paul Vincent Davis earned Citations of Excellence from UNIMA-USA for five productions. These include The Leprechaun of Donegal (1980), The Golden Axe (1982), Three Festival Dances (1982), Beauty and the Beast (1984), and Fables of Ancient Rome (1988).

In 2013, the production of Squirrel Stole My Underpants by Bonnie Duncan and The Gottabees premiered at Puppet Showplace Theater. In 2017, the production earned a Citation of Excellence from UNIMA-USA.

== Reception ==
In 2004, Puppet Showplace Theater received an Elliot Norton Award Special Citation for its 30 years of productions. Boston magazine named Puppet Showplace Theater as "2018 Best Kids' Birthday Venue." In 2020, Boston Parents Paper named Puppet Showplace Theater a Family Favorite. It won in the category of Live Theater in Greater Boston.
