= Mary Churchill (puppeteer) =

American puppeteer (1930–1997)

Mary Phipps Putnam Churchill (December 29, 1930 – November 16, 1997) was an American puppeteer, educator, and entrepreneur. Her puppet troupe, The Cranberry Puppets, entertained children for 25 years with witty feminist adaptations of folktales. Churchill was founder and director of Puppet Showplace Theater in Brookline, Massachusetts.

== Early life and education ==
Churchill was born in Boston, Massachusetts. Churchill attended Radcliffe College and Barnard College (Class of 1952). She studied economics and government. In 1968, she earned a Master of Arts degree from Simmons College.

== Career ==
Churchill taught elementary grades in the Boston school system. She taught third grade in Roxbury and was a reading specialist in Newton. There, she began using puppets to teach students who had trouble learning to read.

Churchill started reading books about puppets and making them. In 1972, she joined her local puppetry guild and took workshops. Then she attended an international puppetry festival in France. She returned determined to be a puppeteer and to have her own theater.

=== Cranberry Puppets ===
Churchill began to crochet hand puppets and create her own puppet shows. In 1973, she founded The Cranberry Puppets and performed plays for children. She named her signature puppet "Betsy."

Churchill performed witty adaptations of fairy tales and fables. These included "Little Red Riding Hood," "Three Billy Goats Gruff," "The Lion and the Mouse," and "The Three Bears." She also performed "Devil in the Pumpkin Patch" and "The Witch Who Hates Birthdays."

Her adaptations featured strong female protagonists. In Churchill's versions, female characters were the heroes. Her version of "The Three Little Pigs" included a smart female pig named Mary. Mary was a dentist who avoided being eaten by pulling out the teeth of the Big Bad Wolf.

=== Puppet Showplace Theater ===
In 1974, Churchill founded Puppet Showplace Theater. She located the theater in her neighborhood of Brookline Village. Churchill became a regular performer with The Cranberry Puppets. She also served as the theater's principal administrator and benefactor.

Over the next two decades, Puppet Showplace grew. It went "from a few weekend shows to an internationally recognized puppetry center." Churchill showcased performers from across the United States and around the world. She also offered meeting space for the Boston Area Guild of Puppetry.

The Puppetry Journal called Churchill the "driving force" behind Puppet Showplace Theater. In The Boston Globe, Lynda Morgenroth wrote, "The Puppet Showplace is the house Mary Churchill built."

== Personal life ==
Churchill was the mother of four children: Jean, John, Bill, and Charles.

In 1976, Churchill attended an international puppetry conference in Moscow, Russia. There, she met puppeteer Paul Vincent Davis. He became her lifelong companion and partner. Davis served as Artist in Residence at Puppet Showplace for over 30 years.

Churchill died of lung cancer on Sunday, November 16, 1997, at her home in Brookline. She was 66.

== Legacy ==
Churchill saw puppetry as a powerful medium. It could teach children, stimulate their creativity, and introduce them to live theater.

In 2007, Puppet Showplace created the Mary Churchill Memorial Fund. It honors "her legacy of generosity and her commitment to making arts accessible to all." The fund brings schoolchildren from low-income neighborhoods to see puppetry at Showplace.
