= Susan Linn =

American writer, psychologist, and ventriloquist

- Education: Ed.D.
- Alma mater: Harvard University
- Occupations: Writer; psychologist; ventriloquist

Susan Linn is an American writer, psychologist, and ventriloquist. She is the cofounder of Campaign for a Commercial-Free Childhood and author of the book Consuming Kids. She is a research associate at Boston Children's Hospital and a lecturer at Harvard Medical School.

== Early life and education ==
Linn graduated from Harvard University with a degree in Education and Counseling Psychology.

== Career ==
Linn is a ventriloquist who has performed in various locations, including Puppet Showplace Theater. She also performed on Mister Rogers' Neighborhood. Her characters included Audrey Duck, Cat-a-lion, and Timberlane Wolf.

Linn became a puppet therapist at Boston Children's Hospital.

In 2004, Linn published her book Consuming Kids: The Hostile Takeover of Childhood.

With Alvin Poussaint, Linn is the cofounder of the Campaign for a Commercial-Free Childhood, a non-profit organization dedicated to protecting children from deceptive advertising. She worked for the organization from its founding in 2000 through 2015 when she left to focus on writing and teaching. Linn also appeared in The Greatest Movie Ever Sold, a 2011 documentary about marketing and advertising.

In 2022, Linn published her book Who's Raising The Kids? Big Tech, Big Business and the Lives of Children.
