= Paul Vincent Davis =

Paul Vincent Davis may refer to:

- Paul Davis (footballer, born 1961), English footballer
- Paul Vincent Davis (puppeteer) (1935–2025), American puppeteer
