= Building at 30–34 Station Street =

- U.S. National Register of Historic Places
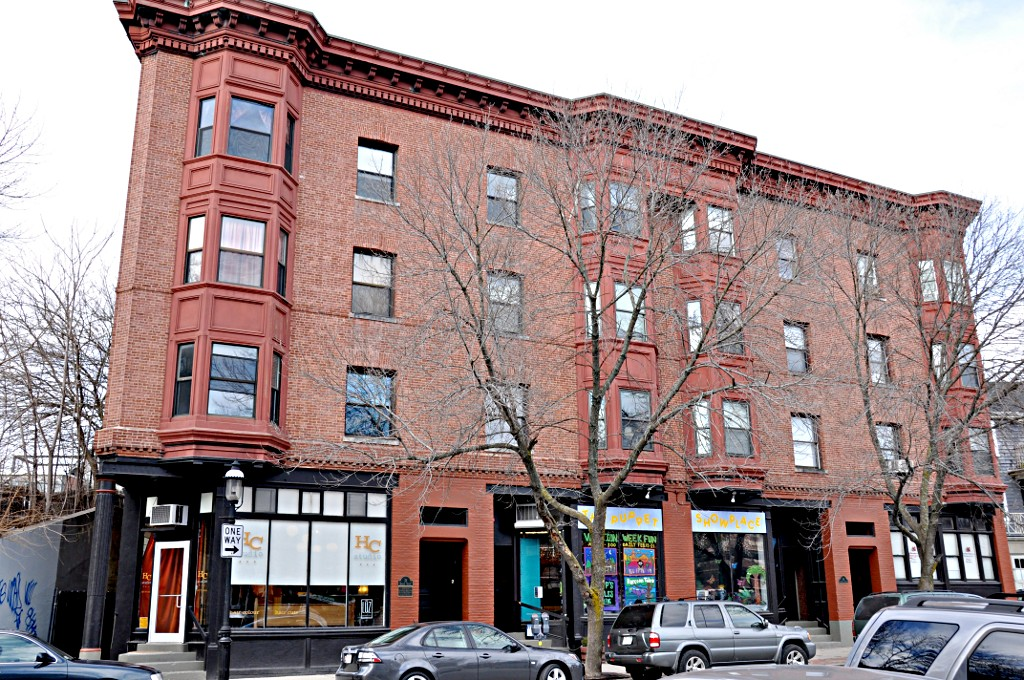

- Location within Massachusetts Location within the United States
- Location: 30–34 Station St., Brookline, Massachusetts
- Coordinates: 42°19′58.7″N 71°7′0.8″W
- Area: less than one acre
- Built: 1892
- Architect: Winslow & Wetherell
- Architectural style: Colonial Revival, Georgian Revival
- MPS: Brookline MRA
- NRHP reference No.: 85003250
- Added to NRHP: October 17, 1985

The Building at 30–34 Station Street in Brookline, Massachusetts, is a historic mixed-use residential/commercial building. It was designed by architects Winslow & Wetherell with elements of Colonial Revival and Georgian Revival style, and was completed in 1893. It is one of the first examples in Brookline of a mixed-use building. It was listed on the National Register of Historic Places in 1985.

== Description and history ==
Station Street is a short commercial street in Brookline Village, paralleling the tracks of the MBTA Green Line D branch between Washington and Kent Streets. 30–34 Station Street is on north side, roughly midway on the block and opposite the Brookline Village station. It is a four-story building, built out of brick and covered by a flat roof. The ground floor houses four storefronts articulated by cast iron columns, and the upper floors have eight bays, four of which consist of projecting polygonal bays. It has a deep bracketed cornice, and a band of dentil brickwork between the first and second floors. The building, then as now, housed stores on the first floor and residences above. Since 1974, it has housed Puppet Showplace Theater, the only theater dedicated to the art of puppetry in the Boston area and one of fewer than 50 puppet theaters in the United States.

The building was designed by Winslow & Wetherell, a Boston architectural firm, and completed in 1893 for Arthur Cobb, a Boston merchant and real estate developer. Cobb's other Brookline properties included a stone rowhouse on Walnut Street and a second commercial block with six storefronts on Station Street.

== See also ==
- National Register of Historic Places listings in Brookline, Massachusetts
