= National Emigration Convention =

Meeting of African Americans advocating for their civil rights

The National Emigration Convention was a meeting of African Americans advocating for their civil rights and discussing the need for political representation. It was held in Cleveland, Ohio, from August 24 to 26 of 1854. Articles and letters documented its discussions and debates. It was led by Martin Delany. A. A. Anderson published the 77-page Proceedings of the National Emigration Convention of Colored People Held at Cleveland, Ohio, On Thursday, Friday, and Saturday, The 24th, 25th, and 26th of August, 1854 in Pittsburgh in 1854.

Women delegates included Mary Ann Shadd Cary. A Board of Commissioners headquartered in Pittsburgh was chosen with Delany as president and William Webb and Charles W. Nighten as commissioners. Nighten lived in New Castle, Pennsylvania.

John Malvin requested to speak at the convention in opposition to emigration but was denied. Malvin was a carpenter in Virginia before settling in Cleveland, Ohio. He was a civil rights leader, school organizer, and became a leader in the Colored Conventions Movement.

Canada, Africa, Central America, and South America were proposed as locations for settlement. Martin Delany visited Liberia and made plans to assist Blacks in relocating there.

A second convention was held in 1856. Delany led the emigration movement until it peaked in 1861. Frederick Douglass was not invited to participate.

== See also ==
- Back-to-Africa movement
- Black Nationalism
- Colored Conventions Movement
- James Monroe Whitfield
