= Renee Poussaint =

American broadcast journalist (1944–2022)

Renee Francine Poussaint
- Born: August 12, 1944; New York City
- Died: March 4, 2022 (aged 77); Washington D.C.
- Relatives: Alvin Francis Poussaint (uncle)

Renee Poussaint (August 12, 1944 – March 4, 2022) was an Emmy Award-winning American broadcast journalist and educator known for reporting and advocacy related to Black history.

== Early life and education ==
Poussaint was born on August 12, 1944, in Manhattan and grew up in Spanish Harlem. Following her parents' divorce, she was raised primarily by her mother and family who emphasized the importance of education. Her uncle, Alvin Francis Poussaint, is a psychiatrist who consulted on The Cosby Show. Poussaint graduated from Sarah Lawrence College in 1964 with a B.A. in English literature and completed an M.A. in African studies at UCLA in 1970. During her undergraduate studies she also took courses at Yale Law School and Sorbonne University in Paris, France.

Poussaint began doctoral studies in comparative literature at the Indiana University before changing course after students expressed that they got most of their information from television. She enrolled in a journalism program at Columbia University in 1973 and was hired as a news writer in by WBBM-TV the same year.

== Career ==
In 1967, after completing her undergraduate studies, Poussaint danced with the Jean Leon Destine Haitian Dance Company. She edited the Los Angeles Based African Arts Magazine from 1969 to 1973 and worked as a translator at the University of California in 1970.

Poussaint's broadcast career started in 1973 in Chicago. She began working as a Washington correspondent for CBS News in the mid-1970s and was hired in 1978 by WJLA-TV as an evening and late-night news co-anchor. In the mid-1970s she worked at WBBM-TV, hosting the lunch hour program Channel 2: The People. Poussaint would go on to work for ABC News, often sitting in for Peter Jennings on World News Tonight and appearing as a correspondent for PrimeTime Live and in news segments on Good Morning America.

In 2001 Poussaint founded the National Visionary Leadership Project in 2001 with Camille Cosby. Funded by Camille and husband Bill Cosby, the oral history project interviewed Black elders who were 70 years of age and older. Included among the interviewees were Maya Angelou, Roscoe Lee Browne, Shirley Chisholm, and Katherine Dunham. Some of the interviews compiled by the organization were featured in the 2007 book A Wealth of Wisdom: Legendary African American Elders Speak, which was co-edited by Poussaint and Camille Cosby.

Poussaint was also the founder of her own non-profit company, Wisdom Works, which produced the documentary film Tutu and Franklin: A Journey Towards Peace that examined racial reconciliation with South African Archbishop Desmond Tutu and American historian John Hope Franklin.

Later in life Poussaint taught at the University of Maryland's Philip Merrill College of Journalism.

== Awards ==
Poussaint won three Emmy Awards over the course of her career. She was recognized for reporting about Haitian migrant workers at a labor camp on Maryland's Eastern Shore, an account of the return of the American hostages from Iran, and a profile about Washington Commanders owner Jack Kent Cooke.

== Death ==
Poussaint died of lung cancer on March 4, 2022, at her home in D.C. A service in her honor was held at the Plymouth Congregational United Church of Christ.

== Publications ==
- Cosby, Camille O.; Poussaint, Renee, eds. (2007). A Wealth of Wisdom: Legendary African American Elders Speak (1st Washington Square Press trade pbk. ed.). New York: Washington Square. ISBN 9780743482295.
