= Tina Young Poussaint =

American radiologist and academic

- Education: Yale School of Medicine; Mount Holyoke College
- Scientific career
- Workplaces: Massachusetts General Hospital; Boston Children's Hospital; Harvard Medical School

Tina Young Poussaint is a professor of radiology at the Harvard Medical School and a Neuroradiologist at the Boston Children's Hospital. In 2010 she served as president of the American Society of Pediatric Neuroradiology.

== Early life and education ==
Poussaint was born in Rochester, New York. Poussaint's father, Lionel W. Young, was a pediatric radiologist and her mother, Florence, is a retired podiatrist. Poussaint earned a Bachelor of Arts in mathematics and biology at Mount Holyoke College. She graduated magna cum laude and was elected to the Phi Beta Kappa honour society. For her graduate studies she moved to Yale School of Medicine, where she first met Valerie E. Stone. In their class at Yale there were three African-American women out of 102 students. As a medical student at Yale Poussaint was elected to the Alpha Omega Alpha. She graduated in 1983.

== Research and Professional Career ==
Poussaint completed her residency in diagnostic radiology at the Massachusetts General Hospital, becoming the first African American woman to do so. In 1989 she became the first African-American attending physician in radiology at Massachusetts General Hospital.

Poussaint joined the Department of Radiology at Boston Children's Hospital in 1993. She was made director of the Neuroimaging Center for the Pediatric Brain Tumor Consortium at Boston Children's Hospital in 2003. In 2011 Poussaint was made a full professor in radiology at the Harvard Medical School. Her research considers the refinement of magnetic resonance imaging, with a focus on the diagnosis of brain tumors in children. She was made the inaugural Lionel W. Young Chair in Radiology at Boston Children's Hospital. In December 2024, Poussaint was elected to the board of directors of the Radiological Society of North America (RSNA), where she serves as the board liaison for publications.

== Awards and honours ==
- 2010 President of the American Society of Pediatric Neuroradiology
- 2013 Inducted as a Fellow into the American College of Radiology
- 2017 American Society of Pediatric Neuroradiology Gold Medal Award

== Selected publications ==
=== Papers ===
- Gururangan, Sridharan; Chi, Susan N.; Young Poussaint, Tina; Onar-Thomas, Arzu; Gilbertson, Richard J.; Vajapeyam, Sridhar; Friedman, Henry S.; Packer, Roger J.; Rood, Brian N.; Boyett, James M.; Kun, Larry E. (2010-06-20). "Lack of Efficacy of Bevacizumab Plus Irinotecan in Children With Recurrent Malignant Glioma and Diffuse Brainstem Glioma: A Pediatric Brain Tumor Consortium Study". Journal of Clinical Oncology. 28 (18): 3069–3075. doi:10.1200/JCO.2009.26.8789. ISSN 0732-183X. PMC 2903337. PMID 20479404.
- MacDonald, Tobey J.; Stewart, Clinton F.; Kocak, Mehmet; Goldman, Stewart; Ellenbogen, Richard G.; Phillips, Peter; Lafond, Deborah; Poussaint, Tina Young; Kieran, Mark W.; Boyett, James M.; Kun, Larry E. (2008-02-20). "Phase I Clinical Trial of Cilengitide in Children With Refractory Brain Tumors: Pediatric Brain Tumor Consortium Study PBTC-012". Journal of Clinical Oncology. 26 (6): 919–924. doi:10.1200/jco.2007.14.1812. ISSN 0732-183X. PMID 18281665.
- Poussaint, T. Y.; Siffert, J.; Barnes, P. D.; Pomeroy, S. L.; Goumnerova, L. C.; Anthony, D. C.; Sallan, S. E.; Tarbell, N. J. (1995-04-01). "Hemorrhagic vasculopathy after treatment of central nervous system neoplasia in childhood: diagnosis and follow-up". American Journal of Neuroradiology. 16 (4): 693–699. ISSN 0195-6108. PMC 8332247. PMID 7611024.

=== Books ===
- Adesina, Adekunle M.; Tihan, Tarik; Fuller, Christine E.; Poussaint, Tina Young, eds. (2016). Atlas of Pediatric Brain Tumors (2 ed.). Springer International Publishing. ISBN 978-3-319-33430-1.
- Poussaint, Tina Young, ed. (2016). Pediatric Neuroradiology: A Case-Based Review. Springer International Publishing. ISBN 9781441975560.

== Personal life ==
Tina Young married Alvin Poussaint in 1992. Her husband was a professor of Psychiatry at the Harvard Medical School.
