= LaShyra Nolen =

American medical student and science communicator

- Born: 1995 (age 30–31); Compton, California
- Education: Harvard Kennedy School; Harvard Medical School; Loyola Marymount University
- Known for: Activism; Social media

LaShyra "Lash" Nolen (born 1995) is an American medical student and science communicator. She is the first Black woman to become class president of the Harvard Medical School. In 2020, Nolen was selected by The Root as one of their Young Futurists.

== Early life and education ==
Nolen was born in Compton, California. She grew up in Los Angeles and spent the later part of her childhood in Rancho Cucamonga. During her third grade of school, Nolen competed in a school science competition, where she studied the patterns of fish. After winning first place, Nolen told her grandmother that she either wanted to become a brain surgeon or an astronaut. She attended Los Osos High School where she served as class president all four years. Nolen attended Loyola Marymount University (LMU) where she studied health and human sciences. At LMU she served as the student body president and was involved in voter registration programs. As part of her undergraduate research, Nolen created a diabetes management programme for women at a domestic violence shelter. She was the first member of her family to earn a bachelor's degree in science.

Nolen was made a Fulbright scholar in 2017, and moved to A Coruña where she worked in public health. Her research involved understanding how Spanish people understood obesity. On her return, Nolen joined the AmeriCorps programme as a health coach at the Heartland Innovation Centre in Chicago. Here she led initiatives to improve clinic accessibility and improve awareness of health programmes.

She started her medical degree at Harvard Medical School in 2019. That year, Nolen became the first Black woman to be elected class president of the Harvard Medical School. Under her guidance, the medical school took part in more outreach programmes and recognised the work of non-academic members of the community. She is an activist for racial equality, and has spoken about the healthcare inequality experienced by Black people in the United States. In 2020, Nolen was selected by The Root as one of their Young Futurists.

== Research ==
Nolen has studied healthcare inequality in the United States, with a particular focus on why ethnic minorities were so at-risk from coronavirus disease.

Nolen has helped to eradicate racism from academic medicine and medical education. She has provided a series of guidance for clinicians, academics and medical educators, including encouraging people do their homework before reaching out to Black colleagues, reflecting on their workplaces and personal practise and compensating Black trainees for their time. Her June 2020 New England Journal of Medicine perspective “How Medical Education Is Missing the Bull’s-eye”, summarised the failings of academic medical programmes at training a generation of non-biased physicians.

During the COVID-19 pandemic Nolen launched the We Got Us project, which looked to provide accurate information and support to the Boston community throughout the pandemic.

== Awards and honors ==
- 2017 Fulbright Scholar
- 2020 The Root Young Futurist
- 2020 National Minority Quality Forum 40 under 40 Leader in Health
- 2021 Boston Celtics Hero Among Us
- 2021 Racial Justice in Medicine Award
- 2022 Forbes 30 Under 30
