= Martin Delany =

American physician, soldier, and black nationalist (1812–1885)

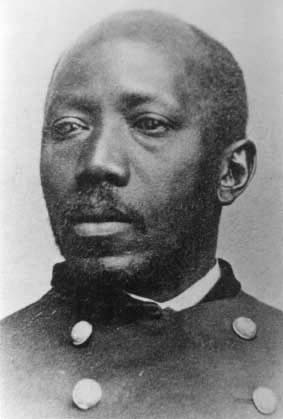
- Born: Martin Robison Delany; May 6, 1812; Charles Town, Virginia (now West Virginia), U.S.
- Died: January 24, 1885 (aged 72); Wilberforce, Ohio, U.S.
- Burial place: Massies Creek Cemetery; Cedarville, Ohio, U.S.
- Spouse: Catherine A. Richards
- Military career
- Allegiance: United States
- Branch: United States Army; Union Army
- Service years: 1863–1865
- Rank: Major
- Conflicts: American Civil War

Martin Robison Delany (May 6, 1812 – January 24, 1885) was an American abolitionist, journalist, physician, military officer, and writer. Delany was an early and influential proponent of black nationalism. Delany is credited with the Pan-African slogan of "Africa for Africans." Born as a free person of color in Charles Town, Virginia (now Charles Town, West Virginia), and raised in Chambersburg and Pittsburgh, Pennsylvania, Delany trained as a physician's assistant. During the cholera epidemics of 1833 and 1854 in Pittsburgh, Delany treated patients, even though many doctors and residents fled the city out of fear of contamination. In this period, people did not know how the disease was transmitted.

In 1839, Delany traveled in the South to observe slavery firsthand. Beginning in 1847, he worked alongside Frederick Douglass in Rochester, New York to publish the North Star. In 1850, Delany was one of the first three black men admitted to Harvard Medical School, but all were dismissed after a few weeks because of widespread protests by white students. These experiences convinced Delany that black people had no future in the United States, leading him instead to the possibility of settling Black Americans in Africa. Although he visited Liberia, a United States colony founded by the American Colonization Society, and lived in Canada for several years, he returned to the United States when the American Civil War began. When the United States Colored Troops were created in 1863, he recruited for them. Commissioned as a major in February 1865, Delany became the first African American field grade officer in the United States Army.

After the Civil War, he settled in South Carolina, where he worked for the Freedmen's Bureau and became politically active, including in the Colored Conventions Movement. Delany ran unsuccessfully for Lieutenant Governor as an Independent Republican. He was appointed as a trial judge, but he was removed following a scandal. Delany later switched his party affiliation. He worked for the campaign of Democrat Wade Hampton III, who won the 1876 election for governor in a season marked by violent suppression of black Republican voters by Red Shirts and fraud in balloting.

== Early life and education ==
Delany was born free in Charles Town, Virginia (now Charles Town, West Virginia) to Pati and Samuel Delany. Although his father was enslaved, his mother was a free woman. Under Virginia's slave laws, children were considered born into the social status of their mothers (partus sequitur ventrem). All of Delany's grandparents had been born in Africa. His paternal grandparents were of Mandinka ethnicity (from modern-day Mali), taken captive during warfare and brought as slaves to the Virginia colony. Family oral history said that the grandfather was a chieftain, who had escaped to Canada for a period, and died resisting slavery's abuses.

His mother Pati's parents were born in the Niger Valley, West Africa, and were of Mandinka ethnicity. Her father was said to have been a prince named Yafaye, captured with his betrothed Fenda and brought to America as slaves. After some time, their enslaver released them from bondage in Virginia, perhaps based on their noble birth. Yafaye returned to Africa. Graci stayed in the colony with their only daughter Pati. When Delany was just a few years old, attempts were made to enslave him and a sibling. Their mother Pati carried her two youngest children 20 miles to the courthouse in Winchester to argue successfully for her family's freedom, based on her own free birth.

As he grew up, Delany and his siblings learned to read and write using The New York Primer and Spelling Book, given to them by a peddler. Virginia prohibited the education of Black people. When the book was discovered in September 1822, Pati moved with her children to nearby Chambersburg in the free state of Pennsylvania to ensure their continued freedom. They had to leave their father Samuel, but a year later he was allowed to buy his freedom and he rejoined his family in Chambersburg.

In Chambersburg, young Martin continued learning. Occasionally, he left school to work when his family could not afford for him to study. In Pennsylvania, Black children were only educated through the elementary grades, so Delany educated himself by reading. In 1831, at the age of 19, he journeyed west to the growing city of Pittsburgh, where he attended the Cellar School of the African Methodist Episcopal Church. He apprenticed with a white physician.

Delany and three other young black men were later accepted into Harvard Medical School, but they were forced to leave after white students protested. The whites reportedly petitioned the school to exclude applicants of color.

== Marriage and family ==
While living in Pittsburgh, in 1843, Delany met and married Catherine A. Richards. She was the daughter of a successful food provisioner, said to be one of the wealthiest families in the city. The couple had eleven children, seven of whom survived into adulthood. The parents stressed education, and some of their children graduated from college.

== Pittsburgh ==
Delany became involved with Trinity A.M.E. Church on Wylie Avenue, which had classes for adults. The church was part of the first independent black denomination in the United States, which was founded earlier in the 19th century in Philadelphia. Shortly after, he learned classics, Latin and Greek with Molliston M. Clark, who studied at Jefferson College. During the national cholera epidemic in 1832, Delany became apprenticed to Dr. Andrew N. McDowell, where he learned contemporary techniques of fire cupping and leeching, then considered the primary techniques to treat most diseases. He continued to study medicine under the mentorship of Dr. McDowell and other abolitionist doctors, such as Dr. F. Julius LeMoyne and Dr. Joseph P. Gazzam of Pittsburgh.

Delany became more active in political matters. In 1835, he attended his first National Negro Convention, held annually in Philadelphia since 1831. He was inspired to conceive a plan to set up a 'Black Israel' on the east coast of Africa.

In Pittsburgh, Delany played a central role in numerous civic and anti-slavery groups in the late 1830s and early 1840s. He engaged in temperance, literary, and moral reform societies that focused on working toward the advancement of African Americans. Delany also aided in constructing resistance to anti-black violence and discrimination in the city.

By 1843, Delany began publishing public works. Doing so by releasing, The Mystery, a Black-controlled newspaper. His articles and other writings were often reprinted in other venues, such as in abolitionist William Lloyd Garrison's The Liberator. A eulogy which Delany delivered for Rev. Fayette Davis in 1847 was widely redistributed. Delany often brought in metaphors and rhetoric from Freemasonry into his writings. His activities brought controversy in 1846, when he was sued for libel by "Fiddler" Johnson, a Black man he accused in The Mystery of being a slave catcher. Delany was convicted and fined $650 — a huge amount at the time. His white supporters in the newspaper business paid the fine for him.

While Frederick Douglass and William Lloyd Garrison were in Pittsburgh in 1847 on an anti-slavery tour, they met with Delany. In the same year, after a falling-out of sorts occurred between Douglass and The Liberator editor Garrison over the use of violence in the abolition cause and the concept of a strictly African-American-run newspaper, Delany with Douglass conceived of the newspaper developed as the North Star: to give voice to the stories of African Americans from their own accounts. They started publication later that year in Rochester, New York, where Douglass was based. Douglass handled the editing, printing, and publishing, while Delany traveled to lecture, report, and obtain subscriptions.

In July 1848, Delany reported in the North Star that U.S. District Court Justice John McLean had instructed the jury in the Crosswait trial to consider it a punishable offense for a citizen to thwart those trying to "repossess" an alleged runaway slave. His coverage influenced the abolitionist Salmon P. Chase to lead a successful drive to remove McLean as a candidate of the Free Soil Party for the Presidency later that summer.

== Medicine and nationalism ==
While living in Pittsburgh, Delany studied medicine under doctors. He founded his own practice in cupping and leeching. In 1849, he began to study more seriously to prepare to apply to medical school. In 1850, he was accepted into Harvard Medical School after presenting letters of support from seventeen physicians, although other schools had rejected his applications. Delany was one of the first three black men to be admitted there. However, the month after his arrival, a group of white students wrote to the faculty, complaining that "the admission of blacks to the medical lectures highly detrimental to the interests, and welfare of the Institution of which we are members". They cited that they had "no objection to the education and elevation of blacks but do decidedly remonstrate against their presence in College with us."

Within three weeks, Delany and his two fellow black students, Daniel Laing, Jr. and Isaac H. Snowden, were dismissed, despite many students and staff at the medical school supporting their being students. Furious, Delany returned to Pittsburgh. He became convinced that the white ruling class would not allow Black people to become leaders in society, and his opinions became more extreme. His book, The Condition, Elevation, Emigration, and Destiny of the Colored People of the United States, Politically Considered (1852), argued that black people had no future in the United States. He suggested they should leave and found a new nation elsewhere, perhaps in the West Indies or South America. More moderate abolitionists were alienated by his position. Some resented his criticizing men who failed to hire colored men in their own businesses. Martin Delany was also actively involved in the Prince Hall Freemasonry movement, which aligned with his efforts to promote civil rights and social progress for African Americans during the 19th century.

Delany worked for a brief period as principal of a colored school before going into practice as a physician. During a severe cholera outbreak in 1854, most doctors abandoned the city, as did many residents who could leave, since no one knew what caused the disease or how to control an epidemic. With a small group of nurses, Delany remained and cared for many of the ill.

Delany is rarely acknowledged in the historiography of African-American education. He is generally not included among African-American educators, perhaps because he neither featured prominently in the establishment of schools nor philosophized at length on Black education.

== Emigration ==
Having heard stories about his parents' ancestors, he wanted to visit Africa, which he considered his spiritual home.

In August 1854, Delany led the National Emigration Convention in Cleveland, Ohio, along with his friend James Monroe Whitfield, the abolitionist poet, and other black activists.

Delany advanced his emigrationist argument in his second manifesto, "Political Destiny of the Colored Race on the American Continent". The 1854 convention approved a resolution stating: "[A]s men and equals, we demand every political right, privilege and position to which the whites are eligible in the United States, and we will either attain to these, or accept nothing." A significant number of women attendees also voted for the resolution, considered the foundation of black nationalism.

In 1856, Delany moved his family to Chatham, Ontario, Canada, where they remained for nearly three years. In Chatham, he assisted in Underground Railroad activities, helping resettle American refugee slaves who had reached freedom in Canada. The same year, he was a member of the Chatham Vigilance Committee that sought to prevent former slaves from being returned to the United States and brought back into slavery, such as the case of Sylvanus Demarest.

In response to Harriet Beecher Stowe's anti-slavery novel Uncle Tom's Cabin (1852), in 1859 and 1862, Delany published parts of Blake; or the Huts of America: A Tale of the Mississippi Valley, the Southern United States, and Cuba in serialized form. His novel portrayed an insurrectionist's travels through slave communities. It highlights Cuba as the source of illegal international slave trade to the United States. He believed that Stowe had portrayed slaves as too passive, although he praised her highlighting the cruelty of Southern slave owners. Modern scholars have praised Delany's novel as an accurate expression of black culture. The first half of Part One was serialized in The Anglo-African Magazine, January to July 1859. The rest of Part One and Part Two was included in serial form in the Weekly Anglo African Magazine from 1861 to 1862. It was not published in book form until 1970 and the last chapters remain missing.

In May 1859, Delany sailed from New York for Liberia, to investigate the possibility of a new black nation in the region. The colony had been founded by the American Colonization Society to relocate free black people outside of the United States. He traveled for nine months and signed an agreement with eight indigenous chiefs in the Abeokuta region, in today's Nigeria, that would permit settlers to live on "unused land" in return for applying their skills for the community's good. It is a question whether Delany and the chiefs shared the same concepts of land use. The treaty was later dissolved due to warfare in the region, opposition by white missionaries, and the advent of the American Civil War.

In April 1860, Delany left Liberia for England. His presence at the International Statistical Congress in London in July of that year discomfited the American minister to Great Britain, former Vice-president George M. Dallas:

Toward the close of the session, Lord Brougham, seeing Mr. Dallas, the American Minister, present, said: 'I hope my friend Mr. Dallas will forgive me reminding him that there is a negro present, a member of the Congress.' (Loud laughter and vociferous cheering.) After the cheering had subsided, Mr. Dallas made no sign, but the negro in question, who happened to be Dr. Martin R. Delany, from Canada, rose, amid loud cheers, and said: 'I pray your Royal Highness will allow me to thank his lordship, who is always a most unflinching friend of the negro, for the observation he has made, and I assure your Royal Highness and his lordship that I am a man.' This novel and unexpected incident elicited a round of cheering very extraordinary for an assembly of sedate statisticians.

According to some sources, an abashed American delegate walked out in protest. As 1860 ended, Delany returned to the United States. The next year, he began planning settlement of Abeokuta, and gathered a group of potential settlers and funding. However, when Delany decided to remain in the United States to work for the emancipation of slaves, the pioneer plans fell apart.

== Union Army service ==
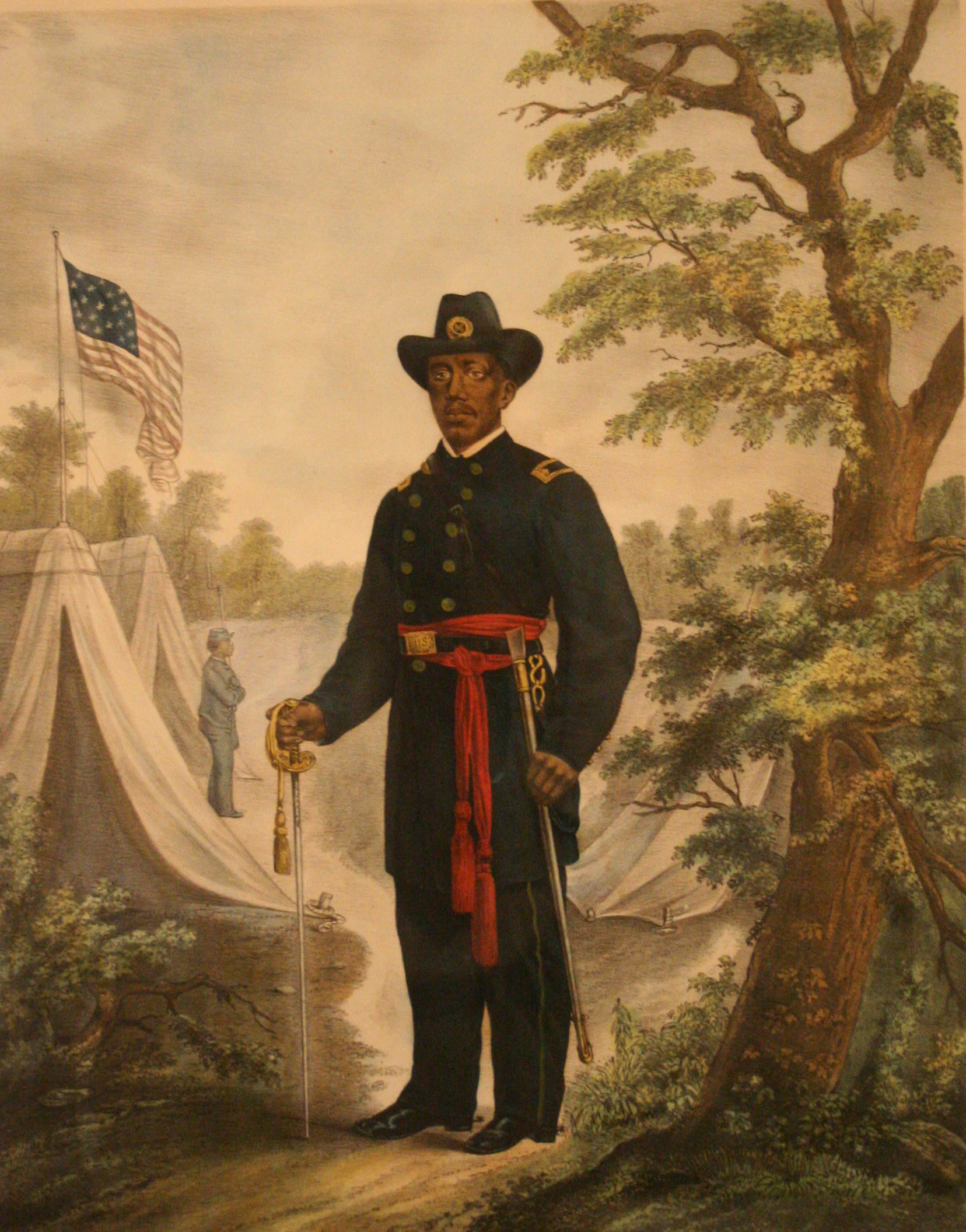
Martin R. Delany was the only black officer who received the rank of major during the Civil War.

In 1863, after Abraham Lincoln had called for a military draft, the 51-year-old Delany abandoned his dream of starting a new settlement on Africa's West Coast. Instead, he began recruiting black men for the Union Army. His efforts in Rhode Island, Connecticut, and later Ohio raised thousands of enlistees, many of whom joined the newly formed United States Colored Troops. His son Toussaint Louverture Delany (named after Toussaint Louverture a major leader of the Haitian Revolution) served with the 54th Regiment. The senior Delany wrote to the Secretary of War, Edwin M. Stanton, requesting that he make efforts "to command all of the effective black men as Agents of the United States", but the request was ignored. During the recruitment, 179,000 black men enlisted in the U.S. Colored Troops, almost 10 percent of all who served in the Union army.

In early 1865, Delany was granted an audience with Lincoln. He proposed a corps of black men led by black officers, who he believed could serve to (1) enforce the Emancipation Proclamation and (2) recruit newly freed black Southerners to the Union Army. Although the government had already rejected a similar appeal by Frederick Douglass, Lincoln was impressed by Delany and described him as "a most extraordinary and intelligent man" in a written memo to his Secretary of War Edwin Stanton. Delany was commissioned as a major in February 1865, becoming the first black field officer in the United States Army and achieving the highest rank an African-American field officer would reach during the Civil War. (The highest-ranking African-American officer of the Civil War, among those who received their commissions from the United States government, was Dr. Alexander Thomas Augusta, a medical officer who obtained the rank of Lt. Colonel by brevet.)

Delany especially wanted to lead colored troops into Charleston, South Carolina, the former secessionist hotbed. When Union forces captured the city, Major Delany was invited to the War Department ceremony in which Major General Robert Anderson would unfurl the very flag over Fort Sumter that he had been forced to lower four years earlier. Massachusetts Senator Henry Wilson and abolitionists William Lloyd Garrison and Henry Ward Beecher also participated in the ceremony. Major Delany had recruited black Charlestonians to restore the capacity of the 103rd and 104th regiments and start the 105th regiment of U.S. Colored Troops. He arrived at the ceremony with Robert Vesey, son of Denmark Vesey, who had been executed for starting a slave rebellion. The man came in the Planter, a ship piloted by the former slave Robert Smalls (who had taken it over during the war and driven the ship to Union lines, running the Confederate blockade outside Charleston Harbor).

The following day, the city learned that President Lincoln had been assassinated by John Wilkes Booth. Delany continued with the planned political rally for Charleston's freedmen, with Garrison and Senator Warner as speakers. He soon published an open letter to African Americans asking them to contribute to a memorial for "the Father of American Liberty". Two weeks later, Delany was scheduled to speak at another rally, before the visiting Chief Justice Salmon P. Chase. A journalist was surprised when Delany addressed the issue of ill-feelings between black freedmen and mulattos (or "browns", free people of color and mixed race) in Charleston. He said that two mulattos had informed authorities about Denmark Vesey's plans for a rebellion in 1822 conspiracy, rather than trying to promote racial healing and empowerment between the groups.

After the war, Delany initially remained with the Army and served under General Rufus Saxton in the 52nd U.S. Colored Troops. He was later transferred to the Freedmen's Bureau, serving on Hilton Head. Encountering Delany at a black church in South Carolina several weeks after the end of the Civil War, journalist Whitelaw Reid described him as "a coal-black negro, in the full uniform of a Major of the army, with an enormous regulation hat" and "no lack of flowing plume, or gilt cord and knots," who, while giving an ill-received speech, was noisily interrupted by the arrival of Salmon P. Chase, Chief Justice of the Supreme Court. Delany shocked white officers after the war by taking a strong position in supporting redistribution of land to freedmen. Later in 1865, Delany was mustered out of the Freedmen's Bureau and shortly afterward resigned from the Army.

== Later life ==
Following the war, Delany continued to be politically active. He established a land and brokerage business in 1871 and worked to help black cotton farmers improve their business and negotiating skills to get a better price for their product. He supported the Freedman's Bank (as did Douglass), and also traveled and spoke in support of the Colored Conventions Movement. Delany also argued against carpetbaggers and black candidates for office when he saw fit. For instance, he opposed the vice presidential candidacy of Jonathan Jasper Wright and John Mercer Langston on the grounds of inexperience, and he opposed the candidacy of another black man as Charleston's mayor.

Delany unsuccessfully sought various positions, such as appointment as Consul General to Liberia. In 1874, Delany ran as an Independent Republican for Lieutenant Governor of South Carolina (with John T. Green as the gubernatorial candidate). Despite the corruption scandals that enveloped former Republican governor Franklin Moses, Jr. (who chose not to run for re-election), their ticket lost to Republican Attorney General Daniel H. Chamberlain and his running mate Richard Howell Gleaves.

Delany was appointed as a trial justice (judge) in Charleston. In 1875, charges of "defrauding a church" were brought against him. After conviction, he was forced to resign and served time in jail. Although pardoned by Republican Governor Chamberlain, with the intervention of Wade Hampton, Delany was not allowed to return to his former position.

Delany supported Democratic candidate Wade Hampton in the 1876 gubernatorial election, the only prominent black person to do so. Partly as a result of black swing votes encouraged by Delany, Hampton won the election by fewer than 1,100 votes. However, the election was marred by white intimidation and violence against black Republicans in an effort to suppress the black vote. Armed men from "rifle clubs" and the Red Shirts operated openly. The latter was a paramilitary group of mostly white men who worked to suppress black voting as "the military arm of the Democratic Party." By 1876, South Carolina rifle clubs had about 20,000 white men as members. More than 150 black people were killed in election-related violence.

In early 1877, the federal government withdrew its troops from the South after the national election. This marked the end to Reconstruction, and Governor Chamberlain left the state. The Democrats, calling themselves Redeemers, had taken control of South Carolina's legislature. Paramilitary groups such as the Red Shirts continued to suppress black voting in the Carolinas, especially in the upland counties.

In reaction to whites regaining power and the suppression of black voting, black Charlestonians started planning again for emigration to Africa. In 1877, they formed the Liberia Exodus Joint Stock Steamship Company, with Delany as chairman of the finance committee. A year later, the company purchased a ship, the Azor, for the voyage led by Harrison N. Bouey. He served as president of the board to organize the voyage.

== Last years and death ==
In 1880, Delany withdrew from the project to serve his family. Two of his children were students at Wilberforce University in Ohio and required money for tuition fees. His wife had been working as a seamstress to make ends meet. Delany began practicing medicine again in Charleston. On January 24, 1885, he died of tuberculosis in Wilberforce, Ohio.

Delany is interred in a family plot at Massies Creek Cemetery in Cedarville, Ohio, next to his wife Catherine, who died July 11, 1894. For over 120 years, his family plot was only marked with a small government-issued tombstone on which his name was misspelled. Three of his children, Placido (died 1910), Faustin (died 1912) and Ethiopia (died 1920), were subsequently buried alongside their parents. Every grave except Martin's remained unmarked. In 2006, after many years of fundraising, The National Afro-American Museum and Cultural Center was able to raise $18,000 (~$26,866 in 2024) to have a monument built and placed at the grave site of Delany and his family. The monument is made of black granite from Africa and features an engraved picture of Delany in uniform during the war.

== Legacy and honors ==
According to historian Benjamin Quarles the most extraordinary characteristic about Delany:

was his deep-seated pride of race in his wide range of activities.... Delaney has been called 'the father of African nationalism,' a sobriquet reflecting his pride in his color and ancestry, his insistence that Negro Americans control their destiny, and his firm belief that Black Africa would one day regain its ancient glory.... By word and deed Delaney's pride in blackness and his emotional attachment to Africa struck a responsive vein in the hearts of many Negro Americans of his day and subsequently.

- In 1853, the abolitionist poet James Monroe Whitfield dedicated his book "America and other poems" to Delany.
- In 1991, the Pennsylvania Historical and Museum Commission installed a historical marker near 5 PPG Place in Pittsburgh, near to where Delany published 'The Mystery,^{Meaning unclear.} that commemorated Delany's historic importance. In 2003, Pennsylvania Historical and Museum Commission installed a second historical marker on Main Street in Chambersburg, noting Delany's historic importance.
- In 1999, Star Lodge #1 of the Prince Hall Masons erected a historical marker in Charles Town to honor Delany (adding an "n" to his middle name).
- In 2002, the scholar Molefi Kete Asante listed Delany as among the 100 Greatest African Americans.
- In 2017, the West Virginia Legislature passed a resolution to name the new bridge over the Shenandoah River carrying West Virginia Route 9 the "Major Martin Robison Delany Memorial Bridge"
- A mannequin of Delany greets visitors at the From Slavery to Freedom exhibit at the Heinz History Center in Pittsburgh, Pennsylvania.

== Works ==
See the bibliography,, West Virginia University Library.

- The Condition, Elevation, Emigration and Destiny of the Colored People of the United States, Politically Considered, (1852)
- The Origins and Objects of Ancient Freemasonry: Its Introduction into the United States and Legitimacy among Colored Men (1853)
- Political Destiny of the Colored Race on the American Continent in Proceedings of the National Emigration Convention of Colored People Held at Cleveland, Ohio the 24th, 25th and 26th of August, 1854 (1854)
- Introduction to William Nesbitt, Introduction to Four Months in Liberia (1855)
- Blake, or the Huts of America, (1859–62), Part I (the only part Delany published);
- Martin Robison Delany, Official Report of the Niger Valley Exploring Party (1861)
- University Pamphlets: A Series of Four Tracts on National Policy (1870)
- Principia of Ethnology: The Origin of Races and Color, with an Archaeological Compendium of Ethiopian and Egyptian Civilization (1879)
- Political Destiny of the Colored Race on the American Continent (1854)

== See also ==
- List of African-American abolitionists
- Thornton Chase, a white officer in the 104th USCI

== Bibliography ==
- Sterling, Dorothy (1996). The Making of an Afro-American: Martin Robison Delany 1812–1885. Da Capo Press. ISBN 978-0-306-80721-3.
