= Isaac H. Snowden =

African-American physician (1826–1869)

Isaac Humphrey Snowden (c. 1826–1869) was one of the first three African American students admitted to Harvard Medical School, in 1850, along with Martin Delany and Daniel Laing, Jr. Snowden and Laing were sponsored by the American Colonization Society in doing so and had previously been connected with the Young Men's Literary Society in Boston.

After being at Harvard for a time white students protested the admission of black students, and Snowden and the two other black students were removed from the school. Snowden then studied with a surgeon at Massachusetts General Hospital and unsuccessfully tried to re-enter Harvard in 1853.

In 1854, after completing his medical education, Snowden sailed for Liberia to serve in Sinou County. He died in Liberia in 1869.

== Sources ==
- Menand, Louis (2001), The Metaphysical Club: A Story of Ideas in America, New York: Farrar, Straus and Giroux, pp. 7–9, ISBN 0374528497.
- A Study of Black Intellectual and Literary Societies in Antebellum Boston
