= Fairplay (organization) =

U.S. nonprofit organization

- Formation: 2000; 26 years ago
- Headquarters: Boston, Massachusetts
- Board Chair: Criscillia Benford
- Website: fairplayforkids.org

Fairplay, previously known as Campaign for a Commercial-Free Childhood (CCFC), is an American organization advocating for anti-commercialism as it related to children.

== History ==
The group was cofounded by Susan Linn and Alvin Poussaint in 2000.

=== FTC Baby Einstein complaint ===
In May 2006, the CCFC filed a complaint with the U.S. Federal Trade Commission (FTC) against the Baby Einstein Company and the Brainy Baby Company, a producer of similar videos; the following month the CCFC amended the complaint to include another producer, BabyFirstTV. The CCFC alleged false advertising by these companies, citing the American Academy of Pediatrics' recommendation that children under two should be discouraged from watching television programming at all, and a study showing that only six percent of parents are aware of that recommendation, while forty-nine percent of parents think educational videos like these are very important in the intellectual development of children.

In December 2007, the FTC closed the complaint, determining not to recommend any enforcement action against the company. In so doing, the FTC noted that certain of the claims that were the subject of the CCFC’s complaint did not raise issues under the FTC’s substantiation rules.

=== Fairplay ===
In 2021, CCFC rebranded as Fairplay. It sponsors the annual Fred Rogers Integrity Award and the TOADY Award. CCFC concerns include catalogs for children that might be inappropriate and child privacy rights. The group describes itself as a:

"National coalition of health care professionals, educators, advocacy groups, parents, and individuals who care about children [and is] the only national organization devoted to limiting the impact of commercial culture on children."
