= Daniel Laing Jr. =

American physician

Daniel Laing Jr. (1824–1869) was an American medical doctor who practiced in the United States and Liberia. He was one of the first African American physicians in the United States.

== Biography ==
Laing was born a free black in Boston. He tried to make a living as an independent printer before deciding to emigrate to Liberia. The American Colonization Society, which advocated settling America's free blacks in Liberia, convinced Laing that he should study medicine because Liberia needed doctors more than printers. Laing and another free black, Isaac H. Snowden, then studied under Horace Clarke, a surgeon at Massachusetts General Hospital. They both applied for admission to Harvard Medical School in 1850, on the sponsorship of the Society and under the promise that they would emigrate to Liberia after earning their degrees. A third free black, Martin Delany, also applied separately.

The Harvard faculty voted to admit all three, and Laing, Snowden and Delany attended during the 1850-51 winter semester. A majority of the school's students protested their admission and petitioned for their removal, with many students threatening to transfer. The faculty eventually bowed to the students' pressure, so Laing and the other blacks were expelled.

Laing subsequently left the U.S. to study for two years under the French surgeon Alfred-Armand-Louis-Marie Velpeau in Paris. He returned to finish his education at Dartmouth Medical School, receiving his medical degree in 1854. Laing became a specialist on remittent fever and moved with his wife, Anna Bicknell Parker, to Liberia, where he spent the next decade working as a physician for the American Colonization Society. His son Joseph was born in Monrovia, Liberia in 1860; Laing also had a daughter, Mary. Laing contracted a fever in the mid-1860s, and moved his family to Charleston, South Carolina, where he died in 1869. His family would later claim that he was poisoned at a banquet held in his honor, by whites who opposed his plan to open a medical clinic for blacks. After her husband's death, Anna moved her children to Providence, Rhode Island. Mary died there in 1880.

His son Joseph married and had four children. His daughter, Ada, eloped in 1914 with Fritz Pollard, to whom Joseph had rented a room the year before. Pollard later became one of the first African American players in the NFL, and the first African American head coach.
