= Alvin Francis Poussaint =

American psychiatrist (1934–2025)

- Born: May 15, 1934; New York City, U.S.
- Died: February 24, 2025 (aged 90); Chestnut Hill, Massachusetts, U.S.
- Education: Columbia University; Cornell University
- Known for: The Cosby Show consultant
- Spouse: Tina Young Poussaint
- Scientific career
- Fields: Psychiatry
- Workplaces: Harvard Medical School

Alvin Francis Poussaint (May 15, 1934 – February 24, 2025) was an American psychiatrist known for his research on the effects of racism in the black community. He was a noted author, public speaker, and television consultant, and dean of students at Harvard Medical School. His work in psychiatry was influenced greatly by the civil rights movement in the South, which he joined in 1965.

While living in the South, Poussaint learned much about American racial dynamics. He soon delved into his first book, Why Blacks Kill Blacks (1972), which looks at the effects of racism on the psychological development of blacks. Most of Poussaint's work focuses on the mental health of African Americans.

== Biography ==
Alvin Francis Poussaint was born on May 15, 1934, in East Harlem, New York, to immigrants from Haiti. He was the seventh of eight children born to Harriet and Christopher Poussaint. The family was Catholic.

At the age of eight, he became ill with rheumatic fever. While hospitalized, he became very interested in reading and it soon became a passion of his. Poussaint attended the prestigious Stuyvesant High School, at the time a predominately white institution, where Pouissant was one of the few blacks and encountered racism often. In addition to racist acts against him, he had to deal with losing his mother during high school.

After graduating from Stuyvesant, Poussaint attended Columbia University, where he continued to experience racism. At Columbia, the social scene was particularly disappointing for Poussaint.

“Social situations were awkward, there being a prevalent feeling among whites that blacks shouldn't come to social events,” he said.

In 1956, he graduated from Columbia with a bachelor's degree in pharmacology. He immediately enrolled in medical school at Cornell Medical School, and he was the only African American admitted during that year. Experiences with racism fueled his career areas of work, which focused on the mental health of African Americans and their encounters with racial bias. He received his Doctor of Medicine degree in 1960.

Poussaint later became chief resident at the UCLA Neuropsychiatric Institute. However, in 1965 he left UCLA to become the Southern Field Director of the Medical Committee for Human Rights in Jackson, Mississippi. Poussaint believed that racism was the major mental health problem of the black community. He believed helping desegregate the South, especially with medical facilities would be more helpful than doing research at the time.

He stayed in Mississippi for two years before going to Tufts University Medical program, where he was the faculty director of psychiatry. In 1969, he left Tufts and began his longtime journey at Harvard Medical School, where he was the associate dean of student affairs. At Harvard, he felt a great passion for the affirmative action program, through which he helped 16 African-American students succeed at the university. During his tenure at Harvard, Poussaint never let his passion for the Civil Rights Movement fade. He became close friends with Jesse Jackson and was the co-chairman for Jesse Jackson's presidential campaign.

In the 1980s, Poussaint became very well known for his work as a media consultant on scripts and storylines for many black sitcoms, such as The Cosby Show and A Different World. He became close friends with Bill Cosby to ensure that the show promoted a positive healthy and realistic image of black families.

The entertainment industrial complex was not the only sector that called for Poussaint and his skills. The FBI, the White House, and the Department of Health all summoned him for counsel. He continued his interest in media and founded the Media Center of the Judge Baker's Children's Center in 1994. In addition, Poussaint was the co-executive producer of Willoughby's Wonders. The children's show won a New England Emmy Award in 1997 and was praised for portraying an urban soccer team that showed skills that children should exhibit, such as teamwork and inclusion.

Poussaint continued to work at Harvard Medical School and conducting research. On multiple occasions, he was awarded for his contributions to psychology and a multitude of disciplines. In 2000 he cofounded the Campaign for a Commercial-Free Childhood with Susan Linn.

Poussaint died at his Chestnut Hill, Massachusetts home on February 24, 2025, at the age of 90.

== Personal life ==
In 1973, Poussaint married his first wife, Anne Ashmore. They had one son together. Their marriage lasted until 1988. In 1992, Poussaint married Tina Young, the two had a daughter in 1999.

== Thought ==
Alvin F. Poussaint was well known in psychology regarding race relations. Much of his work deconstructs theories of race models by white psychologists previously in the field. Through his research he addresses blatant and subtle forms of racism. This was why Poussaint insisted that blacks instill self-esteem and black pride into children growing up in this society. In his controversial book, Why Blacks Kill Blacks, he turns the theory of racial self-hatred on its head. He developed his "aggression-rage" theory to show the psychological issues that may plague African Americans. In his book he states, " [The theory of racial self-hatred] allows whites to feel that [blacks] are psychologically deranged while [whites are] posing as models of mental health. In fact, it must be whites who are insecure and filled with self-hatred, since they are the ones who need to oppress blacks in order to cope with life." Another interest of Poussaint was media consulting, using media to construct positive role models for children.

== Notable articles ==
=== "Black Power: A Failure for Integration within the Civil Rights Movement" (1968) ===
In Alvin Poussaint's article, "Black Power: A Failure for Integration within the Civil Rights Movement" he discusses how the concept of BLACK POWER emerged. Poussaint discusses how Blacks had a complicated relationship with Whites regarding Whites trying to integrate themselves in the Civil Rights Movement. He argues that blacks had a distrust in whites and even had jealousy of them. He observed that Blacks believed Whites had a superiority complex even while being involved in the movement. Poussaint questioned whether this was because Blacks felt inadequate. During the civil rights movement sexual relations between Blacks and White began to form, and so he says from 1964 to 1965 many of the projects "disintegrated" because of these feelings each race had towards one another. Eventually, BLACK POWER came to be as a "psycho-socio-political" concept that removed whites from working in the black community.

=== "The Stresses of the White Female Worker in the Civil Rights Movement in the South" (1966) ===
While working as the Southern Field Director of the Medical Committee for Human Rights in Jackson, Mississippi, Poussaint was very observant of those around him. In his article, "The Stresses of the White Female Worker in the Civil Rights Movement in the South" he looks at the social and psychological stressors that white women could possibly encounter in their work and social life during the Civil Rights Movement. The stress that white women could encounter come from two fronts - the white community and the blacks whom they work around. Poussaint describes how white women helping in the civil rights movements appears like a rejection that they have of their own communities. So, white communities may label them as "white trash". The black community did not want white female workers to help in the first place because they believed their presence would cause inherent problems. Many white women were not greeted or welcomed by most blacks there because they did not want whites taking over their movement. Some white female workers coped with this, but a majority went back home because they couldn't handle the stress.

== Editorial boards ==
- The Black Scholar (1970)
- Psychotherapy: Theory and Research and Practice (1972)
- Journal of Afro-American Issues (1972–1980)
- Harvard Medical School Mental Health Newsletter (1983–1988)
- Journal of African American Male Studies (1991)
- Nurture: The Magazine for Raising Positive Children of Color (1994)

== Awards and honors ==
- Doctor of Humane Letters, Virginia State University, Petersburg, MA (2007)
- Doctor of Humane Letters, Alfred University, Alfred, New York (2005)
- New England Emmy award for Outstanding Children's Special as co-executive producer of Willoughby's Wonders (1997)
- Medgar Evers Medal of Honor, Johnson Publishing Company (1988)
- John Jay Award for distinguished professional achievement (1987)
- American Black Achievement Award in Business and the Professions (1986)
- Honorary degree from Wilberforce University (1972)
- Who's Who in America (1969)
- Michael Schwerner Award for contribution to Cause of Civil Rights, New York, NY (1968)

== Publications ==
=== Books ===
- Why Blacks kill Blacks (1972), (introduction by Rev. Jesse Jackson) Emerson Hall Publishers, Inc.; 1st edition
- Introduction and Afterword to "Fatherhood", by Bill Cosby, Dolphin: New York, 1986
- Raising Black Children (originally titled Black Child Care, 1975), co-author with James P. Comer, Plume: New York, 1992
- Lay My Burden Down: Suicide and the mental health crisis among African-Americans, by Alvin F. Poussaint, MD and Amy Alexander, Beacon: Boston, 2000.
- Come On, People: On the path from victims to victors, by Bill Cosby and Alvin F. Poussaint, MD, Thomas Nelson: Nashville, 2007.

=== Articles ===
- "Clinical Manifestations and Diagnosis of Amyloid Polyneuropathy" by T. L. Munsat and A. F. Poussaint (Neurology, Minneapolis, 1962; 12(6):413–422)
- "A Controlled Study of Imipramine (Tofranil) in the Treatment of Childhood Enuresis" by A. F. Poussaint and K. S. Ditman (J Pediatry, 1965; 67(6):283–290)
- "The Effect of the Physician's Smoking on the Treatment of Smokers" by A. F. Poussaint, S. H. Bergman, and E. Lichtenstein (Diseases of the Nervous System, 1966; 27:539–543.)
- "The Stresses of the White Female Worker in the Civil Rights Movement in the South" (Am J Psychiatry, 1966; 123(4):401–407)
- "A Negro Psychiatrist Explains the Negro Psyche" by The New York Times Sunday Magazine, August 20, 1967:52+
- "Black Power: A Failure for Integration within the Civil Rights Movement", A. F. Poussaint and J. Ladner (Arch Gen Psychiatry, 1968; 18(4):385–391)
- "The Black Administrator in the White University (Black Scholar, September 1974:8–14)
- "Black Suicide (Textbook of Black-Related Diseases", ed. R. A. Williams, New York: McGraw-Hill, 1975)
- "Interracial Relations and Prejudice" (Comprehensive Textbook of Psychiatry/III, third edition, eds H. I. Kaplan, A. M. Freedman and B. J. Sadock, Baltimore: Williams & Wilkins, 1980:3155–3161)
- "Black on Black Homicide: A Psychological-Political Perspective" (International J Victimology, 1983; 8(3,4):161–169)
- "An Honest Look at Blacks Gays and Lesbians" (Ebony, September 1990:124–131)
- "Black Children: Coping in a Racist Society" (Voices of Multicultural America: Notable Speeches Delivered by African, Asian, Hispanic and Native Americans, 1790–1995, ed. Deborah Gillan Straub, Detroit: Gale Research, 1996)
- "Psychology and Psychiatry" (Encyclopedia of African-American Culture and History, vol. 4, eds Deborah Gillan Straub, J. Salzman, D. L. Smith, C. West New York: MacMillan Library Reference USA, 1996)
- "Sexuality" (eds J. Salzman, D. L. Smith, C. West, Encyclopedia of African-American Culture and History, vol. 5, New York: MacMillan Library Reference USA, 1996)
- "Prostate Cancer: Male Killer Hits Famous & Not-So-Famous" (Ebony, April 1997, 116–120+)
- "Racial Issues in Medicine: A Psychosocial Perspective" (Humane Medicine: A New Paradigm in Medical Education and Health Care Delivery, vol. II, ed. R. A. Williams, Philadelphia: Lippincott Williams & Wilkins Healthcare, 2001; 33–40)
- "Is Extreme Racism a Mental Illness? Point-Counterpoint" (Western Journal of Medicine, 2002; 176: 4)
