= Valerie E. Stone =

American physician

Valerie Stone
- Born: Valerie Ellen Stone; 1958 (age 67–68)
- Education: Yale University; Harvard University
- Scientific career
- Fields: Medicine; HIV/AIDS
- Workplaces: Case Western Reserve University; Brigham and Women's Hospital; Brown University; Massachusetts General Hospital; Mount Auburn Hospital
- Website: connects.catalyst.harvard.edu/Profiles/display/Person/86687

Valerie Ellen Stone (born 1958) is an American physician who is a professor of medicine at the Harvard Medical School. She served for many years as Vice Chair for Diversity, Equity, and Inclusion, Department of Medicine, Brigham and Women's Hospital and now serves as a faculty development leader in the department and the Cynthia and John F. Fish Endowed Chairin Medical Education. She specializes in the management of HIV/AIDS, health disparities and improving the quality of medical education.

== Early life and education ==
Stone is from Montclair, New Jersey. Stone has said that her early life inspired her career in medicine. As a child she lost her grandmother to metastatic cancer, and as an undergraduate student she lost a cousin to pneumonia caused by HIV/AIDS. Stone was already a successful science student at high school, and decided that she would eventually pursue a degree in medicine. As an undergraduate Stone studied chemical engineering, but whilst she enjoyed the science; she missed the interaction with members of society. Motivated by her grandmother, Stone became focused on women's health. She completed her medical education at the Yale University School of Medicine. She worked as a DJ throughout her studies and lived in the Harkness dorm. Whilst she was studying medicine, she saw members of her family, classmates and friends get infected with HIV. She has called AIDS the "defining disease of [her] generation". After graduating in 1984, Stone initially began residency in obstetrics and gynecology, but after internship, switched to internal medicine and completed medicine residency at Case Western Reserve University. As a medical resident, Stone joined the American College of Physicians, and she was board certified in 1988. She earned a Master of Public Health at the Harvard T.H. Chan School of Public Health. She later completed a fellowship in infectious diseases at the Boston City Hospital. Her first job was at Boston City Hospital, where she directed ambulatory care services.

== Research and career ==
After completing her training, Stone was appointed to the faculty at Harvard University. At the beginning of Stone's career medicine there were limited treatment pathways for patients with HIV/AIDS. She treated her first HIV/AIDS patient in 1983. In 1996, things dramatically changed, when highly active antiretroviral therapy (HAART) made it possible to manage AIDS like other chronic illnesses. Her research focused on why HIV/AIDS was so prevalent amongst Black communities, and how to optimize the care of patients from underserved communities. Whilst working at Harvard, Stone was an active primary care physician and a senior scientist at the Stoeckle Center for Primary Care Innovation at the Massachusetts General Hospital. She was appointed a full Professor of Medicine at Harvard in 2011, becoming the first African American womanProfessor of Medicine and only the second African American woman Professor in Harvard Medical School history. In 2014, Stone was made Chair of the Department of Medicine at Mount Auburn Hospital, and was named the Charles S. Davidson Professor of Medicine at Harvard Medical School. She moved to the Brigham and Women's Hospital in 2019, where she was made the Vice Chair for Diversity, Equity, and Inclusion, while continuing her role at Harvard Medical School. Here she also serves on the faculty of the women's leadership program.

Throughout the COVID-19 pandemic, Stone used social media to discuss the disproportionate impact of SARS-CoV-2 on communities of colour. In the aftermath of the murder of George Floyd, Stone wrote to the faculty of Harvard Medical School to describe the anguish that she felt.

=== Academic service ===
Stone was appointed a Fellow of the American College of Physicians in 1996. From 2001 to 2014 Stone directed the primary care residency program at Massachusetts General Hospital, and used the opportunity to transform the curriculum. As part of this effort Stone created training programs in cross-cultural care, health policy and women's health. She was elected to the American College of Physicians Board of Regents in 2008, and held this position for over 6 years. From 2012 to 2014 she served as Chair of the Education and Publications committee. She serves on the advisory board of the Fenway Institute National LGBT Health Education Alliance.

=== Awards and honors ===
Her awards and honors include:

- 1996 Fellow of the American College of Physicians
- 2012 Society of General Internal Medicine Elnora Rhodes Award
- 2017 Action for Boston Community Development Hero Award
- 2018 Massachusetts Chapter Laureate Award
- 2020 American College of Physicians W. Lester Henry Award for Diversity and Access to Care
- Justice in Health Award from Justice Resource Institute Health

=== Selected publications ===
Her publications include:

- Aberg, Judith A.; Kaplan, Jonathan E.; Libman, Howard; Emmanuel, Patricia; Anderson, Jean R.; Stone, Valerie E.; Oleske, James M.; Currier, Judith S.; Gallant, Joel E. (September 1, 2009). "Primary Care Guidelines for the Management of Persons Infected with Human Immunodeficiency Virus: 2009 Update by the HIV Medicine Association of the Infectious Diseases Society of America". Clinical Infectious Diseases. 49 (5): 651–681. doi:10.1086/605292. ISSN 1058-4838. PMID 19640227. S2CID 1173425.
- Mayer, Kenneth H.; Stone, Valerie E. (September 15, 2001). "Strategies for Optimizing Adherence to Highly Active Antiretroviral Therapy: Lessons from Research and Clinical Practice". Clinical Infectious Diseases. 33 (6): 865–872. doi:10.1086/322698. ISSN 1058-4838. PMID 11512092.
- Stone, Valerie; Ojikutu, Bisola; Rawlings, M. Keith; Smith, Kimberly Y., eds. (2009). HIV/AIDS in U.S. Communities of Color. New York: Springer-Verlag. ISBN 978-0-387-98151-2.
- Washington, Donna L.; Bowles, Jacqueline; Saha, Somnath; Horowitz, Carol R.; Moody-Ayers, Sandra; Brown, Arleen F.; Stone, Valerie E.; Cooper, Lisa A.; Writing group for the Society of General Internal Medicine, Disparities in Health Task Force (2008-01-15). "Transforming Clinical Practice to Eliminate Racial-Ethnic Disparities in Healthcare." Journal of General Internal Medicine. 23 (5): 685–691. doi:10.1007/s11606-007-0481-0 ISSN 0884-8734

== Personal life ==
Stone is married to Kathryn T. Hall who is the Chief Public Health Officer of the City of Cambridge and on faculty at the Harvard Medical School. They have one daughter who works in healthcare management.
