= Paul Vincent Davis (puppeteer) =

American puppeteer (1935–2025)

- Born: January 5, 1935; Richmond, Virginia, U.S.
- Died: August 4, 2025 (aged 90); West Roxbury, Boston, Massachusetts, U.S.
- Occupations: Puppeteer, director, teacher
- Known for: Artist in Residence, Puppet Showplace Theater
- Awards: 5× UNIMA-USA Citation of Excellence

Paul Vincent Davis (January 5, 1935 – August 4, 2025) was an American puppeteer, director, and teacher whose career spanned more than five decades. Renowned for his clarity of performance and storytelling and his excellence in glove-puppet technique, he served for over 30 years as Artist in Residence at Puppet Showplace Theater in Brookline, Massachusetts. He created more than a dozen full-length productions, and was recognized with five UNIMA-USA Citations of Excellence—the highest national puppetry award—as well as the Puppeteers of America President’s Award. A retrospective exhibition at the Ballard Institute and Museum of Puppetry described him as “one of the United States’s most dynamic 20th-century puppeteers.” As a mentor and teacher, he trained new generations of puppeteers—most notably Brad Shur—whose work continued Davis’s legacy on the New England stage.

== Early life and education ==
Davis was born in Richmond, Virginia, in 1935 and raised in Alexandria. His fascination with puppets began at age four, performing with hand puppets for family and neighbors. At age ten, he watched performances by Frank Paris’ Marionettes and an Italian troupe in Washington, D.C., inspiring him to build a small puppet theater in his family’s garage with his father. Later, he earned a Bachelor of Fine Arts from the Richmond Professional Institute of the College of William & Mary.

== Career ==
=== Early work ===
In the early 1960s, Davis worked in art studios, print shops, and as an art director at a New York ad agency, before moving into freelance graphic design and part-time puppetry. He also performed as an actor and folk singer. Davis’s early puppetry focused on serious pieces for adults—Samuel Beckett adaptations, Japanese folk dramas, and medieval miracle plays—commissioned by groups like the Repertory Puppet Theater of Washington, D.C. In the early 1970s, he co-directed the National Theater of Puppet Arts in New York with Carol Fijan, creating puppetry adaptations of Shakespeare and Greek classics.

=== Puppet Showplace Theater ===
Around 1978, Davis became Artist in Residence at Puppet Showplace Theater in Brookline, moving with Mary Churchill (puppeteer) to establish the institution as a regional puppetry home. He was known for his glove-puppet design—jointed limbs operated via dramatic wrist movement yielding exceptionally lifelike motion. Over three decades, Davis created and performed more than a dozen full-length productions, including Androcles and the Lion, The Singing Turtle, Raccoon Tales, Rumpelstiltskin, Bingo the Circus Dog, Jo Jo and the Orange Ball, Chinese Dragon Dance, and Here Come the Clowns.

Among his most lauded works, he received UNIMA-USA Citations of Excellence for The Leprechaun of Donegal (1980), The Golden Axe (1982), Three Festival Dances (1982), Beauty and the Beast (1984), and Fables of Ancient Rome (1988). In 1990, the Puppeteers of America awarded him its President’s Award for his outstanding career contributions to puppetry. In 1997, he became executive director of Puppet Showplace Theater, and after retiring as a performer in 2007, he continued to teach as Resident Artist Emeritus.

=== Later recognition ===
In 2014, Puppet Showplace Theater created the Paul Vincent Davis Award in his honor to recognize artistic excellence. In 2020, the Ballard Institute and Museum of Puppetry commemorated Davis with a major retrospective exhibition showcasing his puppets, sets, and storytelling legacy. In 2021, he received the National Capital Puppetry Guild’s Lifetime Achievement Award, complete with commendations from Governor Charlie Baker and First Lady Jill Biden. In 2023, UNIMA-USA honored him with a Special Citation, calling him “an Artist par Excellence of American Puppetry.”

== Personal life ==
In 1976, at an international puppetry conference in Moscow, Davis met Mary Churchill, who became his artistic partner and lifelong companion. Churchill died in 1997. Davis died at his home in West Roxbury on August 4, 2025, at age 90.

== Legacy ==
Davis is a glove puppetry performer and designer. He has contributed to the Boston puppetry community and the American puppet theater through his creative work and mentorship.
