= Harvard Medical School =

Medical school in Boston, Massachusetts, US

- Coat of arms
- Type: Private medical school
- Established: September 19, 1782; 244 years ago
- Parent institution: Harvard University
- Dean: George Q. Daley
- Faculty: 11,694
- Students: Totals: MD – 712; PhD – 915; DMD – 140; Master's – 269; DMSc – 39
- Location: Boston, Massachusetts, United States; 42°20′13″N 71°06′14″W
- Website: hms.harvard.edu

Harvard Medical School (HMS) is the medical school of Harvard University. It is located in the Longwood Medical Area in Boston, Massachusetts. Founded in 1782, HMS is the third oldest medical school in the United States. It provides patient care, medical education, and research training through its 15 clinical affiliates and research institutes, including Massachusetts General Hospital (MGH), Boston Children's Hospital, Dana–Farber Cancer Institute, Brigham and Women's Hospital, Beth Israel Deaconess Medical Center and others.

Beginning in the early 2000s, HMS faculty have faced numerous controversies regarding research fabrication and falsifying research images, resulting in a number of retracted articles. In December 2018, George Daley, dean of HMS, was forced to retract a Nature Cell Biology paper as a result of his lab falsifying data.

In December 2025, HMS morgue manager Cedric Lodge was sentenced for trafficking and selling human remains, resulting in a $53 million settlement from HMS.

== History ==
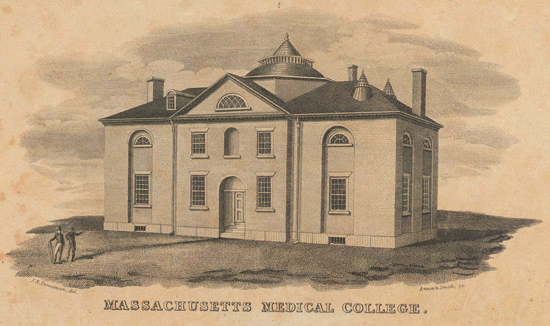
Massachusetts Medical College on Mason Street

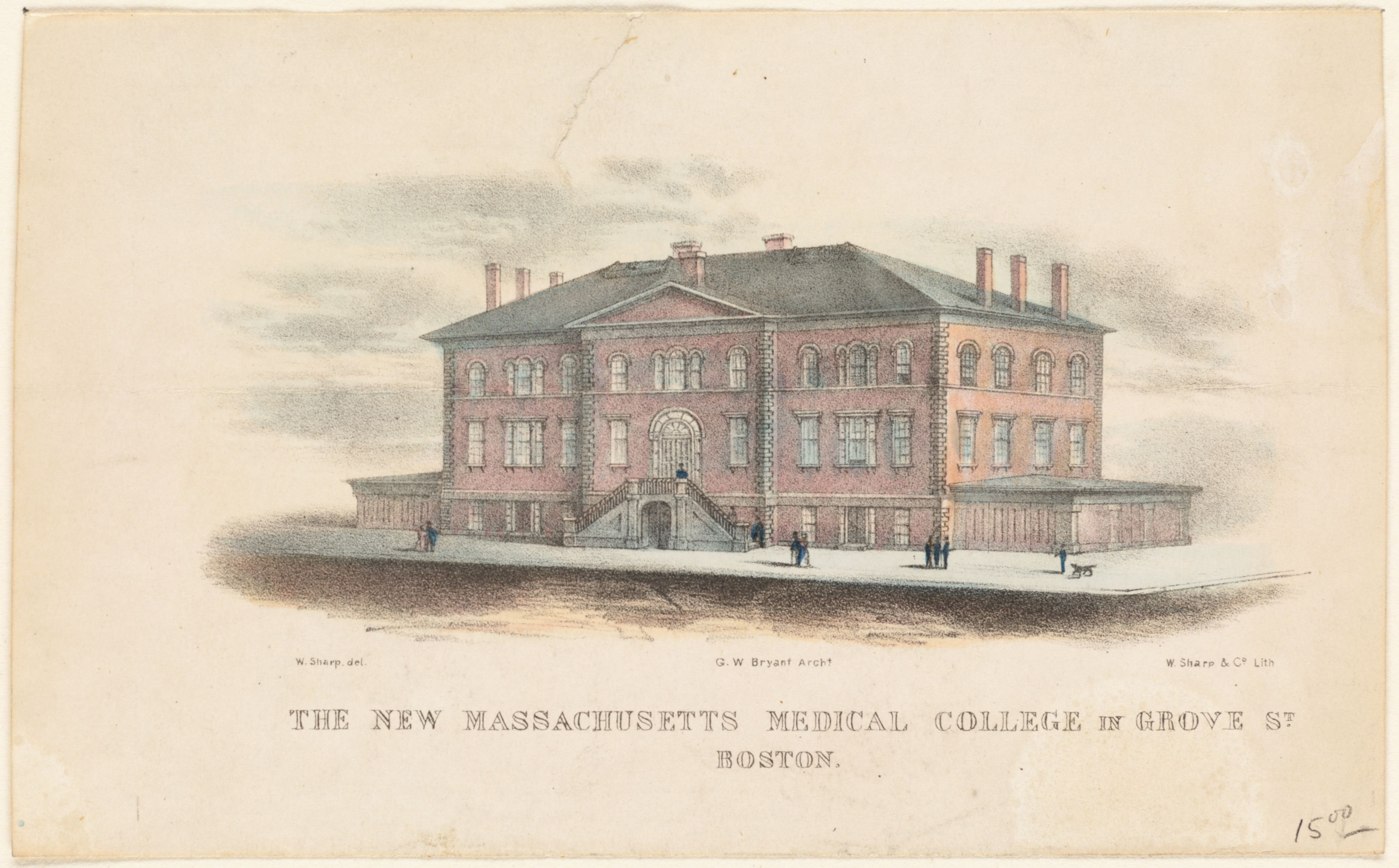
Massachusetts Medical College on Grove Street in Boston

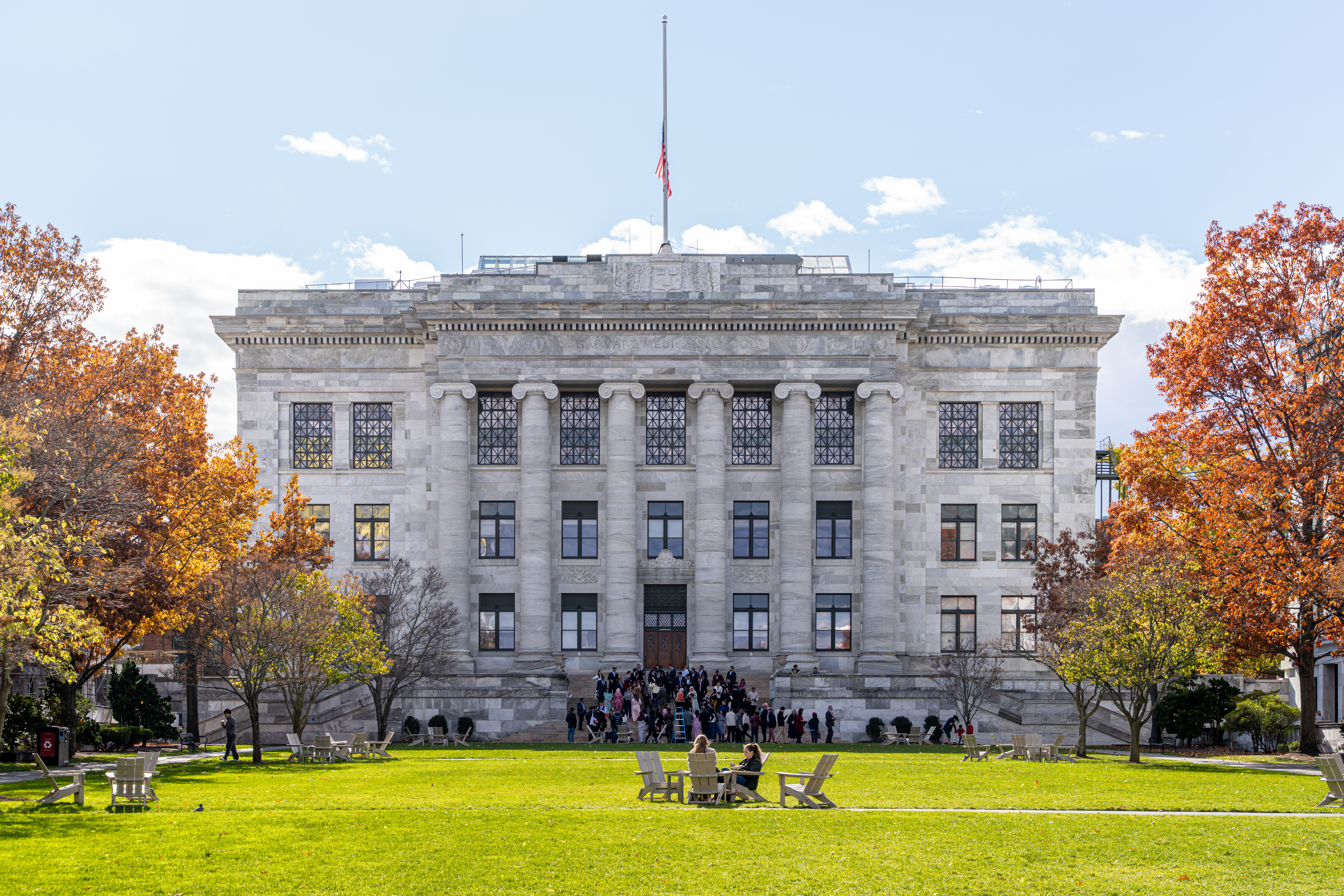
The Harvard Medical School quadrangle in the Longwood Medical and Academic Area in Boston (2025)

Harvard Medical School was founded on September 19, 1782, on the initiative of Harvard president Joseph Willard. The founding faculty were John Warren, Aaron Dexter, and Benjamin Waterhouse. It is the third-oldest medical school in the United States, after the Perelman School of Medicine at the University of Pennsylvania and Columbia University College of Physicians and Surgeons.

Lectures were first held in the basement of Harvard Hall, then in Holden Chapel. Students paid no tuition but purchased tickets to five or six daily lectures. The first two students graduated in 1788.

In the following century, the school moved locations several times due to changing clinical relationships, a function of the fact that Harvard Medical School does not directly own or operate a teaching hospital. In 1810, the school moved to Boston at what is now downtown Washington Street. In 1816, the school was moved to Mason Street and was called the Massachusetts Medical College of Harvard University in recognition of a gift from the Great and General Court of Massachusetts. In 1847, the school was moved to Grove Street to be closer to Massachusetts General Hospital. In 1883, the school was relocated to Copley Square. Before this move, Charles William Eliot became Harvard's president in 1869, and found the medical school in the worst condition of any part of the university. He instituted drastic reforms that raised admissions standards, instituted a formal degree program, and defined HMS as a professional school within Harvard University that laid the groundwork for its transformation into one of the leading medical schools in the world.

In 1906, the school moved to its present location in the Longwood Medical and Academic Area.

=== Innovations ===
Harvard Medical School postdoctoral trainees and faculty have been associated with several important medical and public health innovations:

- Introduction of smallpox vaccination to America
- Introduction of insulin to the US to treat diabetes
- Comprehending of the role of vitamin B12 in treating anemia
- Identification of coenzyme A and understanding of proteins
- Developing tissue culture methods for the polio virus, which paved the way for vaccines against polio
- Mapping the visual system of the brain
- Development of the first successful chemotherapy for childhood leukemia
- Development of the first implantable cardiac pacemaker
- Discovering the inheritance of immunity to infection
- Development of artificial skin for burn victims
- First successful heart valve surgery (at Peter Bent Brigham Hospital, 1923)
- First successful human kidney transplant
- First reattachment of a severed human limb
- Discovery of the genes that cause Duchenne muscular dystrophy, Huntington's disease, amyotrophic lateral sclerosis (Lou Gehrig's disease), and Alzheimer's disease, among many others
- Establishing the importance of tumor vascular supply (angiogenesis) and seeding vascular biology

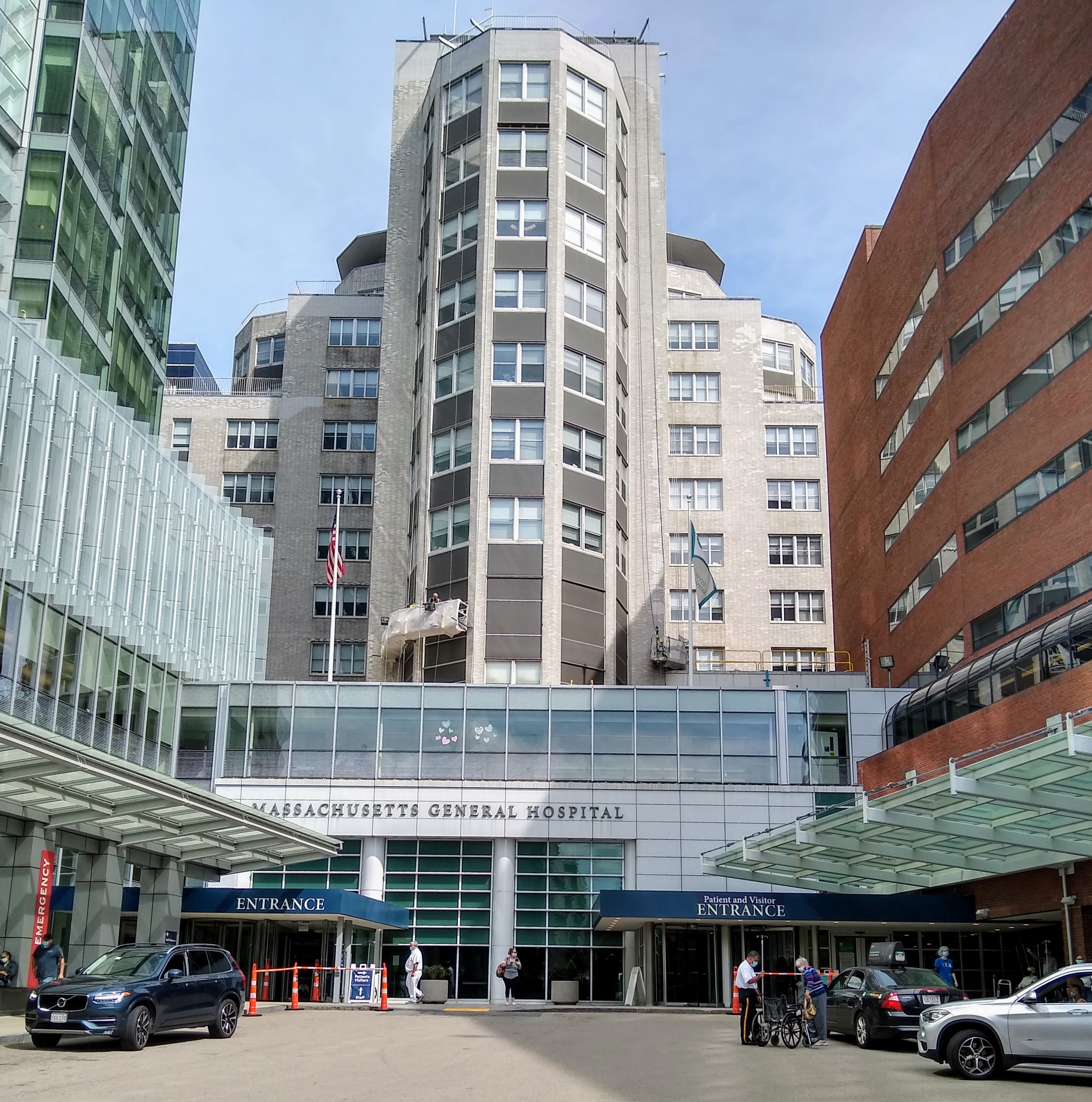
Front entrance of Massachusetts General Hospital, the original and largest teaching hospital of Harvard Medical School

=== Broadening admissions ===
==== Women ====
In mid-1847, professor Walter Channing's proposal that women be admitted to lectures and examinations was rejected by the President and Fellows of Harvard College. That year Harriot Hunt became the first woman to apply to Harvard Medical School. Dr. Oliver Wendell Holmes Sr. had recently been made Dean of the school and initially considered accepting her application. He was heavily criticized by the all-male student body as well as the university overseers and other faculty members, and she was asked to withdraw her application. Shortly after Elizabeth Blackwell's graduation from Geneva College in 1849, Hunt applied to Harvard again, but was denied.

In 1866, two women with extensive medical education elsewhere applied but were denied admission. In 1867, a single faculty member's vote blocked the admission of Susan Dimock. In 1872, Harvard declined a gift of $10,000 conditioned on the medical school admitting women medical students on the same terms as men. A similar offer of $50,000, by a group of ten women including Marie Elizabeth Zakrzewska, was declined in 1882; a committee of five was appointed to study the matter. After the medical school moved from North Grove Street to Boylston Street in 1883, professor Henry Ingersoll Bowditch's proposal that the North Grove Street premises be used for medical education for women was rejected.

In 1943, a dean's committee recommended the admission of women, the proportion of men and women being dependent solely on the qualifications of the applicants. In 1945, the first class of women was admitted; projected benefits included helping male students learn to view women as equals, increasing the number of physicians in lower-paid specialties typically shunned by men, and replacing the weakest third of all-male classes with better-qualified women. By 1972, about one-fifth of Harvard medical students were women.

==== African Americans ====
In 1850, three black men, Martin Delany, Daniel Laing Jr., and Isaac H. Snowden, were admitted to the school but were later expelled under pressure from faculty and other students.

HMS began formally accepting black students after the Civil War. One of the first black graduates was Edwin C. J. T. Howard, who went on to cofound Frederick Douglass Memorial Hospital and Training School. In 1893, Lewis Hayden, a former escaped slave, established a scholarship for black students. In 1919, the first Rosenwald Fund scholarship was awarded to the established Antiguan doctor William Samuel Quinland to study at HMS, who then offered him a professorship; he declined.

In 1968, in response to a petition signed by hundreds of medical students, the faculty established a commission on relations with the black community in Boston; at the time less than one percent of Harvard medical students were black. By 1973, the number of black students admitted had tripled, and by the next year, it had quadrupled. In 2011, HMS appointed its first African American full professor of medicine, Valerie E. Stone. That year they also appointed their first African-American professor of radiology, Stone's former classmate Tina Young Poussaint.

In 2019, LaShyra Nolen was the first black woman to be elected class president of Harvard Medical School.

== Medical education ==
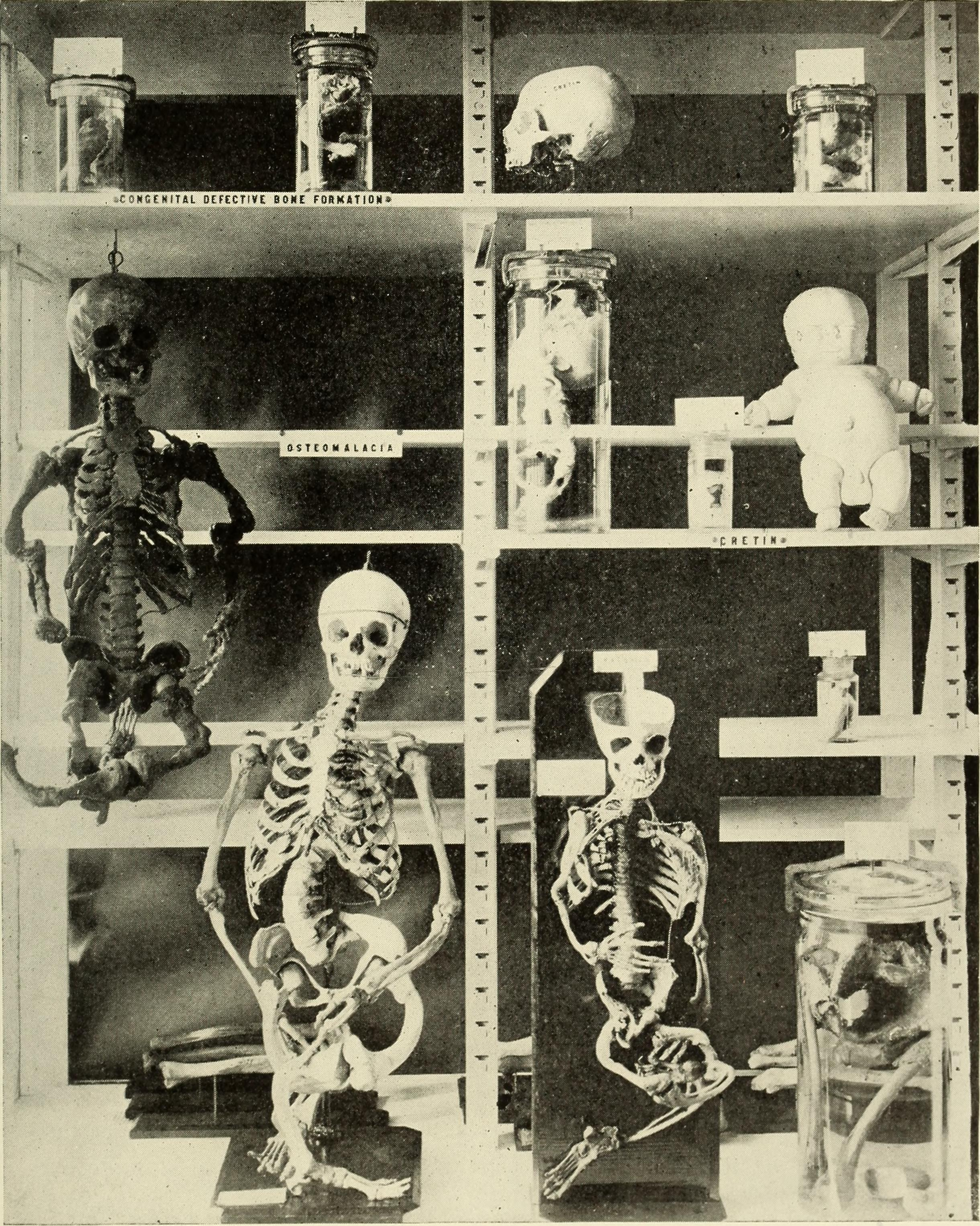
1910 photo showing abnormal specimens in the collection of the Warren Anatomical Museum at HMS (named for its founder John Collins Warren, first dean of HMS)

=== Curriculum ===
Harvard Medical School has gone through many curricular revisions for its MD program. In recent decades, HMS has maintained a three-phase curriculum with a classroom-based pre-clerkship phase, a principal clinical experience (PCE), and a post-PCE phase.

The pre-clerkship phase has two curricular tracks. The majority of students enter the more traditional Pathways track that focuses on active learning and earlier entry into the clinic with courses that include students from the Harvard School of Dental Medicine. Pathways students gain early exposure to the clinic through a longitudinal clinical skills course that lasts the duration of the pre-clerkship phase. A small portion of each class enters the HST track, which is jointly administered with MIT. The HST track is designed to train physician-scientists with an emphasis on basic physiology and quantitative understanding of biological processes through courses that include Ph.D. students from MIT.

=== Admissions ===
Admission to Harvard Medical School's MD program is highly selective. There are 165 total spots for each incoming class, with 135 spots in the Pathways curriculum and 30 spots in the HST program. While both use a single application, each curricular track independently evaluates applicants.

For the MD Class of 2023, 6,815 candidates applied, and 227 were admitted (3.3%). There was a matriculation rate of 73%.

=== Rankings ===
For 2024, U.S. News & World Report did not rank Harvard Medical School due to its official withdrawal from the USNWR. For 2023, Blue Ridge Institute for Medical Research reported that Harvard Medical School was No. 43 in Research.

== Graduate education ==
=== PhD degree programs ===
There are nine PhD programs based in Harvard Medical School. Students in these programs are enrolled in the Division of Medical Sciences in Graduate School of Arts and Sciences (GSAS) and are part of the HILS (Harvard Integrated Life Sciences) inter-program federation.

=== Master's degree programs ===
Harvard Medical School offers two types of master's degrees: Master of Medical Sciences (MMSc) degrees and Master of Science (MS) degrees.

=== Postgraduate certificate programs ===
Harvard Medical School offers several Postgraduate Certificate programs. These graduate-level programs may run up to twelve months. Admitted participants are awarded a Certificate from Harvard Medical School upon successful completion, and are eligible for associate membership in the Harvard Alumni Association.

== Affiliated teaching hospitals and research institutes ==
Harvard Medical School does not directly own or operate any hospitals and instead relies on affiliated teaching hospitals for clinical education. Medical students primarily complete their clinical experiences at the following hospitals. Clinical faculty at Harvard Medical School generally hold a concurrent appointment as a physician or a surgeon at one of the affiliated hospitals. Basic science faculty at Harvard Medical School may hold the primary appointment at the School itself or one of the affiliated hospitals.

- Boston Children's Hospital
- Dana–Farber Cancer Institute
- Beth Israel Deaconess Medical Center
- Brigham and Women's Hospital
- Cambridge Health Alliance
- Harvard Pilgrim Health Care Institute
- Hebrew SeniorLife
- Joslin Diabetes Center
- The Baker Center for Children and Families
- Massachusetts Eye and Ear
- Massachusetts General Hospital
- McLean Hospital
- Mount Auburn Hospital
- Spaulding Rehabilitation Hospital
- VA Boston Healthcare System

== Notable alumni ==
As of 2020, there are over 10,425 alumni.

== See also ==
- Boston Medical Library
- Harvard School of Dental Medicine
- List of Harvard University people
- Warren Anatomical Museum
