= Brookline Village =

- Brookline Village Commercial District
- U.S. National Register of Historic Places
- U.S. Historic district
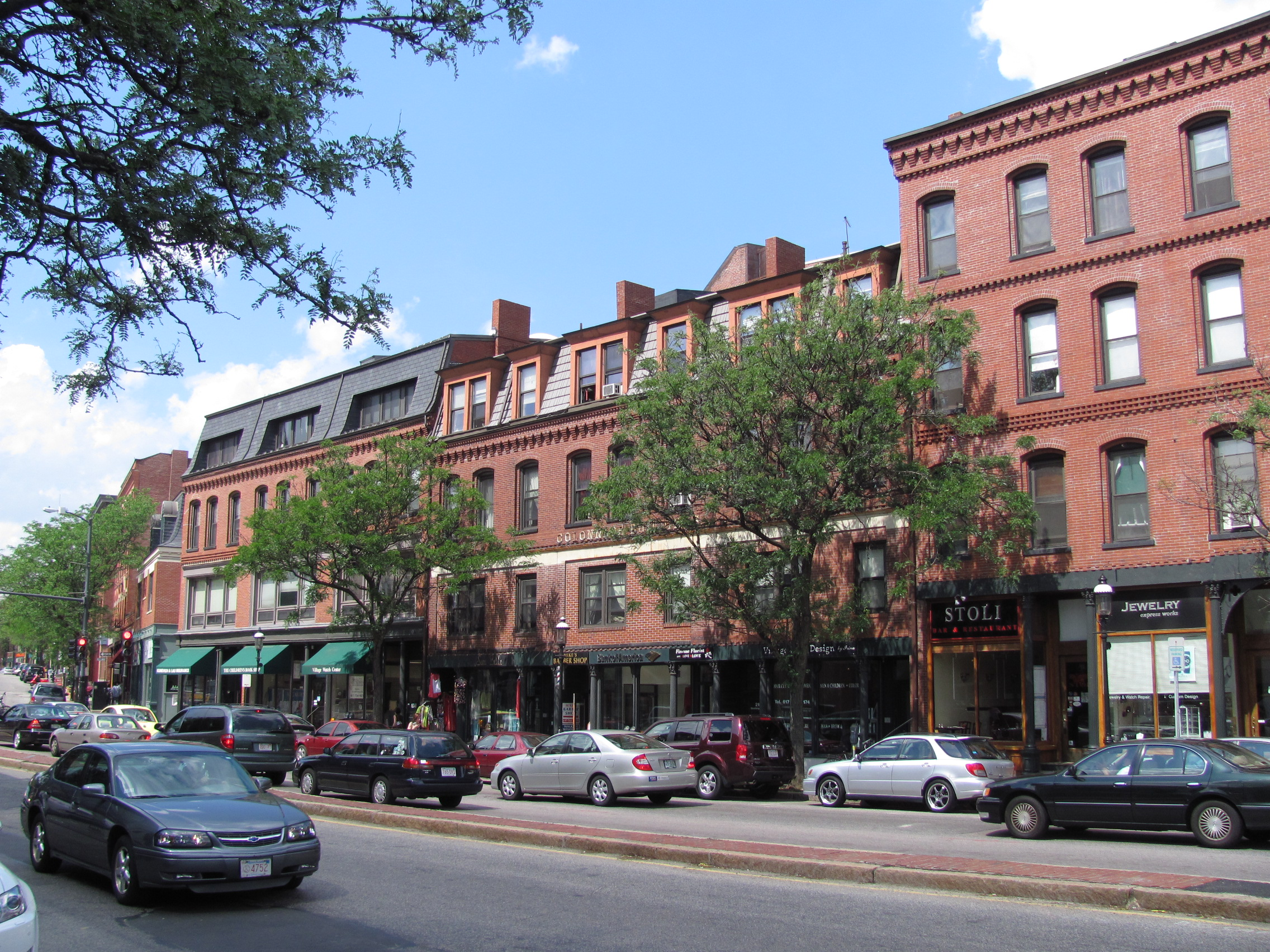
- Washington Street

- Location within Massachusetts Location within the United States
- Location: Irregular Pattern along Washington St., Brookline, Massachusetts
- Coordinates: 42°20′0″N 71°7′16″W
- Architect: Multiple
- NRHP reference No.: 79000364
- Added to NRHP: May 22, 1979

Brookline Village is one of the major commercial and retail centers of the town of Brookline, Massachusetts, United States. Located just north of Massachusetts Route 9 and west of the Muddy River, it is the historic center of the town and includes its major civic buildings, including town hall and the public library. The commercial spine of the village, extending along Washington Street from Route 9 to the library, is a historic district listed on the National Register of Historic Places as the Brookline Village Commercial District.

== History ==
Brookline Village was the first significant site, known as Muddy River, of colonial settlement in what is now Brookline, due to the crossing of the Muddy River, which provided overland access between Boston and Cambridge (then little more than a village at what is now Harvard Square). The village grew from this beginning to become Brookline's first major economic center. In the 19th century commercial activity was concentrated on Boylston, Washington, and Harvard Streets, and grew with the construction of what is now Brookline Avenue, and the arrival of the rail line that now serves the MBTA.

Brookline Village was once known as Punch Bowl Village, named after the Punch Bowl Tavern, and for a time was part of Roxbury.

== Public transportation ==
Brookline Village is served by the MBTA's Green Line D-train at the Brookline Village station, with service to downtown Boston. The area is also served by the MBTA's bus service.

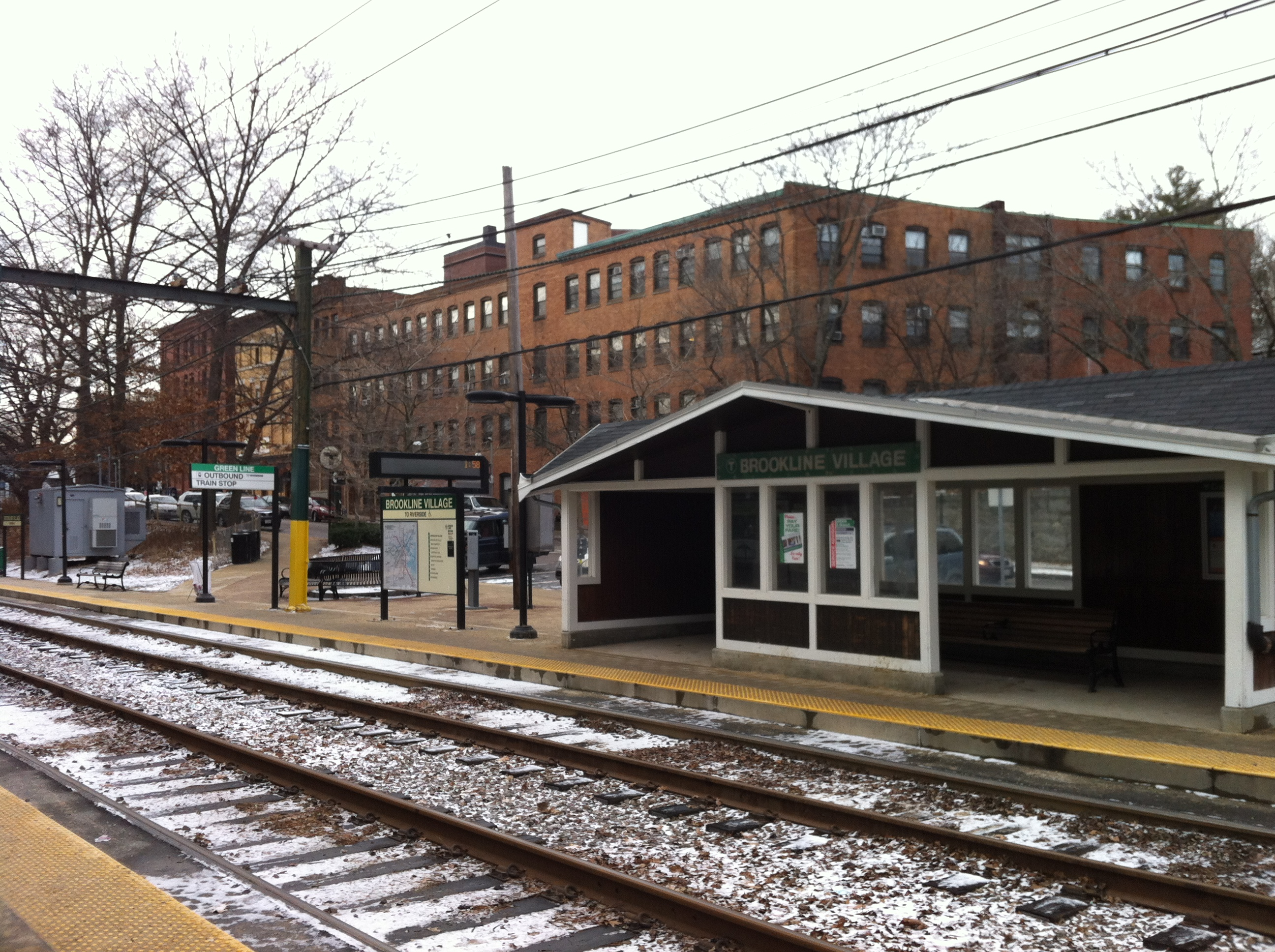
Brookline Village, Brookline, MA MBTA D-Train stop

== See also ==
- National Register of Historic Places listings in Brookline, Massachusetts
