= House at 5 Lincoln Road =

Historic house in Massachusetts, United States

- U.S. National Register of Historic Places
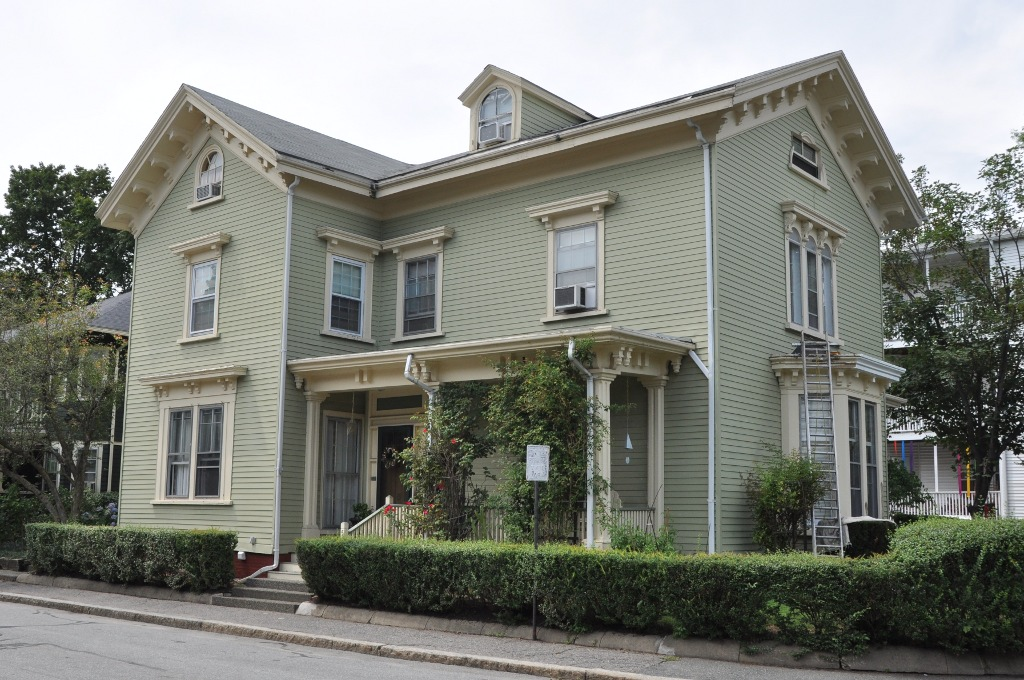

- Location within Massachusetts Location within the United States
- Location: 5 Lincoln Rd., Brookline, Massachusetts
- Coordinates: 42°20′2″N 71°7′33″W
- Built: 1852
- Architectural style: Italianate
- MPS: Brookline MRA
- NRHP reference No.: 85003290
- Added to NRHP: October 17, 1985

The House at 5 Lincoln Road in Brookline, Massachusetts, is a well-preserved local example of Italianate architecture. This 2 1/2-story wood-frame house was probably built in 1852 by Samuel Crafts, around the same time he built the nearby House at 25 Stanton Road. The two houses were essentially identical in their original construction; 25 Stanton underwent some modification in the 1870s. This house exhibits classical Italianiate styling, including deep bracketed eaves, and round-arch windows in the gables, as well as heavy cornices over the windows.

The house was listed on the National Register of Historic Places in 1985.

== See also ==
- National Register of Historic Places listings in Brookline, Massachusetts
