= List of works by Sam Gilliam =

Works by American artist Sam Gilliam

American artist Sam Gilliam (November 30, 1933 – June 25, 2022) produced thousands of paintings, sculptures, prints, and works of art in various mediums throughout his career. Below are chronological, though incomplete, lists of works by Gilliam.

Gilliam's artistic practice encompassed and often blurred the lines between painting, sculpture, printmaking, and installation art. Many of Gilliam's key artistic achievements and styles are premised on combining elements of painting and sculpture in particular, including his Drape paintings on canvas that are often installed like free-hanging fabric sculptures, his Slice paintings on canvas displayed on sculptured stretcher bars that extend the paintings several inches off the wall, and his extensive series of painted wood and metal constructions. As such, it can be difficult to neatly categorize works by Gilliam into these distinct branches of visual art; these lists do not attempt to divide Gilliam's practice between sculpture and painting, instead sorting painted and sculptural works into categories according to the base material of the work (e.g., painted canvas, painted metal, etc.), along with the installation method (e.g., stretched, mounted, etc.). Works primarily created with printmaking techniques are listed separately. Non-extant works or works presumed to be destroyed - including several of Gilliam's site-responsive Drape installations - are also listed in a separate section at the end of these lists. Maquettes are listed directly below the work they were modeled for, regardless of medium.

Descriptions of mediums and work dimensions are primarily sourced from the print or digital museum and gallery catalogues of Gilliam's exhibitions and public collection databases of museums and galleries that own his works. When discrepancies exist between a collection's description of an individual work's materials or size and a published catalogue's description of the materials or size, this article defers to the collection's description. Public collections are listed where known; works in unknown or private collections are listed without collections and may be owned by the artist's estate.

== Painting and painted sculpture ==
=== Unstretched and unmounted painted canvas ===
Includes unstretched painted canvas and canvas alternatives (e.g., nylon, fabric, etc.), and unstretched canvas installed with physical objects, including sawhorses, metal beams, and stones.

==== 1960s ====
- Bow Form Construction (1968); Acrylic and enamel on draped canvas; Overall: 119 7/16 × 332 5/16 in (303.4 × 844.1 cm) [irreg.]; Whitney Museum, New York
- Carousel State (1968); Acrylic and aluminum powder on canvas; Overall: 119.13 × 846.22 in (302.6 × 2149.4 cm), 157 × 264 in (398.8 × 670.6 cm) [irreg.]; Metropolitan Museum of Art, New York
- Double Merge (Carousel I and Carousel II) (1968); Acrylic on canvas; Left panel: 122 × 800 1/2 in (309.9 × 2033.3 cm), right panel: 118 5/8 × 862 1/2 in (301.3 × 2190.8 cm); Museum of Fine Arts, Houston, and Dia Art Foundation, New York (jointly owned)
- Niagara (1968); Acrylic on canvas; 120 × 528 in (304.8 × 1341.1 cm)
- Relative (1968); Acrylic on canvas; Overall: 120 × 528 in (304.8 × 1341.1 cm), installed: 120 × 162 in (304.8 × 411.48 cm) [irreg.]; National Gallery of Art, Washington, D.C.
- Swing Sketch (1968); Acrylic on canvas with leather cord; 73 3/4 × 89 3/4 × 9 in (187.3 × 228 × 22.9 cm), dimensions vary with installation
- 10/27/69 (1969); Acrylic on canvas; 140 × 185 × 16 in (355.6 × 469.9 × 40.6 cm); Museum of Modern Art, New York
- Carousel Form II (1969); Acrylic on canvas; 120 × 900 in (303.8 × 720.1 cm); Speed Art Museum, Louisville, Kentucky
- Combustion (1969); Acrylic on canvas; 133 1/2 × 151 1/4 × 15 in (339.1 × 384.2 × 38.1 cm), dimensions vary with installation
- Cut (1969); Acrylic on raw canvas with rawhide; 68 × 97.5 × 6 in (172.7 × 247.7 × 15.2 cm)
- Dakar I (1969); Acrylic on canvas; 113 × 59 × 14 in (287 × 149.9 × 35.6 cm); Philadelphia Museum of Art
- Genghis (1969); Acrylic on raw canvas, rawhide, acrylic on wood ball; 62 × 120 × 9 in (157.5 × 304.8 × 22.9 cm)
- Light Depth (1969); Acrylic on canvas; 120 × 900 in (304.8 × 2286 cm); Hirshhorn Museum and Sculpture Garden, Smithsonian Institution, Washington, D.C.
- Swing (1969); Acrylic and aluminum on canvas; 119 5/8 × 283 1/2 in (303.8 × 720.1 cm); Smithsonian American Art Museum, Washington, D.C.

==== 1970s ====
- Arc II (1970); Acrylic on unstretched canvas; 47 × 90 in (119.4 × 228.6 cm); Museum of Fine Arts, Houston
- Balance (1970); Acrylic on canvas with cowhide strips; 69 × 72 × 12 in (175.3 × 182.9 × 30.5 cm); Museum of Fine Arts, Boston
- Basque 1 Range (1970); Acrylic and aluminum on canvas; 67 × 118 in (170.2 × 299.7 cm); Pérez Art Museum Miami
- Carousel (1970); Acrylic on unstretched canvas; 118 × 805 in (199.72 × 2044.7 cm); Madison Museum of Contemporary Art, Madison, Wisconsin
- Carousel Change (1970); Acrylic on canvas and leather; Installed: 140.1 × 283.4 in (356 × 720 cm); Tate, London
- Change (1970); Acrylic on canvas; 75.98 × 118.11 in (193 × 300 cm); Mumok, Vienna, Austria
- Cloud Kilimanjaro (1970); Acrylic on canvas; 65 × 65 × 16 in (165.1 × 165.1 × 40.6 cm); High Museum of Art, Atlanta
- Dakar (1970); Acrylic on canvas; 109 × 98 in (276.86 × 248.92 cm) [full canvas]
- Drape (1970); Acrylic on canvas; 90 × 68 × 14 in (228.6 × 172.72 × 35.56 cm)
- Drape Work (formerly Untitled) (1970); Acrylic on canvas; 108 × 108 in; Ogden Museum of Southern Art, New Orleans
- Half Circle, Green (1970); Acrylic on canvas; 30 × 66 × 7 1/2 in (76.2 × 167.64 × 19 cm)
- Idylls (1970); Acrylic, metallic paint, traces of crayon, and rawhide on canvas; 76 × 61 in (193 × 154.9 cm)
- Leaf (1970); Acrylic on canvas; 121 3/4 × 186 × 12 1/2 in (309.25 × 472.44 × 31.75 cm); Dallas Museum of Art
- Mazda (1970); Acrylic on canvas; Installed: 135 × 90 in (342.9 × 228.6 cm); Crystal Bridges Museum of American Art, Bentonville, Arkansas
- One (1970); Acrylic on unstretched canvas; Installed: 92 × 67 in (233.7 × 170.2 cm), unfolded: 116 1/4 × 67 1/4 in (295.3 × 170.8 cm); Mary and Leigh Block Museum of Art, Evanston, Illinois
- One On (1970); Acrylic on canvas; 123 × 93 × 13 in (312.4 × 236.2 × 33 cm), dimensions vary with installation
- Quadrille (1970); Acrylic on cutout canvas with leather tongs; 86 × 86 in (218.44 × 218.44 cm)
- Red Register (1970); Acrylic on canvas; 89 × 37 × 6 in (226.1 × 94 × 15.3 cm)
- Rio (1970); Acrylic on canvas; Dimensions variable; Honolulu Museum of Art
- Rite (1970); Acrylic on canvas; 100 × 74 × 20 in (254 × 188 × 50.8 cm), dimensions vary with installation
- Simmering (1970); Acrylic on canvas and leather string; 85 × 53.27 in (215.9 × 135.3 cm); Tate, London
- Street (1970); Acrylic on canvas; 104 × 73 × 16 in (264.2 × 185.4 × 40.6 cm); San Francisco Museum of Modern Art
- Three Point (1970); Acrylic on canvas; 296 × 118 in (751.8 × 299.7 cm); Dayton Art Institute, Dayton, Ohio
- Untitled (1970); Acrylic on canvas; 125 1/2 × 123 1/2 × 14 in (318.8 × 313.7 × 35.6 cm), dimensions vary with installation
- Arch (1971); Acrylic with fabric dyes on canvas; When flat: 108 × 108 in (274.3 × 274.3 cm); Cincinnati Art Museum
- Carousel Merge (1971); Acrylic on canvas; Installed: 120 × 900 in (304.8 × 2286 cm); Walker Art Center, Minneapolis
- Carousel Merge 2 (1971); Acrylic on canvas; 186 × 102 in (472.44 × 259.08 cm); Milwaukee Art Museum
- Little Dude (1971); Acrylic on draped canvas; Flat: 66 × 66 in (167.6 × 167.6 cm), Installed: 57 × 55 in (144.5 × 139.7 cm) [variable]
- Maya (1971); Acrylic on canvas; 92 × 50 × 9 in (233.68 × 127 × 22.86 cm)
- Rondo (1971); Acrylic on canvas with oak beams; 103 × 144 × 78 in (261.6 × 365.8 × 198.1); Kunstmuseum Basel, Switzerland
- Whisk (1971); 96 × 36 × 10 in (243.8 × 91.4 × 25.4 cm), dimensions vary with installation
- Situation VI - Pisces 4 (c 1972); Synthetic polymer paint on polypropylene fabric; Unfolded: 185 3/4 × 496 1/4 in (471.8 × 1260.5 cm); Williams College Museum of Art, Williamstown, Massachusetts
- Flipping (1972); Acrylic on canvas; 80 × 66 × 6 in (203.2 × 167.64 × 15.24 cm)
- Idle Twist (1972); Acrylic on canvas; Flat: 67 × 65 in (170.18 × 165.1 cm), installed: 48 × 60 × 12 in (121.92 × 152.4 × 30.48 cm), dimensions variable
- Ruby Light (1972); Acrylic on canvas; 80 × 57 × 12 in (203.2 × 144.7 × 30.7 cm) [approx.], dimensions vary with installation; Hirshhorn Museum and Sculpture Garden, Smithsonian Institution, Washington, D.C.
- Wall Circle I (1972); Acrylic on draped and folded canvas; 108 × 46 in (274.3 × 116.8 cm); Asheville Art Museum, Asheville, North Carolina
- "A" and the Carpenter I (1973); Acrylic and canvas draped over wooden sawhorses; Installed: 96 × 132 in (243.84 × 335.28 cm) [floor], dimensions vary with installation; Art Institute of Chicago
- Crystal (1973); 92 3/4 × 29 3/4 × 7 1/2 in (235.6 × 75.6 × 19.1 cm), dimensions vary with installation
- Fan Craze (1973); Acrylic on canvas; 61 × 58 5/8 × 9 1/2 in (154.9 × 148.9 × 24.1 cm), dimensions vary with installation
- Gram (1973); Acrylic on canvas; Diameter: 60 in (152.4 cm), depth: 1/16 in (0.2 cm); Detroit Institute of Arts
- Length Fanned (1973); Acrylic on canvas; 76 × 72 × 13 in (193 × 182.88 × 33.02 cm)
- Red Cowl (1973); Acrylic on draped canvas; Flat: 103 3/4 × 43 in (263.5 × 109.2 cm), Installed: 96 × 43 in (243.8 × 109.2 cm) [variable]
- Softly Still (1973); Acrylic, latex and dyes on polypropylene, ponderosa pine sawhorse; Painting: 182 × 119 in (462.3 × 302.3 cm), sawhorse: 30 1/4 × 36 × 13 in (76.8 × 91.4 × 33 cm); Allen Memorial Art Museum, Oberlin, Ohio
- Stand (1973); Mixed media on canvas; 85 1/2 × 118 1/4 in (217.2 × 300 cm)
- U.S.A. (1973); Acrylic on canvas; 86 1/2 × 30 × 10 in (219.7 × 76.2 × 25.4 cm), dimensions vary with installation
- Wall Circle III (1973); Acrylic on canvas with sewn felt and woven fabric swatches; Flat: 113 × 43 1/2 in (287.02 × 110.49 cm), installed: 83 × 24 1/2 × 8 in (210.82 × 62.23 × 20.32 cm), dimensions variable
- Whole Lot of Shaking (1973); Acrylic on canvas; 59 4/5 × 63 1/10 in (152 × 160.5 cm); Museum Boijmans Van Beuningen, Rotterdam
- Half Circle Red (1975); Acrylic on canvas; 78 × 33 × 6 in (198.1 × 83.8 × 15.2 cm); Saint Louis Art Museum
- Art Ramp Angle Brown (1978); Acrylic and oil enamel on canvas and nylon; 35 7/8 × 242 1/2 in (91.0 × 616.0 cm); Smithsonian American Art Museum, Washington, D.C.
- Eiler Blues (1978); Oil on stitched and unstretched awning canvas with grommets and objects; Installed: 300 × 84 × 192 in (118 × 33 × 75.5 cm) [approx.]; Madison Museum of Contemporary Art, Madison, Wisconsin
- Untitled (1978); Acrylic on polypropylene canvas; 3 × 11 1/2 × 11 1/2 in (7.6 × 29.2 × 29.2 cm); Allen Memorial Art Museum, Oberlin, Ohio
- Triple Variants (1979); Acrylic and oil with aluminum powder on canvas, aluminum beam, stones; Dimensions vary with installation; Richard B. Russell Federal Building, Atlanta (collection of General Services Administration)

- Maquette: Campus Center View (1967-1977); Painted fiber and paper, wood, stone, fabric, and plastic assembled on wood base in plexiglass case; 18 7/8 × 38 1/8 × 29 1/8 in (47.9 × 96.7 × 74.0 cm); Smithsonian American Art Museum, Washington, D.C.

==== 1990s ====
- Untitled (c. 1990s); Paint, thread, polypropylene; 18 × 13 x 110 in (46 × 33 × 3 cm)
- Well III (c. 1990s); Acrylic, thread, fabric; Dimensions variable, approx. 77 × 49 × 12 in (190 × 120 × 31 cm)
- Chinese (1990); Acrylic on shaped canvas; Dimensions variable; Washington and Lee University Museums, Lexington, Virginia
- Looking at the Moon (1991); Paint, handmade paper, thread, polypropylene; 27 × 25 × 2 in (69 × 64 × 5 cm)
- Folded Cottages II (1993); Acrylic, thread, synthetic fabric; 39 × 10 × 1 in (99 × 26 × 3 cm)
- Ballinglen (1994); Acrylic, thread, fabric; 53 × 26 1/2 × 3 in (134.6 × 67.3 × 7.6 cm)
- Doonfeeny Lower (1994); Acrylic, thread, fabric; 24 × 53 × 3 in (61 × 134.6 × 7.6 cm)
- Down Patricks' Head (1994); Acrylic, thread, fabric; 57 1/2 × 28 × 3 in (146 × 71.1 × 7.6 cm)
- Magician's Mail (1994); Acrylic, thread, canvas; Dimensions variable, approx. 77 × 55 × 14 in (196 x 140 × 36 cm)
- Silhouette on Template (1994); Acrylic, thread, canvas; Dimensions variable, approx. 47 × 158 × 14 in (120 × 402 × 36 cm)
- Silhouettes/Templates (1) (1994); Acrylic, thread, canvas; Dimensions variable, approx. 47 × 69 × 14 in (120 × 176 × 36 cm)
- Silhouette/Template (2) (1994); Acrylic, thread, fabric, canvas; Dimensions variable, approx. 60 × 75 × 11 in (152 × 190 × 28)
- Triangular (1994); Acrylic, thread, synthetic fabric, canvas; Dimensions variable, approx. 50 × 46 × 12 in (127 x 117 × 30 cm)
- Untitled (1994); Acrylic, thread, fabric; 59 1/2 × 27 1/2 × 3 in (151.1 × 70 × 7.6 cm)
- Untitled (1994); Acrylic, thread, fabric; Dimensions variable, approx. 74 × 62 × 12 in (188 × 158 × 31 cm)
- All Cats Are Grey at Night (1996); Acrylic on canvas; 65 × 44 × 8 in (165.1 × 111.76 × 20.32 cm), dimensions variable
- Curtains (1996); Acrylic, thread, canvas; Dimensions variable, approx. 92 × 100 × 16 in (234 × 254 × 41 cm)
- Round (1996); Acrylic, thread, canvas; Dimensions variable, approx. 71 × 69 × 9 in (181 × 176 × 23 cm)
- Norfolk Keels (1998); Acrylic on canvas; Section A: 312 × 164 in (792.5 × 416.6 cm), section B: 301 × 115 in (764.5 × 292.1 cm), section C: 463 × 101 in (1176 × 256.5 cm), section D: 322 × 164 in (817.9 × 416.6 cm), section E: 336 × 82 in (853.4 × 208.3 cm), section F: 412 × 98 in (1046.5 × 248.9 cm); Chrysler Museum of Art, Norfolk, Virginia
- Beyond the Blue Door (1999); Acrylic on nylon; El Paso Art Museum, El Paso, Texas
- One Guitar (1999); Acrylic, thread, canvas; Dimensions variable, approx. 46 × 65 × 5 in (117 × 165 × 13 cm)

==== 2000s ====
- Chair Key (2002); Acrylic on cotton duck; 240 × 60 in (609.6 × 152.4 cm); Philander Smith College, Little Rock, Arkansas
- The Illustrious Kites Made in Boxing Styles (2004); Acrylic on flag bunting; 600 × 180 in (1524 × 457.2 cm); Mint Museum, Charlotte, North Carolina
- Rotunda Unwound (2005); Acrylic on IFR muslin; 108 × 44 × 36 in (274.32 × 111.76 × 91.44 cm); Currier Museum of Art, Manchester, New Hampshire
- Mali (2006); Acrylic polyester muslin; Dimensions variable; Embassy of the United States, Bamako (Collection of United States Department of State)
- Alber's Chains (2008); Acrylic on nylon; Part 1: 242 × 94 1/4 in (614.68 × 239.4 cm), part 2: 94 1/4 × 47 3/4 in (239.4 × 121.29 cm), part 3: 94 1/4 × 242 in (239.4 × 614.68 cm); University of Michigan Museum of Art, Ann Arbor, Michigan
- Count on Us (2008); Acrylic on polyester muslin; Dimensions vary, approx. 102 × 80 × 24 in (259 × 203 × 61 cm)
- Dance Me, Dance You 2, #1-3 (2009); Acrylic on polyester; Installed: 52 × 42 × 35 in (132.1 × 106.7 × 88.9 cm) [three parts]; Museum of Contemporary Art San Diego

==== 2010s ====
- Tempo Series: #1 (2009/2010); Acrylic on canvas; 70 × 38 × 11 in (177.8 × 96.5 × 27.9 cm) [approx.]
- Tempo Series: #2 (2009/2010); Acrylic on canvas; 72 × 36 × 11.5 in (182.8 × 91.44 × 29.2 cm) [approx.]
- Tempo Series: #3 (2009/2010); Acrylic on canvas; 67 × 32 × 13 in (170.1 × 81.28 × 33 cm) [approx.]
- Tempo Series: #4 (2009/2010); Acrylic on canvas; 60 × 36 × 10 in (152.4 × 91.44 × 24.4 cm) [approx.]
- Tinkerbell's Bookcase (2010/2011); Acrylic on canvas; 72 × 46 × 10 in (182.8 × 116.8 × 25.4 cm)
- Linger (2011); Acrylic on canvas; 54 × 60 × 8.5 in (137.1 × 152.4 × 21.6 cm)
- Untitled (2011); Acrylic on polypropylene; 121 × 71 1/4 × 66 1/2 in (307.3 × 181 × 168.9 cm), dimensions vary with installation
- Untitled (2011); Acrylic on polypropylene; 178 × 51 × 47.5 in (452.1 × 129.5 × 120.7 cm), dimensions vary with installation
- Sac I (2012); Acrylic on nylon; 42 × 39 × 13 in (106.68 × 99 × 33 cm)
- Sac II (2012); Acrylic on nylon; 22 × 22 × 9 in (55.88 × 55.88 × 22.86 cm)
- Untitled (2018); Acrylic on Cerex nylon; 286 1/2 × 118 in (727.7 × 299.7 cm); Memorial Art Gallery, Rochester, New York
- Untitled (2018); Acrylic on Cerex nylon; 304 × 114 1/2 in (772.2 × 290.8 cm); Memorial Art Gallery, Rochester, New York
- Untitled (2018); Acrylic on Cerex nylon; 118 1/2 × 33 × 21 in (301 × 83.8 × 53.5 cm), dimensions vary with installation
- Untitled (2018); Acrylic on Cerex nylon; 146 × 124 × 110 in (370.8 × 315 × 279.4 cm), dimensions vary with installation
- Untitled (2018); Acrylic on Cerex nylon; 119 × 33 × 15 in (302.3 × 83.8 × 38.1 cm), dimensions vary with installation
- Untitled (2018); Acrylic on Cerex nylon; 52 × 32 × 32 in (386.1 × 81.3 × 813 cm), dimensions vary with installation
- Untitled (2018); Acrylic on Cerex nylon; 131 × 75 × 37 in (332.7 × 190.5 × 94 cm), dimensions vary with installation
- Untitled (2018); Acrylic on Cerex nylon; 135 × 26 × 26 in (342.9 × 66 × 66 cm), dimensions vary with installation
- Untitled (2018); Acrylic on Cerex nylon; 111 × 39 × 16 in (281.9 × 99.1 × 40.6 cm), dimensions vary with installation
- Untitled (2018); Acrylic on Cerex nylon; 132 × 50 × 29 in (335.3 × 127 × 73.7 cm), dimensions vary with installation
- Untitled (2018); Acrylic on Cerex nylon; 156 × 26 × 26 in (396.2 × 66 × 66 cm), dimensions vary with installation
- Untitled (2018); Acrylic on Cerex nylon; 134 × 28 × 28 in (340.4 × 71.1 × 71.1 cm), dimensions vary with installation
- Untitled (2018); Acrylic on Cerex nylon; 159 × 29 × 29 in (403.9 × 73.7 × 73.7 cm), dimensions vary with installation

==== 2020s ====
- "A" and the Carpenter II (2022); Acrylic on polypropylene, wood, and leather string; Overall: 48 × 132 × 192 in (121.9 × 335.3 × 487.7 cm), sawhorse: 48 × 28 1/2 × 55 in (121.9 × 72.4 × 139.7 cm), dimensions vary with installation

=== Mounted or stretched painted canvas ===
Includes paintings on canvas with individual mixed media elements, including metal, fabric, and collage.

==== 1960s ====
- Figure in Still-life Group (self-portrait) (1961); Oil on masonite; 22 1/8 × 27 7/8 in (56.2 × 70.8 cm); University of Louisville Art Collection; Louisville, Kentucky
- First Season (1962); Oil on cotton canvas; 38 × 28 in (96.52 × 71.12 cm)
- Diamas #9 (1964); Acrylic on canvas; 80.25 × 80.50 in (203.84 × 204.47 cm)
- Swing 64 (1964); Acrylic on canvas; 35 3/4 × 36 1/8 in (90.8 × 91.76 cm)
- Blue Let (1965); Acrylic on canvas; 71 3/8 × 47 1/8 × 3/4 in (181.3 × 119.7 × 1.9 cm)
- Coronet (1965); Acrylic on canvas; 70 11/16 × 48 15/16 × 1 1/2 in (179.5 × 124.3 × 3.8 cm)
- Dual Rod (1965); Acrylic on canvas; 47 7/8 × 47 9/16 × 1 1/2 in (121.6 × 120.8 × 3.8 cm)
- Helles (1965); Acrylic on canvas; 71 3/4 × 71 5/16 × 1 1/2 in (182.2 × 181.1 × 3.8 cm)
- Herald (1965); Acrylic on canvas; 72 × 72 in (182.9 × 182.9 cm)
- Khufu (1965); Acrylic on canvas; 72 × 72 in (182.9 × 182.9 cm); Oklahoma City Museum of Art
- Koa (1965); Acrylic on canvas; 24 × 24 in (60.96 × 60.96 cm); Phillips Collection, Washington, D.C.
- Long Green (1965); Acrylic on canvas; 72 1/4 × 24 × 7/8 in (183.5 × 61 × 2.2 cm); Anacostia Community Museum, Smithsonian Institution, Washington, D.C.
- Muse I (1965); Acrylic on canvas; 36 1/8 × 36 1/16 × 7/8 in (91.7 × 91.6 × 2.2 cm); Anacostia Community Museum, Smithsonian Institution, Washington, D.C.
- Nok (1965); Acrylic on canvas; 70 5/8 × 83 1/8 × 1 1/2 in (179.4 × 211.1 × 3.8 cm)
- Shoot Six (1965); Acrylic on canvas; 56 × 56 in (142.24 × 142.24 cm); National Gallery of Art, Washington, D.C.
- Stems (1965); Acrylic on canvas; 69 × 50 × 1 1/2 in (175.3 × 127 × 3.8 cm)
- Raw Meat (1965); Acrylic on canvas; 55.50 × 53.25 in (140.97 × 135.26 cm)
- Tempo (1965); Acrylic on canvas; 56 × 56 in (142.24 × 142.24 cm)
- Theme of Five I (1965); Acrylic on canvas; 70 × 83 × 1 1/2 in (177.8 × 210.8 × 3.8 cm)
- Least Rivers (1966); Acrylic on canvas; 42.13 × 43.88 in (107 × 111.44 cm)
- Light Fan (1966); Acrylic on canvas; 36 1/4 × 36 in (92.1 × 91.4 cm); Smithsonian American Art Museum, Washington, D.C.
- Medley (1966); Acrylic on canvas; 81 × 80 in (205.7 × 203.2 cm); Baltimore Museum of Art
- Saturday (1966); Acrylic wash on cotton duck canvas; 94 1/4 × 12 1/2 in (239.4 × 31.8 cm); Tacoma Art Museum, Tacoma, Washington
- Sky Chord (1966); Acrylic on canvas; 86 1/4 × 86 in (219.1 × 218.4 cm); Oklahoma City Museum of Art
- They Sail (1966); Acrylic on canvas; 56 × 24 in (142.24 × 60.96 cm); Phillips Collection, Washington, D.C.
- Tumble II (1966); Acrylic on canvas; 78 1/2 × 78 5/8 in (199.39 × 199.71 cm)
- Blue and Red (And Again) (1967); Acrylic on canvas; 90 × 40 in (228.6 × 101.6 cm); Rollins Museum of Art, Winter Park, Florida
- Bounce (1967); Acrylic on canvas; 92 1/4 × 40 1/4 in (234.3 × 102.2 cm); Fralin Museum of Art, Charlottesville, Virginia
- Breeze 1967 (1967); Acrylic on canvas; 111 × 90 3/16 in (282 × 229 cm); Zimmerli Art Museum, Rutgers University, New Brunswick, New Jersey
- Clear (1967); Acrylic on canvas; 48 × 92 in (121.92 × 233.68 cm)
- Cluster (1967); Acrylic, dye pigments, and bronze and aluminum powder on canvas; 86 × 22 1/2 × 2 in (218.4 × 57.1 × 5.1 cm)
- Green Web (1967); Acrylic on canvas; 90 1/2 × 39 3/4 in (230.0 × 101.0 cm); Smithsonian American Art Museum, Washington, D.C.
- Member (1967); Acrylic, due pigments, and aluminum powder on canvas; 90 × 43 3/4 × 1 in (228.6 × 111.1 × 5.1 cm)
- Red Petals (1967); Acrylic on canvas; 88 × 93 in (223.52 × 236.22 cm); Phillips Collection, Washington, D.C.
- Scope (1967); Acrylic on canvas; 89 3/8 × 48 1/4 × 2 1/2 in (227 × 122.6 × 6.4 cm)
- Slide (1967); Acrylic on canvas; 94 × 88 in (238.76 × 223.52 cm)
- Thrust (1967); Acrylic on canvas with beveled edge; 83 × 44 in (210.8 × 111.8 cm)
- Vertical (1967); Oil on canvas; 43 3/4 × 23 3/4 in (111.1 × 60.3 cm); Herbert F. Johnson Museum of Art, Ithaca, New York
- With Blue (1967); Aluminum with acrylic medium on canvas; 104 1/2 × 40 in (265.43 × 101.60 cm); George Washington University Art Collection, Washington, D.C.
- Alphabet I, II, and III (1968); Acrylic on canvas; 70 × 90 in (177.8 × 228.6 cm); Fralin Museum of Art, Charlottesville, Virginia
- April 4 (Part III) (1968); Acrylic on canvas; 114 × 21 × 4 in (289.6 × 53.3 × 10.2 cm); Studio Museum in Harlem, New York
- Born Again (Homage) (1968); Magna and acrylic on canvas with aluminum powder; 119 × 176 in (302.26 × 447.04 cm); Virginia Museum of Fine Arts, Richmond, Virginia
- In Seconds (1968); Acrylic on canvas; 107 × 131 in (271.78 × 332.74 cm)
- Restore (1968); Magna and acrylic on canvas with aluminum powder; 108 3/4 × 152 3/4 in (276.2 × 388 cm); Speed Art Museum, Louisville, Kentucky
- Rose Rising (1968); Acrylic on canvas; 97 × 132 × 3 7/8 in (246.4 × 335.3 × 9.8 cm)
- Rouge (1968); Acrylic on canvas; 65 × 52 1/4 × 1 7/8 in (165.1 × 132.7 × 4.8 cm)
- Snakebite (1968); Acrylic on canvas; 114 × 43 × 2 1/4 in (289.6 × 109.2 × 5.7 cm)
- Through Expanses (1968); Acrylic on canvas; 111 × 87.4 in (282 × 222 cm); Kunstmuseum Basel, Switzerland
- Along (1969); Acrylic on canvas; 111 × 144 × 2 in (281.9 × 365.8 × 5.1 cm); National Gallery of Canada, Ottawa
- Alphabet II (1969); Acrylic on canvas; 78 × 51 × 2 in (198.1 × 129.5 × 5.1 cm); Howard University Gallery of Art, Washington, D.C.
- April 4 (1969); Acrylic on canvas; 110 × 179 3/4 in (279.4 × 456.6 cm); Smithsonian American Art Museum, Washington, D.C.
- Atmosphere I (1969); Acrylic on canvas; 105 3/4 × 195 3/4 × 3 7/8 in (268.6 × 497.2 × 9.8 cm)
- Cape (1969); Acrylic on canvas; 110 × 110 in (558.8 × 558.8 cm); Kreeger Museum, Washington, D.C.
- Dark Felled (1969); Acrylic on canvas; Sidwell Friends School, Washington, D.C.
- Green April (1969); Acrylic on canvas; 98 × 271 × 3 7/8 in (248.9 × 688.5 × 9.85 cm); Kunstmuseum Basel, Switzerland
- Minor Grids (1969); Acrylic on canvas; 70 × 30 in (177.80 × 76.20 cm); George Washington University Art Collection, Washington, D.C.
- Misty (1969); Acrylic and dye pigments on canvas with beveled edge; 53 1/4 × 66 1/2 in (135.3 × 168.9 cm)
- Out (1969); Acrylic on canvas; 113 1/2 × 152 1/2 × 2 in (288.3 × 387.4 × 5.1 cm)
- Parallel (1969); Oil stained shaped canvas; 54 1/4 × 30 1/4 × 2 in (137.8 × 76.8 × 5.1 cm); Allen Memorial Art Museum, Oberlin, Ohio
- Pink Flutter (1969); Acrylic on canvas; 107 × 86 in (271.8 × 218.44 cm); Chazen Museum of Art, Madison, Wisconsin
- Red Glide (1969); Acrylic on canvas; 125 × 245 in (317.5 × 622.3 cm)
- Red Stanza (1969); Acrylic on canvas; 54 3/4 × 118 3/8 × 1 7/8 in (139.1 × 300.7 × 4.8 cm)

==== 1970s ====
- Back (1970); Acrylic on canvas; 103 × 144 × 3 7/8 in (261.6 × 365.8 × 9.8 cm)
- Cape III (1970); Acrylic on canvas; Columbia Museum of Art, Columbia, South Carolina
- Change (1970); Acrylic on canvas; 112 1/8 × 112 1/8 × 1 7/8 in (284.8 × 284.8 × 4.8 cm); Louisiana Museum of Modern Art, Humlebæk, Denmark
- Elephanta (1970); Acrylic on canvas; 54 5/16 × 113 × 1 7/8 in (138 × 287 × 4.7 cm); Princeton University Art Museum, Princeton, New Jersey
- Exist (1970); Acrylic on canvas; 51 × 79 × 2 in (129.5 × 200.7 × 5.1 cm)
- Light Red Clay (1970); Acrylic on canvas; 45.1 × 50 × 2.2 in (114.6 × 127.0 × 5.7 cm)
- Ray II (1970); Acrylic on canvas; 49 × 107 3/8 × 2 in (124.5 × 272.7 × 5.1 cm)
- Ray VII (1970); Acrylic on canvas; 51 1/4 × 108 × 3 in (130.2 × 274.3 × 7.6 cm)
- Red April (1970); Acrylic on canvas; 116 1/2 × 161 × 3 in (295.91 × 408.94 × 7.62 cm); University of Iowa Stanley Museum of Art, Iowa City, Iowa
- Temple Fire (1970); Acrylic on canvas with beveled edge; 50 × 110 in (127 × 279.4 cm)
- Untitled (1970); Acrylic on canvas with beveled edge; 55 × 110 in (139.7 × 279.4 cm)
- Whirlirama (1970); Acrylic on canvas; 111 1/4 × 115 in (282.6 × 293.4 cm); Metropolitan Museum of Art, New York
- Inlana (1969–1971); Oil and acrylic on canvas; 45 × 70 × 2 in (114.3 × 177.8 × 5.1 cm); Telfair Museums, Savannah, Georgia
- April (1971); Acrylic on canvas; 60 × 60 × 2 1/2 in (152.4 × 152.4 × 6.3 cm); Phillips Collection, Washington, D.C.
- Atmosphere IV (1971); Acrylic on canvas; 120 × 245 in (304.8 × 622.3 cm)
- Bay (1971); Acrylic on canvas; 74 × 71 in (187.96 × 180.34 cm)
- Blue Edge (1971); Acrylic on canvas; 71 7/8 × 71 3/4 in (182.6 × 182.2 cm); Baltimore Museum of Art
- Blue Twirl (1971); Acrylic on canvas; 72 × 72 × 2 1/2 in (182.9 × 182.9 × 6.4 cm); National Museum of African American History and Culture, Smithsonian Institution, Washington, D.C.
- Day Tripper (1971); Acrylic on canvas; 110 × 110 1/4 × 2 1/4 in (279.40 × 280.04 × 5.71 cm); Carnegie Museum of Art, Pittsburgh
- Lady Day (1971); Acrylic on canvas; 120 × 245 in (304.8 × 622.3 cm)
- Lady Day II (1971); Acrylic on canvas; 110 × 245 in (279.4 × 622.3 cm)
- Repeat (1971); Acrylic on canvas; 72.0 × 71.9 × 3.0 in (182.9 × 182.6 × 7.6 cm)
- After Glow (1972); Acrylic and dye pigments on canvas; 62 1/4 × 100 1/4 × 2 in. (188.6 × 254.6 × S.1 cm)
- April 4 (1972); Acrylic on canvas; 72 1/2 × 48 in (184.2 × 121.9 cm); National Museum of African American History and Culture, Smithsonian Institution, Washington, D.C.
- Asking (1972); Acrylic on canvas; 81 × 75 in (205.7 × 190.5 cm); Hyde Collection, Glens Falls, New York
- Bursting (1972); Acrylic on canvas; 77 × 73 × 2 in (195.6 × 185.4 × 5.1 cm)
- Butterfly, Feeling (1972); 60 × 60 × 2 1/8 in (152.4 × 152.4 × 5.4 cm)
- Certain (1972); Acrylic on canvas; 74 × 84 in (187.96 × 213.36 cm); National Gallery of Art, Washington, D.C.
- Cordial I (1972); Oil on canvas; 76 × 73 in (193 × 185.4 cm); Nova Southeastern University Art Museum, Fort Lauderdale, Florida
- Crosstown (1972); Acrylic on canvas; 69 3/4 × 85 × 2 1/2 in (177.2 × 215.9 × 6.4 cm)
- Haystack (1972); Acrylic on canvas; 73 7/8 × 75 3/4 × 1 7/8 in (187.64 × 192.41 × 4.76 cm); Yale University Art Gallery, New Haven, Connecticut
- May III (1972); Acrylic on canvas; 54 × 109.9 × 2.2 in (137.2 × 279.1 × 5.7 cm)
- On Seven (1972); Oil on canvas; 14 × 115 in (35.56 × 292.10 cm); George Washington University Art Collection; Washington, D.C.
- Scatter (1972); Acrylic on canvas; 60 × 60 in (152.4 × 152.4 cm); Indianapolis Museum of Art
- Sierra (1972); Acrylic on shaped canvas; 54 1/4 × 50 1/4 in (137.8 cm × 127.64 cm); Phillips Collection, Washington, D.C.
- Spring Thaw (1972); Acrylic on canvas with beveled edge; 72 × 72 inches (182.9 × 182.9 cm)
- Starting I (1972); 40 1/2 × 71 1/2 × 2 in (102.9 × 181.6 × 5.1 cm)
- Untitled (1972); 100 × 120 × 2 1/4 in (254 × 304.8 × 5.7 cm)
- Wide Narrow (1972); Acrylic on canvas; 110 1/4 × 112 × 2 1/8 in (280.04 × 284.48 × 5.4 cm); Rose Art Museum, Waltham, Massachusetts
- Yellow Edge (1972); Acrylic on canvas; 55 × 45 in (139.7 × 114.3 cm); National Gallery of Art, Washington, D.C.
- Adolph Queequeg Slumber (1973); Oil and oil pastel on canvas; 29 1/4 × 58 1/4 in (74.29 × 147.95 cm)
- Clear Arounds (1973); 52 × 48 × 3 in (132.1 × 121.9 × 7.6 cm)
- Frost I (1973); Acrylic on canvas with beveled edge; 48 3/4 × 51 in (123.8 × 129.5 cm)
- Frost II (1973); Acrylic on canvas; 49 × 51 × 2 in (124.5 × 104.1 × 5.1 cm); Dayton Art Institute, Dayton, Ohio
- Green Lizzie (1973); Acrylic on canvas; 58 × 54 in (147.3 × 137.2 cm); McNay Art Museum, San Antonio
- Last September IV (1973); Acrylic on canvas; 57 × 71 1/2 × 2 1/4 in (144.8 × 181.6 × 5.7 cm); North Carolina Museum of Art, Raleigh, North Carolina
- Leah Lathers (1973); 51 × 49 × 1 1/2 in (129.5 × 124.5 × 3.8 cm)
- A Little I (1973); Acrylic on canvas; 55 × 51 × 2 in (139.7 × 129.5 × 5.1 cm)
- Skate Zing Orange (1973); Acrylic on canvas; 61 × 73 in (155 × 185.5 cm); Baltimore Museum of Art
- Spread (1973); Acrylic on canvas; 69 × 113 1/2 × 1 3/4 in (175.3 × 288.3 × 4.4 cm)
- Tinsel (1973); Acrylic on canvas; 51 × 48 in (129.5 × 121.9 cm)
- Bacchus (1974–1975); Acrylic, oil and dye pigments on collaged, flat, mounted canvas; 51 × 96 in (129.54 × 243.84 cm)
- Darted Again (1974–1975); Acrylic, oil and dye pigments on collaged, flat, mounted canvas; 51 × 96 in (129.54 × 243.84 cm); Miami-Dade County Department of Cultural Affairs, Miami
- For Day One (1974–1975); Acrylic on canvas with collage; 49 × 49 in (124.46 × 124.46 cm); Speed Art Museum, Louisville, Kentucky
- Over (1975-1975); Acrylic, oil, and dye pigments on collaged, flat, mounted canvas; Diameter: 45 1/2 in (115.57 cm)
- [Untitled] (c. 1975); Acrylic on canvas; 30 × 30 in (76.2 × 76.2 cm); Brooklyn Museum, New York
- Baptistry Senior II (1975); Acrylic and wood on canvas with collage; 57 × 45 in (144.78 × 114.3 cm)
- Element (1975); Acrylic on canvas; 38 × 60 in (96.5 × 152.4 cm); University of Louisville Art Collection, Louisville, Kentucky
- Spin/Arrest (1975); Oil on canvas; 75 × 60 in (190.5 × 152.4 cm); University of Maryland Global Campus Arts Program, Adelphi, Maryland
- Toward a Red (1975); Acrylic and collage on three strips of canvas; Framed: 32 1/2 × 48 in (82.6 × 121.9 cm), unframed: 32 1/2 × 48 in (82.6 × 121.9 cm); Newark Museum of Art, Newark, New Jersey
- Untitled (1975); Acrylic on canvas with collage; 32 3/4 × 32 3/4 × 2 in (83.2 × 83.2 × 5.1 cm)
- Cathedral Rock (c. 1976); Acrylic on canvas; 42 1/2 × 20 in (108 × 50.8 cm); Newark Museum of Art, Newark, New Jersey
- Double River (1976); Acrylic on canvas with collage; 90 1/2 × 181 × 3 in (229.9 × 459.7 × 7.6 cm)
- For Brass (1976); Acrylic on canvas; 62 3/8 × 84 3/8 in (158.4 × 214.3 cm); Hirshhorn Museum and Sculpture Garden, Smithsonian Institution, Washington, D.C.
- Scrub (1976); Acrylic on canvas with collage; 72 × 132 in (182.88 × 335.28 cm); National Gallery of Art, Washington, D.C.
- Weighed Anchor (1976); Acrylic on canvas with collage; 84 1/2 × 62 1/4 × 2 1/2 in (214.6 × 158.1 × 6.3 cm)
- Abacus Sliding (1977); Polymer pigment on canvas; 90 1/4 × 120 1/2 × 1 3/4 in (229.2 × 306 × 4.4 cm); Denver Art Museum
- Azure (1977); Acrylic with collage on canvas; 90 × 120 in (228.6 × 304.8 cm); Memphis Brooks Museum of Art, Memphis, Tennessee
- Coffee Thyme (1977); Acrylic and cut canvas on canvas; 90 1/2 × 110 in (229.7 × 279.3 cm); Museum of Modern Art, New York
- Earth Element (1977); Acrylic on canvas with collage; 60 × 84 1/2 × 2 3/8 in (152.4 × 214.6 × 6 cm)
- Firefly Blacktop (1977); Oil and acrylic on canvas; 90 × 120 1/2 in (228.6 × 306 cm); High Museum of Art, Atlanta
- Rail (1977); Acrylic and canvas on canvas; 90 3/4 × 180 3/4 in (230.5 × 459.1 cm); Hirshhorn Museum and Sculpture Garden, Smithsonian Institution, Washington, D.C.
- Station (1977); Acrylic collage on canvas on beveled stretcher; 30 × 30 in (76.2 × 76.2 cm)
- Union (1977); Acrylic on canvas; 55 × 65 1/2 in (139.7 × 166.4 cm); Seattle Art Museum
- Untitled (Black) (1978); Acrylic, yarn, and cut canvas on stained canvas; 89 3/4 × 120 1/2 in (228 × 306.1 cm); Whitney Museum, New York
- Loving Lightly (1978–1979); Acrylic, mixed media, and collage on canvas; 40 × 70 in (101.6 × 177.8 cm); North Carolina Museum of Art, Raleigh, North Carolina
- Cozy (diptych) (1979); Acrylic on canvas; Spelman College Museum of Fine Art, Atlanta
- Leah's Renoir (1979); Acrylic on canvas with collage sections; 80 × 195 in. (203.2 × 495.3 cm); Metropolitan Museum of Art, New York
- Luck (1979); Acrylic on canvas, diptych; Each panel: 80 × 45 in (203.2 × 114.3 cm); Oklahoma City Museum of Art
- Mirror II (1979); Acrylic on shaped canvas; 80 × 80 in (203.2 × 203.2 cm); Phillips Collection, Washington, D.C.
- Of Cities American (1979); Acrylic on canvas; 80 × 140 in (203.2 × 355.6 cm); Virginia Museum of Fine Arts, Richmond, Virginia
- Open Cylinder (1979); Oil on canvas; Part A: 81 × 35 1/2 in (205.7 × 90.2 cm), part B: 80 3/4 × 46 in (205.1 × 116.7 cm); Smithsonian American Art Museum, Washington, D.C.
- Tequila (1979); Acrylic and mixed media on canvas; 40 × 70 × 3 1/8 in (101.6 × 177.8 × 7.9 cm); Cincinnati Art Museum
- Treasures Measures (1979); Acrylic on canvas collage; 40 1/3 × 70 1/2 in (102.5 × 179 cm); Art Gallery of Nova Scotia, Halifax, Nova Scotia

==== 1980s ====
- Brown Reed (c. 1980); Oil on canvas; 78 × 30 in (198.12 × 76.2 cm); Virginia Museum of Fine Arts, Richmond, Virginia
- Architectural Notions for a New Nursery (1980); Acrylic on canvas; 79 × 121 in (200.7 × 207.3 cm)
- Box Cars Grand (1980); Acrylic on cut and layered canvas; Dimensions vary with installation; Patrick V. McNamara Federal Building, Detroit (collection of General Services Administration)
- Irish Spring Here (1980); Acrylic and rhoplex on canvas; 80 × 195 1/2 in (203.2 × 496.57 cm); Madison Museum of Contemporary Art, Madison, Wisconsin
- Patchwork/Terry (1980); Acrylic on canvas; 40 × 34 1/2 × 3 in (101.6 × 87.6 × 7.6 cm); Georgia Museum of Art, Athens, Georgia
- Purpled (1980), from the Chasers series; Acrylic on canvas; 80 × 90 × 4 3/4 in (203.2 × 228.6 × 12.07 cm); Virginia Museum of Fine Arts, Richmond, Virginia
- To Repin, To Repin (1980), from the Chasers series; 79 × 90 7/8 × 3 1/2 in (200.7 × 230.8 × 8.9 cm); Telfair Museums, Savannah, Georgia
- Robbin' Peter (1980); Acrylic on canvas; 80 × 90 in (203.2 × 228.6 cm); San Francisco Museum of Modern Art
- White Sand Isolate (1980); Oil, acrylic, sand on shaped canvas; 80 × 118 in (203.20 × 299.72 cm); George Washington University Art Collection, Washington, D.C.
- The Arc Maker I & II (1981); Acrylic on canvas with collage; Overall: 75 × 213 × 1 1/2 in (190.5 × 541 × 3.8 cm), large panels: 75 × 80 1/4 × 1 1/2 in (190.5 × 203.8 × 3.8 cm) each, narrow panels: 72 1/4 × 26 1/4 × 1 1/2 in (183.5 × 66.7 × 3.8 cm) each; Detroit Institute of Arts
- Cartouche (1981); Acrylic on canvas with collage; 118 1/2 × 83 4/5 × 2 3/10 in (301 × 213 × 6 cm)
- Double Rouge (1981); Acrylic on canvas; 56 × 73 in (142.24 × 185.42 cm); George Washington University Art Collection, Washington, D.C.
- Elm (1981); Acrylic on canvas with collage; 70 × 171 1/4 × 1 1/2 in (178 × 435 × 4 cm)
- Lion's Rock Arc (1981); Acrylic on canvas; 72 1/2 × 190 1/2 in (184.2 × 483.9 cm); Studio Museum in Harlem, New York
- Master Builder Pieces and Eagles (1981); Acrylic on canvas, in four pieces; Overall: 160 × 75 in (406.4 × 190.5 cm), panel A: 75 × 81 in (190.5 × 205.7 cm), panel B: 75 × 25 in (190.5 × 63.5 cm), panel C: 72 × 40 in (182.9 × 101.6 cm), panel D: 73 × 14 in (185.4 × 35.6 cm); Studio Museum in Harlem, New York
- Red & Black (formerly Raven #3 / B #4, Raven #I / Solo #I, Eagle 4/2 / Solo #II, Raven #2 / Eagle 4/1) (1981); Acrylic on canvas with collage; Panel A: 75 1/8 × 40 1/2 in, panel B: 72 × 13 1/4 in, panel C: 75 1/8 × 40 1/2 in, panel D: 72 × 13 1/4 in, panel E: 75 1/8 × 40 1/2 in, panel F: 72 × 13 1/4 in, panel G: 75 1/8 × 40 1/2 in, panel H: 72 × 13 1/4 in, panel I: 72 × 13 1/4 in, panel J: 75 1/8 × 40 1/2 in; Indianapolis Museum of Art
- Rites of Passage (1981); Acrylic on canvas; 39 1/2 × 49 3/4 in (100.33 × 126.36 cm); Castellani Art Museum, Lewiston, New York
- Composition Around Violet (1982); Acrylic and collage on canvas; 52.5 × 44.5 in (133.35 × 113.03 cm); Mint Museum, Charlotte, North Carolina
- Composition for I-75 (1982); Acrylic on shaped canvas; 80 × 80 in (203.2 × 203.2 cm); Spencer Museum of Art, Lawrence, Kansas
- Composition for Louisville (1982); Acrylic on canvas; 80 × 80 in (203.2 × 203.2 cm); University of Louisville Art Collection, Louisville, Kentucky
- The Muse #5 (1982); Acrylic on canvas with collage; 29 9/10 × 72 4/5 × 2 in (76 × 185 × 5 cm)
- The Muse #6 (1982); Acrylic on canvas with collage; 29 9/10 × 72 4/5 × 2 in (76 × 185 × 5 cm)
- Red Vase, Blue Element (1982); Acrylic on canvas; 80 × 80 in (203.2 × 203.2 cm); University of Louisville Art Collection, Louisville, Kentucky
- Rendezvous of the Chauffeurs (1982); Acrylic on canvas; 54 × 83 in (137.2 × 210.8 cm); Dayton Art Institute, Dayton, Ohio
- Screen (1982); Acrylic on canvas; 58 × 66 in (147.3 × 167.6 cm)
- Tholos Revisited VI (1982); Acrylic and canvas on canvas with metal; 39 3/4 × 33 × 2 3/4 in (101 × 84 × 7 cm); David C. Driskell Center, College Park, Maryland
- Tholos Revisited VII (1982); Acrylic and canvas on canvas with metal; 39 3/4 × 33 × 2 3/4 in (101 × 84 × 7 cm)
- Tholos Revisited VIII (1982); Acrylic and canvas on canvas with metal; 39 3/4 × 33 × 2 3/4 in (101 × 84 × 7 cm)
- Tholos Revisited IX (1982); Acrylic and canvas on canvas with metal; 39 3/4 × 33 × 2 3/4 in (101 × 84 × 7 cm)
- Tholos Revisited X (1982); Acrylic and canvas on canvas with metal; 39 3/4 × 33 × 2 3/4 in (101 × 84 × 7 cm)
- Tholos Revisited XI (1982); Acrylic and canvas on canvas with metal; 39 3/4 × 33 × 2 3/4 in (101 × 84 × 7 cm)
- To Braque for Mantelpieces (1982); Acrylic on canvas with collage, enamel on aluminum; 73 × 29 1/2 × 2 in (185.4 × 75 × 5.1 cm); Cleveland Museum of Art
- To Braque and Flowing Birds (1982); Acrylic on canvas with collage, enamel on aluminum; 73 × 29 1/4 × 2 in (185.42 × 74.29 × 5.08 cm)
- To Braque with Cartouché (1982); Acrylic on canvas with collage, enamel on aluminum; 73 × 29 1/4 × 2 in (185.42 × 74.29 × 5.08 cm)
- To Miro - To Birds (1982); Acrylic on canvas with collage; 29 9/10 × 72 4/5 × 2 in (76 × 185 × 5 cm)
- Black (1984); Acrylic polypropylene racked with paint and acrylic hardener on shaped canvas; 55 1/2 × 49 × 10 in (141 × 124.5 × 25.4 cm); Birmingham Museum of Art, Birmingham, Alabama
- Leah's Other Rabbit (1986); Acrylic and enamel on canvas and metal forms; 70 1/2 × 52 × 10 in (179 × 132 x 25.4 cm); Jule Collins Smith Museum of Fine Art, Auburn, Alabama

==== 1990s ====
- Little Rock (1993); Acrylic on canvas; Tubman Museum, Macon, Georgia

==== 2020s ====
- For John Lewis (2020); Acrylic on canvas; 72 × 96 × 3 3/4 in (182.9 × 243.8 × 9.52 cm)
- Any Minute Now (2020); Acrylic on canvas; 96 × 96 × 3 3/4 (243.8 × 243.8 × 9.52 cm)
- Heroines, Beyoncé, Serena and Althea (2020); Acrylic on canvas; 72 × 96 × 3 3/4 in (182.9 × 243.8 × 9.52 cm)
- The Mississippi "Shake Rag" (2020); Acrylic on canvas; 96 × 96 × 3 3/4 (243.8 × 243.8 × 9.52 cm)
- A New Generation (2020); Acrylic on canvas; 72 × 96 × 3 3/4 in (182.9 × 243.8 × 9.52 cm)
- Nikki Giovanni (2020); Acrylic on canvas; 96 × 96 × 3 3/4 (243.8 × 243.8 × 9.52 cm)
- October 18 (2020); Acrylic on canvas; 96 × 240 × 3 3/4 in (243.8 × 609.6 × 9.52 cm)
- Purple Orpheus (2020); Acrylic on canvas; 72 × 96 × 3 3/4 in (182.9 × 243.8 × 9.52 cm)
- They Dance and Sail Away (2020); Acrylic on canvas; 96 × 240 × 3 3/4 in (243.8 × 609.6 × 9.52 cm)
- Waiting for "Dutchman" (2020); Acrylic on canvas; 96 × 96 × 3 3/4 (243.8 × 243.8 × 9.52 cm)
- Aaron's Duchamp (2021); Acrylic, copper chop, aluminum granules, encaustic, paper collage element, sawdust and flocking; 96 × 96 × 4 in (243.8 × 243.8 × 10.8 cm)
- April 5 (2021); Acrylic, aluminum shavings, aluminum, wood, flocking, and sawdust on canvas; 96 × 240 × 4 1/2 in (243.8 × 609.6 × 11.4 cm)
- Brew (2021); Acrylic on canvas; 48 × 48 × 3 1/4 in (121.9 × 121.9 × 8.3 cm)
- Butterflies-Butterflies (2021); Acrylic, copper chop, aluminum granules, tin shot, encaustic medium, sawdust and clocking paper collage on canvas; 72 × 96 × 4 in (182.9 × 243.8 × 10.2 cm)
- Composition for Now (2021); Acrylic on canvas, bevel-edge; 96 × 96 × 4 in (143.9 × 243.8 × 10.2 cm)
- Foggy (2021); Acrylic, aluminum granules, copper chop, sawdust and flocking, encaustic medium, paper collage element on canvas; 96 × 96 × 4 in (243.8 × 243.8 × 10.2 cm)
- For "The Friend" (2021); Acrylic on beveled-edge canvas; 96 × 240 × 4 in (243.8 × 609.6 × 10.2 cm)
- Gold Mine (2021); Acrylic on beveled-edge canvas; 96 × 96 × 4 in (243.8 × 243.8 × 10.2 cm)
- Green Goes (2021); Acrylic on canvas, bevel-edge; 96 × 96 × 3 3/4 in (243.8 × 243.8 × 9.5 cm)
- In Now (2021); Acrylic on canvas, bevel-edge; 48 × 72 × 4 in (121.9 × 182.9 × 10.2 cm)
- Into the Night (2021); Acrylic, tin shot, aluminum granules, copper chop, wood, socks, paper, fabric, flocking, sawdust, and wax on canvas; 96 × 240 × 4 1/2 in (243.8 × 609.6 × 11.4 cm)
- Like Snow (2021); Tin shot, paper collage element, acylic and latex on canvas, marine-ply bevel-edge stretcher; 72 × 72 × 3 3/4 in (182.9 × 182.9 × 9.5 cm)
- Long White Moment (2021); Acrylic with sawdust, wax, mica flake, and aluminum on beveled-edge canvas; 96 × 240 × 4 in (243.8 × 609.6 × 10.2 cm)
- A Lovely Blue And ! (2021); Acrylic and mixed media on canvas; 96 × 240 × 3.75 in (243.8 × 609.6 × 9.5 cm); Johns Hopkins University Bloomberg Center, Washington, D.C.
- Oak, Net and This! (2021); Acrylic with sawdust, flocking, and sand on beveled-edge canvas; 96 × 96 × 4 in (243.8 × 243.8 × 10.2 cm)
- River Walk (2021); Acrylic, tin shot, and wood on canvas; 96 × 96 × 3 1/2 in (243.8 × 243.8 × 8.9 cm)
- Spin and Splash (2021); Acrylic on canvas, bevel-edge; 72 × 72 × 3 3/4 in (182.9 × 182.9 × 9.5 cm)
- Spring Is (2021); Acrylic on canvas, bevel-edge; 72 × 72 × 4 in (182.9 × 182.9 × 10.2 cm)
- Spring This Time (2021); Acrylic on beveled-edge canvas; 96 × 180 × 4 in (243.8 × 4572 × 10.2 cm)
- Sweetheart (2021); Acrylic, aluminum granules, wood, flocking, and sawdust on canvas; 96 × 96 × 3 1/2 in (243.8 × 243.8 × 8.9 cm)
- Team (2021); Acrylic on canvas, bevel-edge; 48 × 72 × 3 3/4 in (121.9 × 182.9 × 9.5 cm)
- Turtle (2021); Acrylic, aluminum granules, wood, flocking, and sawdust on canvas; 96 × 96 × 3 1/2 in (243.8 × 243.8 × 8.9 cm)
- What! (2021); Acrylic with polypropylene on beveled-edge canvas; 96 × 180 × 4 in (243.8 × 4572 × 10.2 cm)
- Arne (2022); Acrylic on beveled-edge canvas; 96 × 96 × 4 in (243.8 × 243.8 × 10.2 cm)
- Beyoncé (2022); Acrylic on beveled-edge canvas; 96 × 96 × 4 in (243.8 × 243.8 × 10.2 cm)
- The Business (2022); Acrylic on beveled-edge canvas; 96 × 96 × 4 in (2438 × 243.8 × 10.2 cm)
- Downpatrick Head (2022);
- Irish, County Mayo (2022); Acrylic with copper chop on beveled-edge canvas; 72 × 60 × 4 in (182.9 × 152.4 × 10.2 cm)
- Lilly (2022); Acrylic with sawdust, encaustic, and polypropylene beveled-edge canvas; 72 × 72 × 6 in (182.9 × 182.9 × 15.2 cm), Art Bridges Foundation, Bentonville, Arkansas
- Nina's Buffalo (2022); Acrylic on beveled-edge canvas; 96 × 180 × 4 in (243.8 × 457.2 × 10.2 cm)
- Up Sally (2022); Acrylic with sawdust, flocking, and sand on beveled-edge canvas; 96 × 96 × 4 in (243.8 × 243.8 × 10.2 cm)

=== Painted metal, plastic, wood, and mixed media ===
Includes works with painted canvas collaged or mounted to metal, plastic, or wood, as well as freestanding or wall-based 3-dimensional painted constructions of all sizes, stained wood sculptures, and mosaic tile work. One work on this list - Library Stars/Library Obelisk - comprises an unpainted, patinated metal sculpture.

==== 1960s ====
- Jail Jungle I (1968); Mixed media; 78 × 38 × 9 in (198.1 × 96.5 × 22.9 cm)
- Jail Jungle II (1968); Mixed media; 78 × 38 × 9 in (198.1 × 96.5 × 22.9 cm)
- Jail Jungle III (1968); Mixed media; 78 × 38 × 9 in (198.1 × 96.5 × 22.9 cm)

==== 1970s ====
- Composed (formerly Dark as I Am) (1968–1974); Acrylic, clothing, backpack, painter's tools, wooden closet pole on wood door; 87 × 47 × 3 1/2 in (221 × 119.4 × 8.9 cm); Menil Collection, Houston

==== 1980s ====
- Round Work (1980); Painted metal, canvas; 50 × 35 × 10 in (127 × 88.9 × 25.4 cm); High Museum of Art, Atlanta
- Sculpture with a D (1980–1983); Painted aluminum; 187 × 538 in (474.98 × 1366.52 cm); Davis station, Massachusetts Bay Transportation Authority, Boston
- Pantheon II (1983); Acrylic on canvas and polyurethane enamel on aluminum; 81 × 58 1/4 in (205.8 × 148 cm); Blanton Museum of Art, Austin, Texas
- Plantagenets Golden (1984); Acrylic on canvas and enamel on aluminum; 56 1/2 × 68 × 4 1/8 in (143.51 × 172.72 × 10.48 cm)
- The Saint of Moritz Outside Mondrian (1984); Acrylic on canvas and metal; 59 × 63 1/2 × 5 in (149.9 × 161.3 × 12.7 cm), Menil Collection, Houston
- On the Back of the Wind (1985); Acrylic on canvas on aluminum; 57 × 57 in (145 × 145 cm); Museum of Fine Arts, Budapest
- Procession for a Princess (1986); Acrylic on canvas and acrylic and enamel on aluminum; 91 × 109 × 16 in (231.14 × 276.86 × 40.64 cm)
- Solar Canopy (1986); Painted aluminum; York College, City University of New York
- Streak of Lightning (1986); Acrylic, enamel, and metal on canvas; 68 × 89 in (172.7 × 226.1 cm)
- Uguisu (1986); Acrylic on canvas on board plus aluminum sculptural pieces; 101 1/2 × 134 × 9 in (257.81 × 340.36 × 22.86 cm); George Washington University Art Collection, Washington, D.C.
- New River Rises (1987); Acrylic on canvas and acrylic enamel on aluminum; Broward County Cultural Division, Broward County, Florida
- Red Hot New Haven (1987); Acrylic on canvas and acrylic and enamel on aluminum; 72 7/8 × 52 3/4 × 9 3/4 in (185.1 × 134.0 × 24.8 cm); Smithsonian American Art Museum, Washington, D.C.
- Ain't More Than Music (1988); Acrylic on canvas and acrylic and enamel on aluminum; 60 × 62 × 15 1/4 in (152.4 × 157.48 × 38.73 cm)
- Buena Vista (1988); Acrylic on canvas mounted on panel with anodized aluminum frame; 26 5/16 × 26 3/8 in (66.8 × 67.1 cm); Museum of Fine Arts, Houston
- Sparta (1988); Acrylic on canvas with epoxy enamel on aluminum; Diameter: 42 1/2 in (108 cm); Museum of Fine Arts, Boston
- Untitled (1988); Acrylic on canvas and metal, mounted to plywood; 28 1/4 × 30 1/4 × 10 1/4 in (71.76 × 76.84 × 26.04 cm); Virginia Museum of Fine Arts, Richmond, Virginia
- Fine as a Cobweb (1989); Acrylic on canvas and primed aluminum, with plywood support structure; 60 × 61 × 17 in (152.4 × 154.94 × 43.18 cm); Pennsylvania Academy of the Fine Arts, Philadelphia
- The Generation Below Them (1989); Acrylic on canvas and primed aluminum and plywood; 80 × 96 × 13 in (203.2 × 243.84 × 33.02 cm); Chazen Museum of Art, Madison, Wisconsin
- Waking Up (1989); Acrylic on canvas and enamel on aluminum with plywood support structure; 72 × 95 × 12 in (182.88 × 241.3 × 30.48 cm)

==== 1990s ====
- The Petition (1990); Mixed media, assembled; 96 × 60 × 32 in (243.8 × 152.4 × 81.3 cm); Smithsonian American Art Museum, Washington, D.C.
- With Violet (1990); Acrylic on canvas and acrylic and enamel on aluminum; 54 × 66 × 14 in (137.2 × 167.6 × 35.6 cm)
- Yellow Light Ellison (1990); Mixed media; Sidwell Friends School, Washington, D.C.
- Jamaica Center Station Riders, Blue (1991); Painted aluminum; Jamaica Center–Parsons/Archer station, Metropolitan Transportation Authority, New York
- Northwest Wind (1992); Acrylic on synthetic fabric mounted on wood; 30 × 63 in (76.2 × 160 cm); Studio Museum in Harlem, New York
- The Awning Set (1992–1993); Mixed media; Studio Museum in Harlem, New York
- Higher Windows (1992–1993); Acrylic on polypropylene on birch plywood construction; 88 × 47 in (223.52 × 119.38 cm); Smith College Museum of Art, Northampton, Massachusetts
- Uli Montage (1992–1993); Acrylic on polypropylene on birch plywood construction; 88 × 44 in (223.52 × 111.76 cm); Smith College Museum of Art, Northampton, Massachusetts
- You Come Flying (1992–1993); Acrylic on polypropylene on birch plywood construction; 88 × 45 in (223.52 × 114.3 cm); Smith College Museum of Art, Northampton, Massachusetts
- Folded Cottage I (1993); Acrylic & collage on synthetic fabric on polypropylene; 38 × 9 1/4 in (96.5 × 23.5 cm); Ballinglen Arts Foundation, Ballycastle, County Mayo, Ireland
- Folded Cottage III (1993); Acrylic & collage on synthetic fabric on polypropylene; 37 × 14 1/2 in (94 × 37 cm); Ballinglen Arts Foundation, Ballycastle, County Mayo, Ireland
- Folded Cottage IV (1993); Acrylic & collage on synthetic fabric on polypropylene; 39 × 13 in (99.1 × 33 cm); Ballinglen Arts Foundation, Ballycastle, County Mayo, Ireland
- Back-Lit Awning (Bikers Move Like Swallows) (1994); Acrylic on polypropylene and birch plywood construction with aluminum frames; 69 1/4 × 94 1/2 in (175.89 × 240.03 cm)
- Level One (1994); Acrylic on board; 24 × 48 × 2 in (61 × 121.9 × 5.1 cm); Hirshhorn Museum and Sculpture Garden, Smithsonian Institution, Washington, D.C.
- Reading Across (1994); Mixed media on board; 48 × 48 in (121.9 × 121.9 cm)
- Blankets of Fir (1995); Mixed media; 26 3/4 × 35 1/2 in (67.94 × 90.17 cm); James E. Lewis Museum of Art, Morgan State University, Baltimore
- Scarcely Blue (1995); Acrylic on moveable wood panels; 31 × 47 × 3 in (78.74 × 119.38 × 7.62 cm); David C. Driskell Center, College Park, Maryland
- Black and Golden Door (1996); Acrylic on birch plywood with aluminum construction and piano-hinged door; 35 3/4 × 35 7/8 × 1 1/2 in (90.8 × 91.1 × 3.8 cm); Crystal Bridges Museum of American Art, Bentonville, Arkansas
- Easy Siders Series (1996); Mixed media on handmade paper and polypropylene mounted to birch plywood; 47 × 48 in (119.38 × 121.92 cm); Phillips Collection, Washington, D.C.
- Gondola (1996); Acrylic on polypropylene and birch plywood construction with piano hinges; 68 × 105 × 21 7/8 in (172.72 × 266.7 × 55.56 cm)
- Reds, Towering Stack (1996); 60 × 30 × 4 in (152.4 × 76.2 × 10.1 cm); Lauren Rogers Museum of Art, Laurel, Mississippi
- Electric (1997); Acrylic on wood; 47 1/2 × 47 1/2 × 8 1/2 in (120.7 × 120.7 × 21.6 cm); Telfair Museums, Savannah, Georgia
- Fishing Well (1997); Acrylic on birch; 94 × 48 1/2 in (238.8 × 123.2 cm); Memorial Art Gallery, Rochester, New York
- Steps and Folds (1997); Acrylic on wood panel; 57 × 48 × 4 in (144.8 × 121.9 × 10.2 cm); DC Commission on the Arts and Humanities, Washington, D.C.
- A and the Kitty (1998); Acrylic on birch plywood construction; 72 × 90 × 47 1/2 in (182.88 × 228.6 × 120.65 cm)
- Beam (1998); Acrylic and paper on birch plywood with hinges; 96 × 24 × 10 in (243.8 × 60.9 × 25.4 cm); Kreeger Museum, Washington, D.C.
- Color of Medals (1998); Acrylic, polypropylene, aluminum, and computer scanned images on plywood; 214 × 118 × 24 in (543.6 × 299.7 × 61 cm); United States Department of Veterans Affairs Regional Office, Philadelphia (collection of General Services Administration)
- Daily Red (1998); Acrylic on wood and metal; 86 1/4 × 52 3/8 × 12 3/16 in (219 × 133 × 31 cm); Anacostia Community Museum, Smithsonian Institution, Washington, D.C.
- Graining (1998); Acrylic and paper on birch plywood with hinges; 89 × 46 1/2 × 12 in (226 × 118.11 × 30.48 cm); Kreeger Museum, Washington, D.C.
- Rainbows Near (1998); Acrylic on sculptured wood panels; 29 3/4 × 72 in (75.57 × 182.88 cm); National Gallery of Art, Washington, D.C.
- The Real Blue (1998); Acrylic on birch plywood; 4 parts; University of Michigan School of Social Work Art Collection, Ann Arbor, Michigan
- Red (1999); Acrylic on birch plywood construction with aluminum frame; 50 1/4 × 75 × 3 in (127.63 × 190.5 × 7.62 cm)
- The Three Muses (1999); Acrylic paint, digital and laser prints, birch plywood, and piano hinges; 144 × 192 in (365.76 × 487.68 cm) overall, 3 parts; University of Cincinnati Art Collection
- Water Tower II (1999); Acrylic on birch with piano hinge; 24 × 39 1/2 × 3 in (61 × 100.3 × 7.6 cm)
- Wave and Canal (1999); Acrylic on birch; 43 × 36 1/2 in (109.22 × 92.71 cm)

==== 2000s ====
- Library Stars/Library Obelisk (2000); Patinated copper; 19 5/8 × 5 5/8 ft, 2 in (597.4 × 170.7 × 5.1 cm); Juanita E. Thornton/Shepherd Park Neighborhood Library, Washington, D.C. (collection of DC Commission on the Arts and Humanities)
- Ruby and Ossie (2000); Acrylic on plywood with metal hardware; 58 1/2 × 23 1/2 × 10 in (148.6 × 59.7 × 25.4 cm); Saint Louis Art Museum
- Fire on Water V (2003); Acrylic on birch, with piano hinges, triptych; 14 × 27 1/4 in (35.56 × 69.21 cm)
- On the Canal (2003); Acrylic on birch plywood construction; 72 × 16 1/2 × 4 in (182.88 × 41.91 × 10.16 cm)
- On the Canal With Blue (2003); Acrylic on birch plywood construction; 72 × 16 1/2 × 4 in (182.88 × 41.91 × 10.16 cm)
- On Yellow Wood (2003); Acrylic on birch plywood construction; 47 1/2 × 23 1/4 × 2 5/8 in (120.65 × 59.05 × 6.67 cm)
- Red Slatt (2003); Acrylic on birch plywood construction; 47 1/2 × 23 1/4 × 2 5/8 in (120.65 × 59.05 × 6.67 cm)
- Second Blue Slatt (2003); Acrylic on birch plywood construction; 34 3/4 × 22 1/4 × 2 5/8 in (88.26 × 56.51 × 6.67 cm)
- Second Red Slatt (2003); Acrylic on birch plywood construction; 35 3/4 × 23 1/4 × 2 5/8 in (90.8 × 59.05 × 6.67 cm)
- Birds Not Flying (2005); Acrylic on birch with piano hinges; 53.25 × 48.5 × 2.75 (135.26 × 123.19 × 6.99 cm); Mississippi Museum of Art, Jackson, Mississippi
- Census (2007); Acrylic on birch plywood; 183 × 139 1/4 × 24 in (464.8 × 353.7 × 61 cm); United States Census Bureau Headquarters, Suitland, Maryland (collection of General Services Administration)
- Seeds (2007); Acrylic on birch; 49 × 33 × 2 3/4 in
- Element (2008); Acrylic on birch; 49 1/2 × 36 in (125.73 × 91.44 cm); Allentown Art Museum, Allentown, Pennsylvania
- Repeating Green Slice (2008); Acrylic on birch; 49 3/4 × 36 × 3 1/4 in (126.36 × 91.44 × 8.25 cm)
- River Falls (2008); Acrylic on birch; 44 × 50 × 3 1/2 in (111.76 × 127 × 8.89 cm)
- Wide (2008); Acrylic on birch; 47 × 46 × 5 in (119.38 × 116.84 × 12.7 cm)
- Blue (2009); Acrylic on birch plywood; 16 × 12 1/4 in (40.64 × 31.115 cm); Pennsylvania Academy of the Fine Arts, Philadelphia

==== 2010s ====
- Melody (2010); Acrylic on birch; 83 × 32 in (210.8 × 81.3 cm)
- Nite II (2010); Acrylic on birch; 30 × 17 1/2 in (76.2 × 44.45 cm)
- Nite III (2010); Acrylic on birch; 30 × 17 1/2 in (76.2 × 44.45 cm)
- From Model to Rainbow (2011); Glass mosaic mounted on Aerolam panels; 168 × 468 in (427 × 1188 cm); Takoma station, Washington Metropolitan Area Transit Authority
- Screen for Models I, II, III (2012); Acrylic on birch; Panel I: 80 × 45 in (203.2 cm × 114.3 cm), panel II: 80 × 36 1/2 in (203.2 cm × 92.7 cm), panel III: 80 × 45 in (203.2 cm × 114.3 cm)
- Yet Do I Marvel (Countee Cullen) (2016); Acrylic on birch; Overall: 96 × 258 × 4 1/2 in (243.8 × 655.3 × 11.4 cm), each panel: 96 × 48 × 4 1/2 in (243.8 × 121.9 × 11.4 cm); National Museum of African American History and Culture, Smithsonian Institution, Washington, D.C.
- Homage to the Square (2016–2017); Acrylic on wood, four parts; Overall: 122 × 122 × 3 3/8 in (310 × 310 × 9 cm)
- Aaron (2017); Acrylic on wood, four parts; Overall: 98 1/4 × 98 1/4 × 3 1/2 in (250 × 250 × 9 cm)
- First Half (2017); Acrylic on wood; 60 1/4 × 60 1/4 × 3 3/8 in (153 × 153 × 8.6 cm)
- Into the Woods (2017); Acrylic on wood; 59 3/4 × 44 3/4 in (151.8 × 113.7 cm); Memorial Art Gallery, Rochester, New York

==== 2020s ====
- Black Mozart/ ORNETTE (2020); Wood, aluminum, die-stain, lacquer; 96 × 96 × 2 1/4 in (243.8 × 243.8 × 5.7 cm)
- Black 48" Square (2020); Wood, aluminum, die-stain, lacquer; Ed. of 8 (variable); 48 × 48 in (121.9 × 121.9 × 5.7 cm)
- Black 60" Disc (2020); Wood, aluminum, die-stain, lacquer; Ed. of 3 (variable); 60 × 60 × 2 1/4 in (152.4 × 152.4 × 5.7 cm)
- Blue 96" Disc (2020); Wood, aluminum, die-stain, lacquer; 96 × 96 × 2 1/4 in (243.8 × 243.8 × 5.7 cm)
- Color Abacus (2020); Wood, aluminum, die-stain, lacquer; Ed. of 4 (variable); 12 × 22 × 5 in (30.4 × 55.8 × 12.7 cm)
- Five Pyramids (2020); Wood, aluminum, die-stain, lacquer; Five parts, each: 36 1/4 × 48 × 48 in (92 × 121.9 × 121.9 cm), overall dimensions vary with installation
- Mastaba (In Two Parts) (2020); Wood, aluminum, die-stain, lacquer; 54 × 114 × 61 in (137.1 × 289.5 × 154.9 cm)
- Pyramid (2020); Wood, aluminum, die-stain, lacquer; 110 × 122 × 122 in (279.4 × 309.8 × 309.8 cm)
- Three White Pyramids (2020); Wood, aluminum, die-stain, lacquer; Ed. of 5 sculptures (variable); Three parts, each 36 1/4 × 48 × 48 in (92 × 121.9 × 121.9 cm), overall dimensions vary with installation
- White Abacus (2020); Wood, aluminum, die-stain, lacquer; Ed. of 4 (variable); 12 × 22 × 5 in (30.4 × 55.8 × 12.7 cm)
- White 48" Disc (2020); Wood, aluminum, die-stain, lacquer; Ed. of 4 (variable); 48 × 48 in (121.9 × 121.9 × 5.7 cm)
- White 96" Disc (2020); Wood, aluminum, die-stain, lacquer; 96 × 96 × 2 1/4 in (243.8 × 243.8 × 5.7 cm)
- The Amazing Kite (2021); Acrylic and mixed media on panel in beveled frame; 36 × 36 × 4 in (91.4 × 91.4 × 10.2 cm)
- A Kind of Love (2021); Acrylic, sawdust, encaustic on wood panel, mounted in wood frame; 60 × 60 × 40 in (152.4 × 152.4 × 10.2 cm)
- Exciting (2021); Acrylic and mixed media on panel in beveled frame; 48 × 48 × 4 in (121.9 × 121.9 × 10.2 cm)
- Lucky (2021); Acrylic with tin, copper, encaustic, sawdust, and aluminum on wood ply panel in beveled-edge frame; 60 × 60 × 4 in (152.4 × 152.4 × 10.2 cm)
- Moon Tide (2021); Acrylic, sawdust, encaustic, on wood panel, mounted in wood frame; 60 × 60 × 40 in (152.4 × 152.4 × 10.2 cm)
- Pretty Baby (2021); Acrylic and mixed media on panel in beveled frame; 36 × 36 × 4 in (91.4 × 91.4 × 10.2 cm)
- Red Clouds (2021); Acrylic and mixed media on panel in beveled frame; 60 × 60 × in (152.4 × 152.4 × 10.2 cm)
- Something is Going On! (2021); Acrylic and mixed media on panel in beveled frame; 60 × 60 × 4 in (152.4 × 152.4 × 10.2 cm)
- A Sunday Kind of Love (2021); Acrylic, sawdust, encaustic on wood panel, mounted in wood frame; 60 × 60 × 40 in (152.4 × 152.4 × 10.2 cm)
- X for X (2021); Acrylic and mixed media on panel in beveled frame; 48 × 48 × 4 in (121.9 × 121.9 × 10.2 cm)
- X Red Cloud (2021); Acrylic and mixed media on panel in beveled frame; 48 × 48 × 4 in (121.9 × 121.9 × 10.2 cm)
- You Blue Moon (2021); Acrylic and mixed media on panel in beveled frame; 60 × 60 × 4 in (152.4 × 152.4 × 10.2 cm)
- Untitled (2022); Acrylic and mixed media on wood panel in aluminum frame; 72 × 72 in (182.9 × 182.9 cm)
- Untitled (2022); Acrylic and mixed media on wood panel in aluminum frame; 72 × 72 in (182.9 × 182.9 cm)
- Untitled (2022); Acrylic and mixed media on wood panel in aluminum frame; 72 × 72 in (182.9 × 182.9 cm)
- Untitled (2022); Acrylic and mixed media on wood panel in aluminum frame; 68 × 68 in (172.7 × 172.7 cm)
- Untitled (2022); Acrylic and mixed media on wood panel in aluminum frame; 68 × 68 in (172.7 × 172.7 cm)

=== Paintings and drawings on paper ===
Includes framed or unframed, and mounted or unmounted paintings on paper

==== 1960s ====
- Slowly Emerging (1960); Ink wash drawing; 16 1/4 × 13 3/4 in (41.27 × 34.92 cm)
- Still Life (1960); Watercolor on paper; 5 5/8 × 9 3/8 in (14.29 × 23.81 cm)
- Woman in Hat (1960); Watercolor on paper; 10 1/2 × 4 1/2 in (26.67 × 11.43 cm)
- Bridge (1962); Watercolor on paper; 12 × 18 in (30.48 × 45.72 cm)
- Chair Group (1962); Ink wash drawing; 16 5/8 × 13 7/8 in (42.23 × 35.24 cm)
- Seated Woman (1962); Watercolor on paper; 14 7/8 × 10 7/8 in (37.78 × 27.62 cm)
- Morning Study (1963); Ink wash drawing; 15 3/4 × 11 7/8 in (40 × 30.16 cm)
- Park Invention I (1963); Watercolor on paper; 5 3/4 × 8 3/4 in (14.6 × 22.22 cm)
- Park Invention II (1963); Watercolor on paper; 5 3/4 × 8 3/4 in (14.6 × 22.22 cm)
- Park Invention III (1963); Watercolor on paper; 8 3/4 × 5 3/4 in (22.22 × 14.6 cm)
- Stephanie (1963); Crayon drawing; 18 × 24 in (45.72 × 60.96 cm)
- Untitled (1963); Watercolor on paper; 5 3/4 × 8 3/4 in (14.6 × 22.2 cm); Baltimore Museum of Art
- Untitled (1964–1965); Watercolor on paper; 11 × 15 in (27.94 × 38.1 cm)
- Untitled (1966); Watercolor on paper; 7 × 10 1/2 in (17.78 × 26.67 cm)
- Untitled (1966); Watercolor on paper; 24 × 19 in (60.96 × 48.26 cm)
- Untitled (c 1967); Watercolor on handmade paper; 21 1/16 × 25 in (53.5 × 63.5 cm); Allen Memorial Art Museum, Oberlin, Ohio
- Green Slice (1967); Watercolor on Japanese paper; 38 × 23 in (96.52 × 58.42 cm); San Francisco Museum of Modern Art
- Least Rivers (1967); Watercolor on Japanese paper; 38 × 23 in (96.52 × 58.42 cm); San Francisco Museum of Modern Art
- Shift (1967); Stained and folded rice paper; 38 1/2 × 24 in (97.8 × 61 cm); Allen Memorial Art Museum, Oberlin, Ohio
- Untitled (1967); Watercolor on paper; 18 1/4 × 23 3/4 in (46.4 × 60.3 cm)
- Untitled (1967); Watercolor on rice paper; 9 3/4 × 9 3/4 in (24.76 × 24.76 cm)
- Untitled (from Rock Creek series) (1967); Watercolor on paper; 5 3/8 × 8 1/2 in (13.7 × 21.6 cm)
- Untitled (from Rock Creek series) (1967); Watercolor on paper; 8 1/2 × 5 1/2 in (21.6 × 14 cm)
- Untitled (from Rock Creek series) (1967); Watercolor on paper; 8 1/2 × 5 3/8 in (21.6 × 13.7 cm)
- Untitled (from Rock Creek series) (1967); Watercolor on paper; 8 1/2 × 5 in (21.6 × 12.7 cm)
- Untitled (from Rock Creek series) (1967); Watercolor on paper; 8 1/2 × 5 in (21.6 × 12.7 cm)
- Untitled (from Rock Creek series) (1967); Watercolor on paper; 8 1/2 × 5 1/2 in (21.6 × 14 cm)
- Untitled (from Rock Creek series) (1967); Watercolor on paper; 5 1/2 × 8 1/2 in (14 × 21.6 cm)
- Untitled (1968); Watercolor and acrylic on paper; 8 1/8 × 23 5/8 in (46.1 × 60.0 cm); Smithsonian American Art Museum, Washington, D.C.
- Untitled (1968); Watercolor on paper; 23 3/4 × 18 1/8 in (60.3 × 46 cm); Hammer Museum, Los Angeles
- Untitled (1968); Watercolor on paper; 23 3/4 × 18 1/8 in (60.3 × 46 cm)
- Untitled (1968); Watercolor on paper; 23 11/16 × 18 in (60.2 × 45.7 cm); Palmer Museum of Art, State College, Pennsylvania
- Untitled (1968); Watercolor on paper; 17 1/2 × 13 7/8 in (44.5 × 35.2 cm); Newark Museum of Art, Newark, New Jersey
- Untitled (1968); Watercolor on fiberglass paper; 18 × 23 5/8 in (45.72 × 60 cm)
- Untitled (1968); Watercolor on fiberglass paper; 23 5/8 × 18 in (60 × 45.72 cm)
- Untitled (1968); Watercolor on fiberglass paper; 23 5/8 × 18 in (60 × 45.72 cm)
- Untitled (1965–1969); Mixed media with watercolor on paper; 24 × 19 in (61 × 48.3 cm); Studio Museum in Harlem, New York
- Combustion (1969); Ink drawing; 23 × 29 in (58.42 × 73.66 cm)
- Watercolor, 4 (1969); Watercolor and aluminum powder on fiberglass paper; 23 3/4 × 18 1/8 in (60.3 × 45.9 cm); Museum of Modern Art, New York
- Untitled (1969); Watercolor stain and metallic pigment on paper; 18 × 23 1/2 in (45.7 × 59.7 cm); Birmingham Museum of Art, Birmingham, Alabama
- Untitled (1969); Brush and black ink, acrylic, and metallic paint with string on Strathmore wove paper; 22 15/16 × 29 1/16 in (58.26 × 73.82 cm); National Gallery of Art, Washington, D.C.
- Untitled (1969); Brush with black and red ink on wove paper; 22 15/16 × 29 1/16 in (58.26 × 73.82 cm), National Gallery of Art, Washington, D.C.
- Untitled (1969); Watercolor on paper; 17 3/4 × 14 in (45.1 × 35.6 cm); Studio Museum in Harlem, New York
- Untitled (1969); Dyes, opaque water-based paint and metallic powder on thick white wove paper; 22 × 28 1/2 in (55.9 × 72.4 cm); Harvard Art Museums, Cambridge, Massachusetts
- Untitled (1969); Ink and wash on paper; 29 × 23 in (73.7 × 58.4 cm)
- Untitled (1969); Ink and wash on paper; 23 × 29 in (58.4 × 73.7 cm)
- Untitled (1969); Ink and wash on paper; 23 × 29 in (58.4 × 73.7 cm)
- Untitled (1969); Ink and wash on paper; 23 × 29 in (58.4 × 73.7 cm)
- Untitled [Orange Abstraction] (1969); Watercolor on folded paper; 16 × 13 1/2 in (40.64 × 34.29 cm); Pennsylvania Academy of the Fine Arts, Philadelphia
- Untitled (c. late 1960s–c. late 1970s); Mixed media on paper; 23 1/2 × 18 in. (59.7 × 45.7 cm)

==== 1970s ====
- Abstraction (1970); Colored inks, with touches of silver metallic paint, on fabric; 17 15/16 × 23 7/16 in (45.5 × 59.5 cm); Art Institute of Chicago
- Frederick (1970); Watercolor on fiberglass paper; 13.5 × 10.5 in (34.29 × 26.67 cm); Lauren Rogers Museum of Art, Laurel, Mississippi
- Untitled (1970); Watercolor on paper; 35 1/2 × 23 3/4 in (90.2 × 60.3 cm); North Carolina Museum of Art, Raleigh, North Carolina
- Untitled (1970); Watercolor on fiberglass paper; 17 1/2 × 13 3/4 in (44.45 × 34.92 cm)
- Untitled (1970); Acrylic on paper; 13 15/16 × 17 7/16 in (35.4 × 44.3 cm); Allen Memorial Art Museum, Oberlin, Ohio
- Untitled (1970); Stained paper; 24.8 × 32.87 in (63 × 83.5 cm); Irish Museum of Modern Art, Dublin
- Untitled (1970); Watercolor on paper; 13 3/4 × 17 1/2 in (34.9 × 44.5 cm)
- Untitled (1970); Watercolor on paper; 28 7/8 × 22 3/4 in (73.3 × 57.8 cm)
- Untitled (1971); Paint on paper; 13 1/2 × 13 1/2 in (34.29 × 34.29 cm) [irreg.]; George Washington University Art Collection, Washington, D.C.
- Untitled (1971); Mixed media, watercolor, pastel, and crayon on paper; 24 1/2 × 32 1/4 in (62.23 × 81.92 cm); University of Michigan Museum of Art, Ann Arbor, Michigan
- Untitled (1971); Watercolor on handmade paper with varnish; 20 3/8 × 26 1/2 in (51.8 × 67.3 cm); National Gallery of Art, Washington, D.C.
- Untitled (1971); Watercolor, acrylic, and metallic paint on altered paper; 35 1/2 × 25 in (90.17 × 63.5 cm) [irreg.]; Minneapolis Institute of Art
- Untitled (1971); Dye stain on mulberry paper; 20 5/8 × 26 3/8 in (52.4 × 67.1 cm); Museum of Modern Art, New York
- (Untitled) (1971); Watercolor on paper; 13 7/8 × 18 in (35.2 × 45.6 cm); Smithsonian American Art Museum, Washington, D.C.
- Untitled (1971); Watercolor on handmade paper; 25 1/2 × 20 in (64.8 × 50.8 cm); Williams College Museum of Art, Williamstown, Massachusetts
- Untitled (1971); Watercolor on fiberglass paper; 17 1/4 × 13 3/4 in (43.8 × 35 cm); Hood Museum of Art, Hanover, New Hampshire
- Untitled #9 (1971); Watercolor on crumpled rice paper; 21 3/4 × 13 5/8 in (55.24 × 34.61 cm)
- Untitled (1972); Watercolor on crumpled rice paper; 22 1/4 × 19 1/2 in (56.51 × 49.53 cm)
- Untitled (1972); Watercolor on crumpled fiberglass paper; 13 1/2 × 17 1/4 in (34.29 × 43.81 cm)
- Untitled (1971–1973); Watercolor and aluminum powder on crumpled nonwoven viscose rayon; 33 1/4 × 23 1/2 in (84.46 × 59.69 cm) [irreg.]; National Gallery of Art, Washington, D.C.
- Untitled (1973); Acrylic on polypropylene; 60 × 93 in (152.4 × 236.2 cm); Seattle Art Museum
- Untitled (1973); Acrylic on polypropylene; 60 × 93 in (152.4 × 236.2 cm); Seattle Art Museum
- Untitled (1973); Acrylic on polypropylene; 60 × 93 in (152.4 × 236.2 cm); Seattle Art Museum
- Untitled (1973); Acrylic on polypropylene; 60 × 93 in (152.4 × 236.2 cm); Seattle Art Museum
- April 2 (1974); Watercolor, acrylic, fabric dye on fiberglass paper; 29 1/16 × 38 1/4 in (73.82 × 97.15 cm)
- Furnace '74 (1974); Watercolor and acrylic with dyes on polypropylene paper; 30 × 42 1/2 in (76.2 × 108 cm); Georgia Museum of Art, Athens, Georgia
- Mars I (1974); Acrylic on rice paper; 21 × 25 1/2 × 5/8 in (53.3 × 64.8 × 1.6 cm); Studio Museum in Harlem, New York
- Mellow 3 (1974); Acrylic on paper; 21 1/16 × 25 7/8 in (53.5 × 65.7 cm) [irreg.]; Cincinnati Art Museum
- Only (1974); Acrylic, watercolor, fabric dye on crumpled rice paper; 19 3/4 × 23 3/4 in (50.16 × 60.32 cm)
- Untitled (1974); Acrylic on paper; 29 1/4 × 41 1/4 in (74.3 × 104.8 cm); Georgia Museum of Art, Athens, Georgia
- Untitled (1972–1975); Watercolor on paper; 14 1/4 × 12 5/8 × 1 in (36.2 × 32.1 × 2.5 cm); Eskenazi Museum of Art, Bloomington, Indiana
- American Quilt No. 20 (1975); Handmade paper with fabrics and buttons; 16 3/4 × 21 3/8 in (42.54 × 54.29 cm)
- American Quilt No. 28 (1975); Quilt collage and acrylic washes on handmade paper; 16 1/2 × 18 3/4 in (41.91 × 47.625 cm); Phillips Collection, Washington, D.C.
- Hold (1975); Acrylic, watercolor, fabric dye on crumpled rice paper; 19 3/4 × 25 1/2 in (50.16 × 64.77 cm)
- Strip II (c. 1976); Aniline dye on rice paper; 21 × 27 in (53.3 × 68.6 cm); Chrysler Museum of Art, Norfolk, Virginia
- N°1 D (1977); Gouache on crumpled paper; 20.87 × 25.59 in (53 × 65 cm); Musée d'Art Moderne de Paris
- Sparta (1977); Watercolor with acrylic on shaped Japanese paper; 10 1/4 × 18 3/4 × 3 in (26 × 47.6 × 7.6 cm); University Museum of Contemporary Art, University of Massachusetts Amherst

==== 1980s ====
- Arrowhead (1980); Acrylic on handformed paper, artist's frame; 38 3/16 × 32 1/16 × 1 15/16 in (97 × 81.5 × 5 cm); Princeton University Art Museum, Princeton, New Jersey

==== 1990s ====
- Untitled (1991); Oil on Japanese paper; 22 5/16 × 32 3/8 in (56.6 × 82.2 cm); Cleveland Museum of Art

==== 2010s ====
- Rock and Shore (2010); Acrylic on paper; 3 15/16 × 3 7/8 in (10 × 9.8 cm); Palmer Museum of Art, State College, Pennsylvania
- Fold XII (2014); Pigment-based ink on handmade paper; 27.75 × 45.75 in (70.48 × 116.2 cm); Tufts University Art Collection, Grafton, Massachusetts
- B Series 10 (2015); Pigment-based ink on handmade paper; 57.0 × 30.0 in (144.8 × 76.2 cm)
- Panel III (2015); Pigment-based ink on handmade paper; 45.5 × 27.5 in (115.6 × 69.8 cm)
- Solstice VII (2016); Watercolor on rice paper; 76.3 × 41.6 × 1.5 in (193.7 × 105.7 × 3.8 cm)
- Untitled (2016); Watercolor on paper; 72 × 38 in (182.9 × 96.5 cm)
- Untitled (2016); Watercolor on rice paper; 60.0 × 31.3 × 1.3 in (152.4 × 79.4 × 3.2 cm)
- Untitled (2017); Watercolor on rice paper; 33.3 × 60.0 × 1.5 in (84.5 × 152.4 × 3.8 cm)
- Untitled (2017); Watercolor on rice paper; 60.0 × 33.0 × 1.5 in (152.4 × 83.8 × 3.8 cm)
- Construct (2018); Watercolor on handmade Japanese paper; 70 in × 34 in (177.8 cm × 86.36 cm); Phillips Collection, Washington, D.C.
- Untitled (2019); Watercolor and acrylic on Washi; 76.4 × 42.1 × 1.5 (194.0 × 107.0 × 3.8 cm)
- Untitled (2019); Watercolor and acrylic on Washi; 73 × 38 1/2 in (185.4 × 97.8 cm); Menil Collection, Houston
- Untitled (2019); Watercolor on paper; 73 × 38 in (185.4 × 96.5 cm); Museum of Modern Art, New York
- Untitled (2019); Watercolor on paper; 73 × 38 in (185.4 × 96.5 cm); Museum of Modern Art, New York

==== 2020s ====
- Untitled (2020); Watercolor on washi; 39 1/2 × 71 1/2 in (100.3 × 181.6 cm)
- Untitled (2020); Watercolor on washi; 71 1/2 × 39 1/2 in (181.6 × 100.3 cm)
- Untitled (2020); Watercolor on washi; 71 1/2 × 39 1/2 in (181.6 × 100.3 cm)
- Washi Paper - Blue (2020); Acrylic on washi; 79 × 79 in (200.6 × 200.6 cm)
- Washi Paper - Blue V (2020); Acrylic on washi; 38 5/8 × 38 5/8 in (98.1 × 98.1 cm)
- Washi Paper - Orange (2020); Acrylic on washi; 79 × 79 in (200.6 × 200.6 cm)
- Washi Paper - Purple (2020); Acrylic on washi; 79 × 79 in (200.6 × 200.6 cm)
- Washi Paper - Purple/Black (2020); Acrylic on washi; 79 × 79 in (200.6 × 200.6 cm)
- Washi Paper - Red (2020); Acrylic on washi; 79 × 79 in (200.6 × 200.6 cm)
- Washi Paper - Turquoise (2020); Acrylic on washi; 38 5/8 × 38 5/8 in (98.1 × 98.1 cm)
- Washi Paper - Yellow (2020); Acrylic on washi; 79 × 79 in (200.6 × 200.6 cm)
- Annie (2022); Watercolor on washi; 77 3/4 × 42 3/4 in (197.5 × 108.6 cm)

== Prints ==
=== Prints on paper, canvas, fabric, and veneer ===
Includes editioned prints made with any method or technique, prints in variable editions, monotype prints, and unique mixed media prints on paper, canvas, fabric, or veneer with paint or collage.

==== 1970s ====
- Untitled (1971); Lithograph on paper; 24 × 32 in. (61 × 81.2 cm); Walker Art Center, Minneapolis
- Wave (1971); Color lithograph on four pieces of foil mounted on wove paper; Variable edition; 26 × 19 3/4 in (66.04 × 50.17 cm); Detroit Institute of Arts; High Museum of Art, Atlanta; Hood Museum of Art, Hanover, New Hampshire; Indianapolis Museum of Art; Minneapolis Institute of Art; National Gallery of Art, Washington, D.C.; and Zimmerli Art Museum, Rutgers University, New Brunswick, New Jersey
- Dance '72 (1972); Screenprint on paper; 32 1/4 × 19 in (81.9 × 48.2 cm); Smithsonian American Art Museum, Washington, D.C.
- Fire (1972); Lithograph on Japanese paper; Variable edition; 24 1/2 × 18 15/16 in (62.2 × 48.1 cm) [irreg.]; Ackland Art Museum, Chapel Hill, North Carolina; Art Institute of Chicago; Dayton Art Institute, Dayton, Ohio; Indianapolis Museum of Art; Minneapolis Institute of Art; Museum of Modern Art, New York; National Gallery of Art, Washington, D.C. (4 versions, including horizontal and green variants); Yale University Art Gallery, New Haven, Connecticut; Zimmerli Art Museum, Rutgers University, New Brunswick, New Jersey
- Nile (1972); Lithograph; Variable edition; 24 15/16 × 17 13/16 in (63.3 × 45.3 cm) [irreg.]; Allen Memorial Art Museum, Oberlin, Ohio; Minneapolis Institute of Art; Museum of Modern Art, New York; and Zimmerli Art Museum, Rutgers University, New Brunswick, New Jersey
- Untitled (1972); Silkscreen; Edition of 38; 41 1/4 × 29 5/8 in (104.77 × 75.25 cm)
- Untitled (1972); Silkscreen; 24 1/2 × 17 1/2 in (62.23 × 44.45 cm)
- Wild River Run (1972); Lithograph, flocking and glitter; 29 1/2 × 41 1/16 in (75 × 104.3 cm); Cantor Arts Center, Stanford, California
- Pink Horseshoes (1973); Silkscreen, monotopye on Arches paper; Edition of 42; 17 3/4 × 24 1/4 in (45.08 × 61.59 cm); Miami-Dade Public Library System, Miami
- Equal Employment Opportunity is the Law (1973); Poster; 30 × 22 in (76.2 × 55.88 cm) [framed]; Miami-Dade Public Library System, Miami
- Stitch and Sew (1973); Screenprint; 29 × 39 1/2 in (73.7 × 100.3 cm); Cantor Arts Center, Stanford, California
- T Shirt, from the portfolio Equal Employment Opportunity is the Law (1973); Screenprint on paper; 22 × 30 in (55.8 × 76.2 cm); Miami-Dade Public Library System, Miami; and Smithsonian American Art Museum, Washington, D.C.
- Top Bunk (1973); Color screenprint with flocking and metallic dust; 21 1/8 × 29 3/8 in (53.66 × 74.61 cm); Minneapolis Institute of Art
- Untitled (1973); Screenprint with embossing, stitching, and handcoloring in oil; 28.5 × 38.25 in (72.39 × 97.16 cm); Hallie Ford Museum of Art, Salem, Oregon
- Anchor (1974); Screenprint, die-cutting, collage and stitching on paper; 22 1/2 × 20 5/8 in (57.2 × 52.3 cm); Akron Art Museum, Akron, Ohio
- Chinaberry (1974); Color screenprint and vacuum formed screenprint; 20 1/16 × 26 1/2 in (51 × 67.3 cm); Cincinnati Art Museum
- Dusk (1974); Screenprint on handmade paper with collage; West Virginia University Art Museum, Morgantown, West Virginia
- A Fog in the Hollow (1974); Color screenprint and vacuum formed screenprint; Variable edition; 24 × 36 7/16 in (60.9 × 92.5 cm); Akron Art Museum, Akron, Ohio; and Cincinnati Art Museum
- Lumia (1974); Screenprint on handmade paper; 19 1/8 × 23 3/8 in (48.5 × 59.4 cm); Akron Art Museum, Akron, Ohio
- Meeker's Press (1974); Vacuum formed screenprint on handmade paper; Variable edition; 20 × 26 1/4 in (50.8 × 66.67 cm); Madison Museum of Contemporary Art, Madison, Wisconsin; and Chazen Museum of Art, Madison, Wisconsin
- Phase (1974); Screenprint; 29 1/2 × 29 5/8 in (74.9 × 75.2 cm); Metropolitan Museum of Art, New York; and University of Arizona Museum of Art, Tucson, Arizona
- Pulsar (1974); Screenprint with collage and stitching on paper; 10 1/2 × 10 1/2 in (26.7 × 26.7 cm); University of Michigan Museum of Art, Ann Arbor, Michigan
- Sam Senior (1974); Serigraph on Morilla AP etching paper; 51 × 54 1/4 in (129.5 × 137.9 cm); Akron Art Museum, Akron, Ohio
- Thursday (1974); Screenprint and dye with stitching on handmade paper; 14 1/2 × 20 13/16 in (36.8 × 52.8 cm); Akron Art Museum, Akron, Ohio
- Trame (1974); Monoprint, paint, collage, and thread on wove paper; 24 3/4 × 35 1/2 in (62.86 × 90.17 cm); Weatherspoon Art Museum, Greensboro, North Carolina
- Untitled (1974); Screenprint; 20 × 26 1/4 in (50.8 × 41.3 cm); Indianapolis Museum of Art
- Wausau (1975); Color embossed collagraph with embedded shards on paper; Variable edition; Diameter: 21 3/4 in (55.2 cm); Hammer Museum, Los Angeles and Phillips Collection, Washington, D.C.
- Wissahickon (1975); Color screenprint on wove paper; Edition of 30; 22 1/8 × 30 in (56.2 × 76.2 cm); Allen Memorial Art Museum, Oberlin, Ohio; Harvard Art Museums, Cambridge, Massachusetts; National Gallery of Art, Washington, D.C.; Philadelphia Museum of Art; and Smithsonian American Art Museum, Washington, D.C.
- Bardstown (1976); Collagraph on handmade paper; Edition of 25 (variable); 22 1/4 × 22 1/8 in (56.5 × 56.2 cm); Museum of Fine Arts, Houston
- Bowling Green (1976); Color collagraph with collage on multicolored, handmade paper; 22 1/4 × 22 5/8 in (56.52 × 57.47 cm); National Gallery of Art, Washington, D.C.
- For "200" (1976); Silkscreen on rag paper; 18 1/2 × 19 3/4 in (46.99 × 50.16 cm); Academy Art Museum, Easton, Maryland; Memorial Art Gallery, Rochester, New York; Phillips Collection, Washington, D.C.
- Glasgow (1976); Collograph on dyed handmade paper; 21 13/16 × 20 1/2 in (55.4 × 52 cm); Yale University Art Gallery, New Haven, Connecticut
- Louisville (1976); Collograph of found objects pressed into hand made paper; 21 3/4 × 21 3/4 in (55.24 × 55.24 cm) [framed]; Miami-Dade Public Library System, Miami
- Middleboro (1976); Collograph with embossing; Edition of 28 (variable); 22 × 22 in (55.9 × 55.9 cm); Memorial Art Gallery, Rochester, New York
- G.D.S. (1978); Screenprint on paper; 26 × 24 1/8 in (65.9 × 61.2 cm); Smithsonian American Art Museum, Washington, D.C.
- Tee 2 (1978); Screenprint with collage (cotton t-shirt) 33 3/4 × 25 7/8 in (85.7 × 65.7 cm); Museum of Fine Arts, Boston
- Red Lady (1979); Relief printing and etching on double-couched Upper US Paper Mill handmade; 24 × 35 3/4 in (61 × 90.8 cm); Akron Art Museum, Akron, Ohio

==== 1980s ====
- Cape (1980); Relief printing, embossing, and acrylic on paper; 20 3/4 × 36 in (52.7 × 91.4 cm); Yale University Art Gallery, New Haven, Connecticut
- Elegy #6 (1980); Monotype with embossing, relief printing, and handcoloring on hand-made paper; 23 1/2 × 35 5/8 in (59.7 × 90.5 cm); University of Michigan Museum of Art, Ann Arbor, Michigan
- Much (1980); Screenprint; 23 × 26 1/4 in (58.42 × 66.67 cm); Phillips Collection, Washington, D.C.
- Coffee Thyme II (1980); Lithograph, screenprint, etching, and embossing on paper; 31 1/8 × 40 9/16 in (79 × 103 cm); Herbert F. Johnson Museum of Art, Ithaca, New York; and Princeton University Art Museum, Princeton, New Jersey
- Coffee Thyme I (1979, published 1981); Color intaglio with lithography, rubber stamp and debossing on paper; 30 3/4 × 40 3/4 in (78 × 103.5 cm); Art Institute of Chicago
- Coffee Thyme II (vanilla) (1981); Color intaglio with lithography, rubber stamp and debossing on paper; 31 1/16 × 40 7/8 in (78.8 × 103.8 cm); Art Institute of Chicago; and Studio Museum in Harlem, New York
- Buoy Landscape suite (1982)

- Buoy Landscape I, from the suite Buoy Landscape (1982); Intaglio with screenprint on paper; 32 × 23 in (81.3 × 58.4 cm); Minneapolis Institute of Art; Smithsonian American Art Museum, Washington, D.C.; and Walker Art Center, Minneapolis
- Buoy Landscape II, from the suite Buoy Landscape (1982); Intaglio with screenprint on paper; 32 × 22 1/2 in (81.3 × 57.2 cm); Minneapolis Institute of Art; Smithsonian American Art Museum, Washington, D.C.; and Walker Art Center, Minneapolis
- Buoy Landscape III, from the suite Buoy Landscape (1982); Intaglio with screenprint on paper; 32 × 23 in (81.3 × 58.4 cm); Minneapolis Institute of Art; Smithsonian American Art Museum, Washington, D.C.; and Walker Art Center, Minneapolis
- Buoy Landscape IV, from the suite Buoy Landscape (1982); Intaglio with screenprint on paper; 32 × 23 in (81.3 × 58.4 cm); Minneapolis Institute of Art; Smithsonian American Art Museum, Washington, D.C.; and Walker Art Center, Minneapolis
- Buoy Landscape V, from the suite Buoy Landscape (1982); Intaglio with screenprint on paper; 32 × 23 in (81.3 × 58.4 cm); Minneapolis Institute of Art; Smithsonian American Art Museum, Washington, D.C.; and Walker Art Center, Minneapolis

- Lattice suite (1982)

- Lattice I, from the suite Lattice (1982); Color intaglio with lithograph on paper; 31 1/4 × 44 in (79.4 × 111.8 cm); David C. Driskell Center, College Park, Maryland; Smithsonian American Art Museum, Washington, D.C.; and Walker Art Center, Minneapolis
- Lattice II, from the suite Lattice (1982); Color intaglio with lithograph on paper; 47 3/4 × 31 3/4 in (121.28 cm × 80.64 cm); Art Institute of Chicago; and Walker Art Center, Minneapolis
- Lattice III, from the suite Lattice (1982); Color intaglio with lithograph on paper; 47 3/4 × 31 3/4 in (121.28 cm × 80.64 cm); Art Institute of Chicago; and Walker Art Center, Minneapolis
- Lattice IV, from the suite Lattice (1982); Color intaglio with lithograph on paper; 47 3/4 × 31 3/4 in (121.28 cm × 80.64 cm); Art Institute of Chicago; and Walker Art Center, Minneapolis

- Harlem Nights (1983); Color offset lithograph and screenprint collage; 27 1/2 × 34 11/16 in (69.9 × 88.1 cm) [irreg.]; Philadelphia Museum of Art
- July #15 (1984); Embossed and printed collage on handmade colored paper with acrylic paint and stitching; 24 1/2 × 24 1/4 in (62.2 × 61.6 cm); Museum of Fine Arts, Boston
- New Glarus (1984); Collage and collagraph; Edition of 4 (variable); 29 3/4 × 37 in (75.6 × 94 cm) [irreg.]; Whitney Museum, New York
- Untitled (1984); Monotype and rope on handmade paper; 21 1/4 × 86 1/4 in (54 × 219.1 cm)
- Untitled (1984); Collograph and acrylic on handmade paper; 28 3/4 × 39 3/4 in (73 × 101.1 cm); Hirshhorn Museum and Sculpture Garden, Smithsonian Institution, Washington, D.C.
- Unicorn Papers, Series I #3 (1985); Silkscreen, acrylic, and fabric on paper; 88 × 91 in (223.52 × 231.14 cm); University of Louisville Art Collection, Louisville, Kentucky
- Butterfly Days (1986); Printed acetate and painted wood on printed, handmade couched paper with string embedded; 43 × 53 1/2 in (109.22 × 135.89 cm) [approx.]; Madison Museum of Contemporary Art, Madison Wisconsin
- For Romare #3 (1987); Mixed media on two sheets, housed in two shaped frames, joined; 35 9/16 × 53 7/8 × 4 1/2 in (90.3 × 136.8 × 11.4 cm); Herbert F. Johnson Museum of Art, Ithaca, New York
- In Celebration (1987); 35-color screenprint on heavy wove paper; 32 1/16 × 40 3/16 in (81.4 × 102 cm); Fralin Museum of Art, Charlottesville, Virginia; Hirshhorn Museum and Sculpture Garden, Smithsonian Institution, Washington, D.C.; Memorial Art Gallery, Rochester, New York; National Gallery of Art, Washington, D.C.; and Smithsonian American Art Museum, Washington, D.C.
- Purple Antelope Space Squeeze (1987); Etching, aquatint, collagraph, hand-painted collage, and embossing on handmade paper; Variable edition; 42 3/4 × 36 3/4 in (108.59 × 93.35 cm) [variable]; Birmingham Museum of Art, Alabama; Chazen Museum of Art, Madison, Wisconsin; Madison Museum of Contemporary Art, Madison, Wisconsin; Milwaukee Art Museum; and Phillips Collection, Washington, D.C.
- Untitled (Philadelphia) (1987); Screenprint with collage and hand-coloring on white wove paper; 33 3/4 × 45 in (85.7 × 114.3 cm); Harvard Art Museums, Cambridge, Massachusetts
- Neruda's The Celery Hats (1989); Monoprint, color woodcut, relief print, hand-painting and collage on paper in artist's frame with hand-painted wooden appendage; 46 1/2 × 52 × 6 in (118.1 × 132.1 × 15.2 cm); Eskenazi Museum of Art, Bloomington, Indiana

==== 1990s ====
- Aviation 1 (1990); Monoprint; 42 × 31 1/4 in (106.68 × 79.37 cm)
- Aviation 8 (1990); Monoprint; 49 × 38 1/4 in (124.46 × 97.15 cm)
- Chehaw (1990); Monoprint with wood block printing, etching, stencil painting, and splash painting on paper; Variable edition; 44 × 29 1/2 in (111.8 × 74.9 cm); Chazen Museum of Art, Madison, Wisconsin; and Studio Museum in Harlem, New York
- For Xavier (1990); Color screenprint on textured paper; 32 × 40 3/16 in (81.3 × 102.1 cm); Smith College Museum of Art, Northampton, Massachusetts
- Epiphany 1 (1991); Monoprint; 31 × 42 in (78.74 × 106.68 cm)
- Running Naked (1991); Color woodcut and etching; 31 3/4 × 21 1/4 in (80.65 × 53.98 cm); Minneapolis Institute of Art
- Running (1991); Monoprint; 31 3/4 × 23 1/4 in (80.64 × 59 cm)
- Running Rouge 1 (1991); Monoprint; 24 × 92 in (60.96 × 233.68)
- Running Triptych (1991); Monoprint; 24 × 92 in (60.96 × 233.68)
- Blazing (1992); Monoprint; 44 × 30 in (111.76 × 76.2 cm)
- Fast Track (1992); Color etching and woodcut on handmade paper; 25 1/2 × 26 in (64.77 × 66 cm); Chazen Museum of Art, Madison, Wisconsin
- Golden Windows (1991); Monoprint; 31 × 42 in (78.74 × 106.68 cm)
- New Moon (1992); Color lithograph with hand additions and collage on paper; 30 × 22 3/8 in (76.2 × 56.8 cm); Eskenazi Museum of Art, Bloomington, Indiana
- Tapestry series (1992–1993)

- Tapestry 1 (1992-1993); Monoprint on paper; 42 × 25 1/2 in (106.7 × 64.8 cm); Studio Museum in Harlem, New York
- Tapestry 4 (1992-1993); Monoprint on paper; 42 × 25 in (106.7 × 63.5 cm); Studio Museum in Harlem, New York
- Tapestry 13 (1992-1993); Monoprint on paper; 40 × 23 in (101.6 × 58.4 cm); Studio Museum in Harlem, New York
- Tapestry 15 (1992-1993); Monoprint on paper; 39 × 26 in (99.1 × 66 cm); Studio Museum in Harlem, New York

- Indigo (1993); Offset print; Edition of 100; 15 × 22 in (38.1 × 55.88 cm); David C. Driskell Center, College Park, Maryland
- Pretty Boxes (1993); Color offset lithograph and screenprint on four joined sheets of wove Arches paper; 30 1/8 × 42 11/16 in (76.5 × 108.5 cm) [irreg.]; Harvard Art Museums, Cambridge, Massachusetts; and National Gallery of Art, Washington, D.C.
- Tower series (1993)

- Tower 7 (1993); Monoprint; 31 3/4 × 39 1/2 in (80.64 × 100.33 cm)
- Tower 9 (1993); Monoprint; 31 3/4 × 39 1/2 in (80.64 × 100.33 cm)
- Tower 21 (1993); Monoprint; 31 3/4 × 39 1/2 in (80.64 × 100.33 cm)
- Tower 27 (1993); Monoprint; 31 3/4 × 39 1/2 in (80.64 × 100.33 cm)

- Golden Neck (1993–1994); Screenprint, offset lithograph, and hand-applied acrylic with stitching; 43 5/16 × 30 in (110 × 76.2 cm) [irreg.]; Saint Louis Art Museum
- Maquette for Golden Elements Inside Gold, 600 Yds. of Painted Fabric Constructed on Cable (1993–1994); Chromogenic prints, plastic and paper on board; 23 × 19 3/16 in (58.4 × 48.7 cm); Whitney Museum, New York
- Double Dutch (1994); Offset print collage and thread on paper; Edition of 94; 14 × 50 in (35.56 × 127 cm); David C. Driskell Center, College Park, Maryland
- Tre 94 (1994); Serigraph collage, ink, and thread on paper; 36 × 23 in (91.44 × 58.42 cm); David C. Driskell Center, College Park, Maryland; and Palmer Museum of Art, State College, Pennsylvania
- Hav-a-Tampa 15 (1995); Screenprint and monoprint with stitching; 33 15/16 × 28 11/16 in (86.2 × 72.9 cm); Saint Louis Art Museum
- Niagara on the Potomac (1995); Color screenprint on Rising wove paper; 23 1/16 × 40 in (58.58 × 101.6 cm); David C. Driskell Center, College Park, Maryland; and National Gallery of Art, Washington, D.C.
- Untitled (1995); Monotype with collage on irregular hand-made paper; Washington and Lee University Museums, Lexington, Virginia
- Untitled (c. 1996); Mixed media assemblage; 25 × 14 in (63.5 × 35.56 cm); Pennsylvania Academy of the Fine Arts; Philadelphia
- As Kids Go (1996); Color lithograph with paper collage and acrylic on handmade paper; 23 × 33 in (58.4 × 83.8 cm); DePaul University Art Museum, Chicago; George Washington University Art Collection, Washington, D.C.; Howard University Gallery of Art, Washington, D.C.; La Salle University Art Museum, Philadelphia; Weatherspoon Art Museum, Greensboro, North Carolina; and Yale University Art Gallery, New Haven, Connecticut
- GDS /50 (1996); Collage of collagraphs with acrylic, metal snaps, and machine-sewn thread on die-cut paper; Edition of 50 + 10 PPs; 28 × 24 in (71.1 × 61 cm); Whitney Museum, New York
- Big (1992–1997); Monotype collage on Arches paper; 31 × 42 in (78.7 × 106.7 cm); Fine Arts Museums of San Francisco
- Lightning Bolt! (1997); Screenprint with paint; 26 7/8 × 26 1/2 in (68.3 × 67.3 cm); Saint Louis Art Museum
- Manet (1998); Mixed media monoprint with handpainting, relief printing, screenprinting, cutouts, collage, and stitching on handmade paper; Variable edition; 18 1/2 × 23 1/2 in (47 × 59.7 cm); Chazen Museum of Art, Madison, Wisconsin; Detroit Institute of Arts; and Madison Museum of Contemporary Art, Madison, Wisconsin
- Untitled (1998); Lithograph, handmade paper, collé; Variable edition of 60; 22 1/4 × 21 3/4 in (56.5 × 55.2 cm); David C. Driskell Center, College Park, Maryland; Mead Art Museum, Amherst, Massachusetts; Muscarelle Museum of Art, Williamsburg, Virginia; and Palmer Museum of Art, State College, Pennsylvania
- Untitled, from the series Shooting Star (1998); Mixed media; 15 1/2 × 17 1/2 in (39.4 × 44.5 cm); Yale University Art Gallery, New Haven, Connecticut
- Ben II (1999); Lithograph; 18 3/8 × 27 1/2 in (46.7 × 69.9 cm); Saint Louis Art Museum

==== 2000s ====
- Untitled (2001); Screenprint; 40 5/8 × 47 3/4 in (103.2 × 121.3 cm); Art in Embassies Program (Collection of United States Department of State)
- Journey Home (2002); Silkscreen print; 20 × 40 in (50.8 × 101.6 cm); Phillips Collection, Washington, D.C.
- Bowling (2002); Relief on veneer and chine appliqué; 29 3/4 × 39 5/8 in (75.56 × 100.65 cm); Chazen Museum of Art, Madison, Wisconsin
- Lilly's Print (2002); Relief on wood veneer; 30 × 30 in (76.2 × 76.2 cm); Chazen Museum of Art, Madison, Wisconsin
- Lilly's Print (left) (2002); Relief on wood veneer; 30 × 20 in (76.2 × 50.8 cm); Chazen Museum of Art, Madison, Wisconsin
- Lilly's Print (right) (2002); Two-color woodblock print on two pieces of wood veneer; 29 3/4 × 29 3/4 in (75.56 × 75.56 cm); Baltimore Museum of Art; and Chazen Museum of Art, Madison, Wisconsin
- No Title (2002); Relief on wood veneer; 30 × 20 in (76.2 × 50.8 cm); Chazen Museum of Art, Madison, Wisconsin
- No Title (2002); Relief on wood veneer; 30 × 20 in (76.2 × 50.8 cm); Chazen Museum of Art, Madison, Wisconsin
- No Title (2002); Relief on wood veneer; 30 × 20 in (76.2 × 50.8 cm); Chazen Museum of Art, Madison, Wisconsin
- Union Pacific (2002); Relief on wood veneer; 30 × 30 in (76.2 × 76.2 cm); Chazen Museum of Art, Madison, Wisconsin
- Union Pacific (2002); Relief on wood veneer; 30 × 30 in (76.2 × 76.2 cm); Chazen Museum of Art, Madison, Wisconsin
- ARS (ars longa, vita brevis) (2003); Color screenprint on wove paper; 28 15/16 × 20 in (73.5 × 50.8 cm); David C. Driskell Center, College Park, Maryland; Howard University Gallery of Art, Washington, D.C.; National Gallery of Art, Washington, D.C.; and Yale University Art Gallery, New Haven, Connecticut
- 5 a.m. (2004); Cut and sewn color relief prints on wove paper, fabric, and felt; Variable edition of 50; 22 1/4 × 15 1/2 in (56.5 × 39.4 cm); Cleveland Museum of Art
- Castle Banner 1 (2004); Monoprint collage; 60 × 40 in (152.4 × 101.6 cm); Chazen Museum of Art, Madison, Wisconsin
- Castle Banner 5 (2004); Monoprint collage; 48 1/2 × 36 1/2 in (123.19 × 92.71 cm); Chazen Museum of Art, Madison, Wisconsin
- New Bridges (2004); Relief print; 30 × 22 1/2 in (76.2 × 57.15 cm); Allentown Art Museum, Allentown, Pennsylvania; David C. Driskell Center, College Park, Maryland; Pennsylvania Academy of the Fine Arts, Philadelphia; and Mount Holyoke College Art Museum, South Hadley, Massachusetts
- Sam (2004); Relief print and collage on felt; 22 1/2 × 15 in (57.2 × 38.1 cm) [irreg.]; Yale University Art Gallery, New Haven, Connecticut
- Untitled (2004), from the portfolio Master Artists/Master Printmakers: Portfolio I (2003–2004); Cut and sewn color relief prints on wove paper, fabric, and felt; 22 1/4 × 15 1/2 in (56.52 × 39.37 cm); National Gallery of Art, Washington, D.C.
- Untitled (Blue) (2004), from the deluxe edition of the book Three Decades of American Printmaking: The Brandywine Workshop Collection (2004); Color offset lithograph; 10 15/16 × 8 7/16 in (27.8 × 21.4 cm); Philadelphia Museum of Art
- Untitled (Red) (2004), from the deluxe edition of the book Three Decades of American Printmaking: The Brandywine Workshop Collection (2004); Color offset lithograph; 11 × 8 9/16 in (27.9 × 21.7 cm); Philadelphia Museum of Art
- Untitled (Yellow) (2004), from the deluxe edition of the book Three Decades of American Printmaking: The Brandywine Workshop Collection (2004); Color offset lithograph; 10 15/16 × 8 7/16 in (27.8 × 21.4 cm); Philadelphia Museum of Art
- Castle Banner 5 (2005); Relief print on wood veneer with collage; 60 × 40 in (152.4 × 101.6 cm)
- Dogon series (2005)

- Dogon I, from the Dogon series (2005); Screenprint; 30 1/2 × 22 1/2 in (77.47 × 57.15 cm); Plains Art Museum, Fargo, North Dakota
- Dogon II, from the Dogon series (2005); Screenprint; 30 1/2 × 22 1/2 in (77.47 × 57.15 cm); Plains Art Museum, Fargo, North Dakota
- Dogon III, from the Dogon series (2005); Screenprint; 30 1/2 × 22 1/2 in (77.47 × 57.15 cm); Plains Art Museum, Fargo, North Dakota
- Dogon IV, from the Dogon series (2005); Screenprint; 30 1/2 × 22 1/2 in (77.47 × 57.15 cm); Plains Art Museum, Fargo, North Dakota
- Dogon V, from the Dogon series (2005); Screenprint; 30 1/2 × 22 1/2 in (77.47 × 57.15 cm); Plains Art Museum, Fargo, North Dakota

- Soaring (2005); Serigraph; 23 3/5 × 16 2/5 in (59.94 × 41.66 cm); David C. Driskell Center, College Park, Maryland
- Wind (2005); Screenprint and collage; Edition of 150; 14 1/2 × 21 in (36.8 × 53.3 cm); Allentown Art Museum, Allentown, Pennsylvania; David C. Driskell Center, College Park, Maryland; Howard University Gallery of Art, Washington, D.C.; and Yale University Art Gallery, New Haven, Connecticut
- Barnet Stone Mythography portfolio (2007); Serigraph, etching, and lithography on paper (7 parts) in felt box with lithograph on lid; Box: 23 3/8 × 31 3/8 × 1 1/4 in (59.4 × 79.7 × 3.2 cm), prints variable; Mount Holyoke College Art Museum, South Hadley, Massachusetts; and Pennsylvania Academy of the Fine Arts, Philadelphia
- Ferris Wheel (2007); Relief, digital print, and collage on fir and maple veneer; 48 1/2 × 73 in (123.19 × 185.42 cm); Chazen Museum of Art, Madison, Wisconsin
- Tree (2007); Monoprint and collage on wood; 48 × 37 in (121.9 × 94 cm)
- Destiny (2008); Offset print; Edition of 75; 28 3/4 × 17 1/2 in (73 × 44.45 cm); David C. Driskell Center, College Park, Maryland
- New Movie 1 (2008); Relief and digital print on fir veneer; 32 3/8 × 29 1/8 in (82.23 × 73.98 cm); Chazen Museum of Art, Madison, Wisconsin
- New Movie 2 (2008); Relief and digital print on fir veneer; 32 1/2 × 29 1/8 in (82.55 × 73.98 cm); Chazen Museum of Art, Madison, Wisconsin
- New Movie 3 (2008); Relief and digital print on fir veneer; 32 5/8 × 29 3/8 in (82.87 × 74.61 cm); Chazen Museum of Art, Madison, Wisconsin
- New Movie 4 (2008); Relief and digital print on fir veneer; 32 3/4 × 29 3/8 in (83.18 × 74.61 cm); Chazen Museum of Art, Madison, Wisconsin
- Chakaia (2009); Serigraph on fabric; 25 × 30 in (63.5 × 76.2 cm); Rollins Museum of Art, Winter Park, Florida
- Destiny (2009); Lithograph; 29 3/4 × 19 in (75.56 × 48.26 cm); Howard University Gallery of Art, Washington, D.C.
- Museum Moment (2009); Silkscreen; Edition of 105; 32 × 40 in (81.28 × 101.6 cm); David C. Driskell Center, College Park, Maryland; and Herbert F. Johnson Museum of Art, Ithaca, New York

==== 2010s ====
- Cloudy Fingers (2010); Relief/digital print, acrylic on rice paper, framed; 33 × 39 × 5 1/5 in (83.82 × 99 × 13.97 cm)
- Days (2010); Relief/digital print, acrylic on rice paper, framed; 52 1/4 × 47 × 6 in (132.71 × 119.38 × 15.24 cm)
- For the Fog 14 (2010); Ink with acrylic paint and polymer varnishes on paper, relief and digital print; 44 1/2 × 45 1/2 in (113.03 × 115.57 cm); Indianapolis Museum of Art
- For the Fog A (2010); Relief/digital print, cut and reassembled collage, acrylic, on handmade paper; 26 × 50 in (66 × 127 cm)
- For the Fog B (2010); Relief/digital print, cut and reassembled collage, acrylic, on handmade paper; 24 1/2 × 35 in (62.23 × 88.9 cm)
- For the Fog C (2010); Relief/digital print, cut and reassembled collage, acrylic, on handmade paper; 44 × 34 in (111.76 × 86.36 cm)
- For the Fog D (2010); Relief/digital print, cut and reassembled collage, acrylic, on handmade paper; 33 × 30 in (83.82 × 76.2 cm)
- In the Fog (2010); Relief/digital print, collograph, acrylic, nylon thread, wood vener, cork veneer, collage; 30 1/2 × 41 1/4 in (77.47 × 112.39 cm); Chazen Museum of Art, Madison, Wisconsin; and Maier Museum of Art, Lynchburg, Virginia
- Making Green (2010); Relief/digital print, acrylic on rice paper, framed; 29 3/4 × 33 1/4 × 5 1/2 in (75.56 × 84.45 × 13.97 cm)
- Nova (2010); Relief/digital print, acrylic on rice paper, framed; 31 × 27 × 6 in (78.74 × 68.58 × 15.24 cm)
- Printing on the World 3 (2010); Oil based monotype, acrylic paint, powdered pigment; 30 × 22 in (76.2 × 55.88 cm)
- Reflection to Little Miss Cole (2010); Relief/digital print, acrylic, mixed media collaged on paper; Mint Museum, Charlotte, North Carolina
- Standing up Goya (2010); Relief/digital print, acrylic on rice paper, framed; 93 1/2 × 36 1/2 × 7 in (237.49 × 92.71 × 17.78 cm)
- Untitled (2010); Mixed media and collage; Irregular dimensions; Madison Museum of Contemporary Art, Madison, Wisconsin
- Phelps (2016); Monotype, with hand-coloring and collage, on handmade paper on canvas; Variable edition; 46 1/4 × 74 1/8 in (117.47 × 188.28 cm); Madison Museum of Contemporary Art, Madison, Wisconsin; and University of Michigan Museum of Art, Ann Arbor, Michigan
- Frieze (2017); Monotypes in artist's frames; Eleven parts, overall dimensions variable; Georgetown Lombardi Comprehensive Cancer Center, Washington, D.C.
- Walter/Josef (2018); Screenprint; 26.9 × 40 in (68.4 × 101.8 cm); Kunstmuseum Basel, Switzerland

=== Sculptural prints ===
Includes prints on metal, wood, and plastic and 3-dimensional print constructions

==== Undated ====
- Pages and Echoes #2 (n.d.); Acrylic paper collage on board; 18 3/4 × 24 1/2 × 3 1/4 in (47.62 × 62.23 × 8.25 cm); Virginia Museum of Fine Arts, Richmond, Virginia

==== 1970s ====
- Cranes (1972); Color screenprint with machine stitching and metal coathanger; 30 5/8 × 17 in (77.8 × 43.2 cm); Yale University Art Gallery, New Haven, Connecticut
- Pink Horse Shoes (1973); Serigraph, flocking, and glitter on Arches Cover Paper with clothes hanger; 23 × 14 1/4 in. (58.4 × 36.2 cm); Akron Art Museum, Akron, Ohio

==== 1980s ====
- Dave Dove Liz (1986); Three-dimensional color monotype in wood box; 54 × 49 in (137.2 × 124.5 cm) × 2 in (5.1 cm) [depth approx.]
- Untitled (1987); Lithograph, etching, screenprint collage with aluminum elements; 73 1/4 × 103 3/8 × 3 5/8 in (186.05 × 262.57 × 9.21 cm); Walker Art Center, Minneapolis
- Untitled (1987); Color lithograph, screenprint, etching; cut and collaged to Gatorboard and foam core; enclosed in wooden box frame with anodized aluminum elements under Plexiglas; 41 × 40 1/4 × 3 5/8 in (104.14 × 102.24 × 9.21 cm); Minneapolis Institute of Art
- Tulip Series: Blossoms (1989); Collage and pigment; Washington and Lee University Museums, Lexington, Virginia
- Tulip Series: Petal (1989); Collage and pigment; 20 × 16 × 6 in (50.8 × 40.6 × 15.2 cm) [approx.]; Howard University Gallery of Art, Washington, D.C.

== Temporary, destroyed, and non-extant works ==
Gilliam created and exhibited works throughout his career that he would later dismantle and either sell as smaller pieces, destroy, or reconstitute into other works, and several of his commissioned installations have been dismantled or destroyed following renovations or construction. Works are included in this category regardless of their medium. These include temporary public installations that the artist is recorded to have reclaimed, site-specific installations, and destroyed works.

=== 1960s ===
- Baroque Cascade (1969); Acrylic on canvas; Dimensions variable; Originally exhibited at Gilliam, Krebs, McGowin (1969), Corcoran Gallery of Art, Washington, D.C.

=== 1970s ===
- Dark as I Am (1968–1973); Acrylic, clothing, backpack, painter's tools, wooden closet pole on wood, crayon on walls, sunglasses, boots, ladder, paint bucket; Dimensions variable; Originally exhibited in 1973 at Jefferson Place Gallery, Washington, D.C.; Later reconstituted to form Composed (formerly Dark as I Am) (1968–1974).
- Autumn Surf (1973); Acrylic on polypropylene canvas, wood; Dimensions variable; Originally exhibited at Works in Spaces (1973), San Francisco Museum of Modern Art; Painted canvas was later reconstituted to form part of Niagara (1977–1978) and Autumn Surf East (1972–1990)
- Seahorses (1975); Acrylic on canvas, 6 parts; Dimensions variable; Originally exhibited in 1975 on the exterior walls of the Philadelphia Museum of Art; Exhibited again in 1976, with 5 canvases instead of 6, on the exterior walls of the Brooklyn Museum, New York
- Three Panels for Mr. Robeson (1975); Acrylic on canvas; Dimensions variable; Originally exhibited at the 34th Corcoran Biennial Exhibition of Contemporary American Painting (1975), Corcoran Gallery of Art, Washington, D.C.
- Custom Road Slide (1977); Acrylic on wood, polypropylene, and shale; Dimensions variable; Originally exhibited at Earl W. Brydges Artpark State Park, Lewiston, New York
- Niagara (1977–1978); Acrylic on polypropylene, wood, pipe, rope, and rocks, including painted canvas previously exhibited as Autumn Surf (1973); 136 × 408 × 324 in (345.44 × 1036.32 × 822.96 cm), overall dimensions variable; Originally exhibited at Sam Gilliam: Indoor & Outdoor Paintings, 1967-1978 (1978), University Museum of Contemporary Art, University of Massachusetts Amherst; Painted canvas was later reconstituted to form part of Niagara Extended (1982)

=== 1980s ===
- Dupont Circle Grand (1980); Oil and acrylic on canvas, wood, metal beams; 35 × 40 ft (1066.8 × 1219.2 cm); Originally exhibited at Dupont Circle Metro station, Washington, D.C., as an initiative of the Washington Project for the Arts' Art Site program, in conjunction with the 11th International Sculpture Conference
- Niagara Extended (1982); Acrylic on polypropylene, wood, pipe, rope, and rocks, including painted canvas previously exhibited as Niagara (1977–1978); Dimensions variable; Originally exhibited at Sam Gilliam (1982), Artspace Gallery, Coral Gables, Florida

=== 1990s ===
- Autumn Surf East (1972–1990); Acrylic on polypropylene, including painted canvas previously exhibited as Autumn Surf (1973); 15 × 300 ft (4.57 × 91.44 m); Dimensions variable; Originally exhibited at Rockville Art Place (now VisArts), Rockville, Maryland
- Ferris Wheel (1991); Woodcut prints and acrylic on canvas and aluminum; Dimensions variable; Originally exhibited at Sam Gilliam: Of Fireflies or Ferris Wheels (1991), Walker Hill Art Center, Seoul (organized by U.S. Information Agency); printed and painted canvas was later reconstituted to form Of Fireflies and Ferris Wheels: Monastery Parallel (1997)
- Of Fireflies (1991); Woodcut prints and acrylic on canvas and wood; Originally exhibited at Sam Gilliam: Of Fireflies or Ferris Wheels (1991), Walker Hill Art Center, Seoul (organized by U.S. Information Agency); printed and painted canvas was later reconstituted to form Of Fireflies and Ferris Wheels: Monastery Parallel (1997)
- Bikers Move Like Swallows II (1995); Acrylic, tobacco linen, and aluminum rings; Dimensions variable; Originally exhibited in 1990 at the 44th Biennial Exhibition of Contemporary American Painting: Painting Outside Painting (1995–1996), Corcoran Gallery of Art, Washington, D.C.
- Of Firelies and Ferris Wheels: Monastery Parallel (1997); Woodcut prints and acrylic on sewn polypropylene, wood, mirrors, including printed canvas previously exhibited as Of Fireflies (1991) and Ferris Wheel (1991); Dimensions variable; Originally exhibited in 1997 in the chapel gallery at Kunstmuseum Kloster Unser Lieben Frauen Magdeburg, Magdeburg, Germany
- Untitled (1998); Acrylic on canvas, custom flotation devices; Dimensions variable; Originally exhibited at Sam Gilliam in 3D (1998–1999), Kreeger Museum, Washington, D.C.

=== 2010s ===
- Close to Trees #1-11 (1990–2011); Drapes suspended from ceiling, acrylic on polypropylene; Dimensions variable; Originally exhibited at Sam Gilliam: Close to Trees (2011), American University Museum, Washington, D.C.
- Close to Trees Double (1990–2011); Drapes suspended from ceiling, acrylic on polypropylene; Dimensions variable; Originally exhibited at Sam Gilliam: Close to Trees (2011), American University Museum, Washington, D.C.
- Wall Cascade (1990–2011); Acrylic on polypropylene; Dimensions variable; Originally exhibited at Sam Gilliam: Close to Trees (2011), American University Museum, Washington, D.C.
- Wall Cascade with Mirror (1990–2011); Acrylic on polypropylene; Dimensions variable; Originally exhibited at Sam Gilliam: Close to Trees (2011), American University Museum, Washington, D.C.
- Flour Mill (2011); Acrylic on suspended nylon panels; Dimensions variable; Originally exhibited at Sam Gilliam: Flour Mill (2011), Phillips Collection, Washington, D.C.
- Yves Klein Blue (2017); Acrylic on Cerex nylon; Dimensions variable; Originally exhibited at Viva Arte Viva, 57th Venice Biennale (2017)
