= Five College Museums/Historic Deerfield =

Museum consortium in Massachusetts, US

The Five Colleges and Historic Deerfield Museum Consortium is a consortium of museums in Western Massachusetts and includes art museums which are part of the Five Colleges as well as Historic Deerfield. The Five College Museums maintains a searchable database of the collections of the museums that is among the larger art galleries on the internet. These museums also participate in Museums10.

== Museums included ==
- The Mead Art Museum (Amherst College)
- The Mount Holyoke College Art Museum (Mount Holyoke College)
- The University Museum of Contemporary Art of the University of Massachusetts Amherst
- The Smith College Museum of Art (Smith College)
- The Hampshire College Art Gallery (Hampshire College)
- Historic Deerfield

== See also ==
- Museums10- A consortium of art, science, and history museums in Western Massachusetts
