= Museums10 =

Museum consortium in Massachusetts, US

Museums10 is a consortium of art, science, and history museums in Western Massachusetts. It includes art museums from the Five Colleges and Historic Deerfield.

== Art museums ==
- The Hampshire College Art Gallery (Hampshire College)
- The Mead Art Museum (Amherst College)
- The Mount Holyoke College Art Museum (Mount Holyoke College)
- The Smith College Museum of Art (Smith College)
- The University Museum of Contemporary Art (University of Massachusetts Amherst)

== Other museums ==
- The Beneski Museum of Natural History
- The Emily Dickinson Museum
- The Eric Carle Museum of Picture Book Art
- Historic Deerfield
- The Yiddish Book Center

== See also ==
- Five College Museums/Historic Deerfield: Another set of museums, recorder of the works in the college art museums and Historic Deerfield.
