= Mount Holyoke College Art Museum =

Art museum in Massachusetts, United States

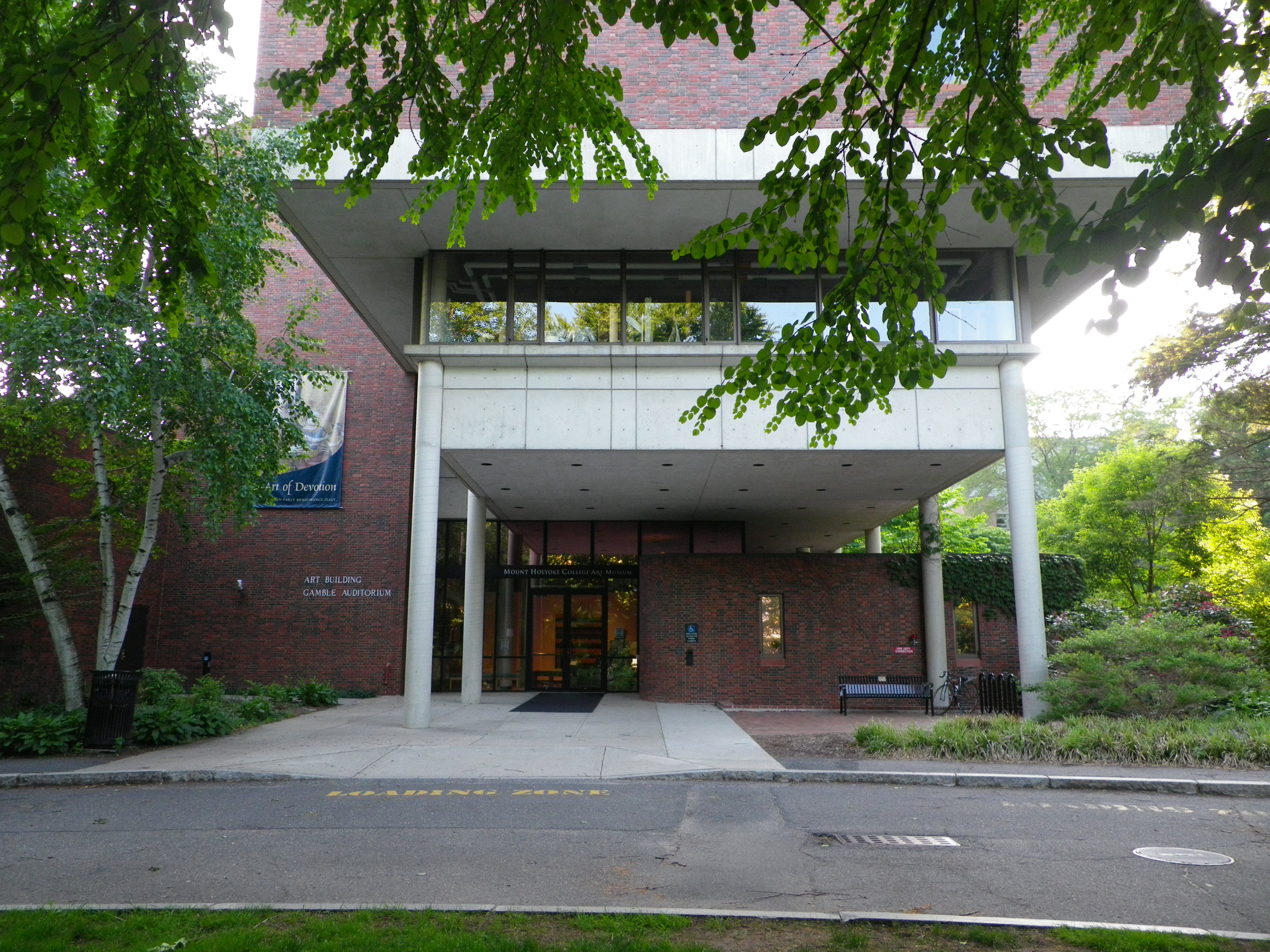
- Established: 1876
- Location: South Hadley, Massachusetts
- Coordinates: 42.2568°N 72.5727°W
- Key holdings: Hetch Hetchy Canyon by Albert Bierstadt
- Website: www.mtholyoke.edu/artmuseum/

The Mount Holyoke College Art Museum (established 1876) in South Hadley, Massachusetts, is located on the Mount Holyoke College campus and is a member of Museums10. It is one of the oldest teaching museums in the country, dedicated to providing firsthand experience with works of significant aesthetic and cultural value. The works in the museum's collection can be searched on the database maintained by the Five College Museums/Historic Deerfield.

Working in conjunction with the Five College museums, its collection includes contemporary works from Asia, Europe, and the United States, as well as classical Egyptian, Greek, and Roman works. Other periods include medieval and Renaissance art. The collection was inaugurated by the purchase of Albert Bierstadt's Hetch Hetchy Canyon (oil, 1875) by Mrs. A. L. Williston and Mrs. E. H. Sawyer in 1876.

In addition to the permanent collection, the museum offers multiple rotating exhibitions each year.

In March 2016, the museum was named one of the "35 Best College Art Museums" in the nation by Best College Reviews.

== See also ==
- List of museums in the United States
