= University Museum of Contemporary Art =

Art museum at UMass Amherst

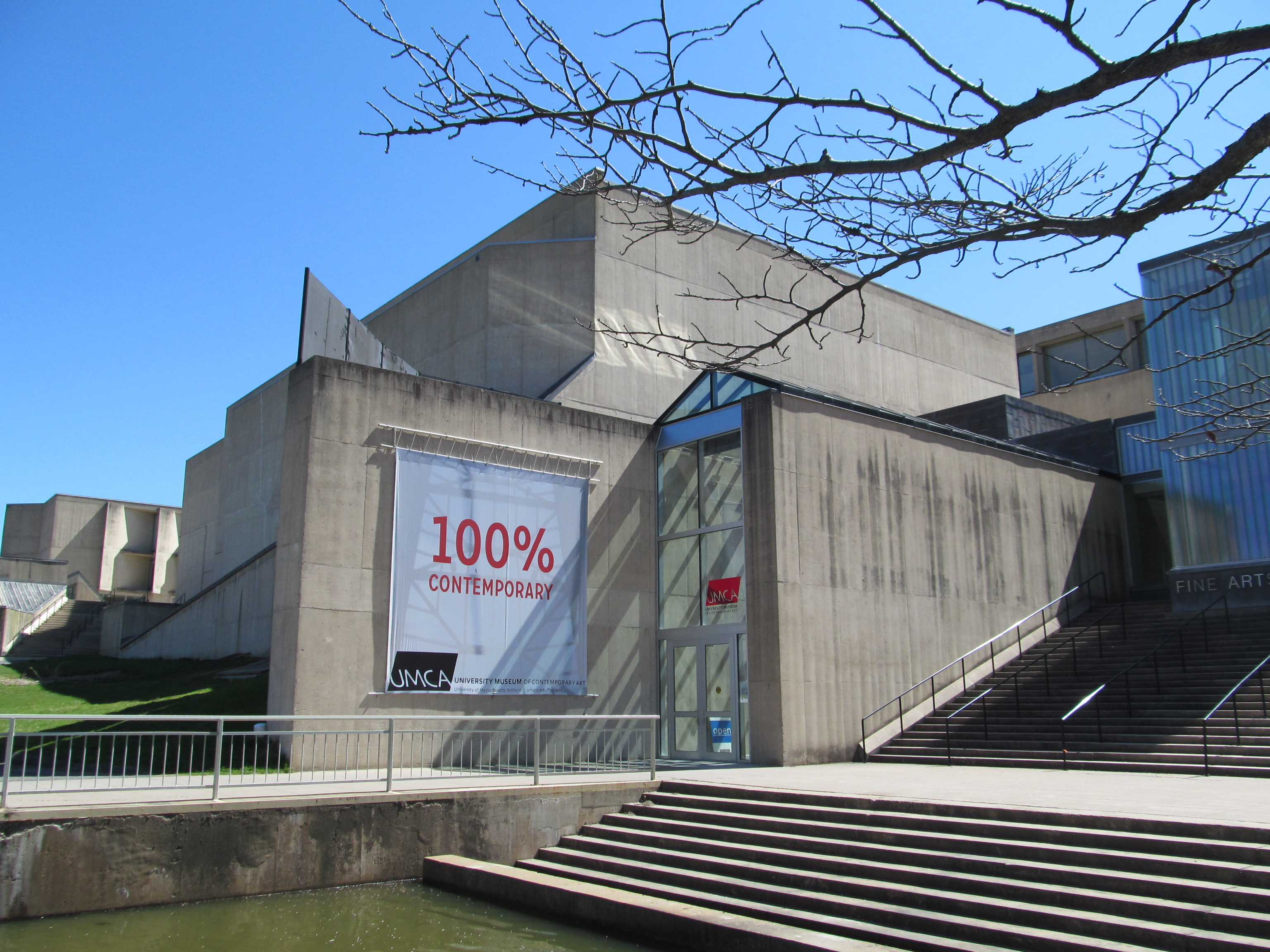
- Museum facade in 2012
- Established: 1975
- Location: Amherst, Massachusetts
- Coordinates: 42.388235°N 72.525773°W
- Director: Loretta Yarlow (2016)
- Website: Official website

The University Museum of Contemporary Art (formerly known as the University Gallery) is a contemporary art museum on the campus of the University of Massachusetts Amherst. The UMCA has been housed in the university's Fine Arts Center since 1975, after the university began collecting works in 1962. The museum's collection of about 2,600 pieces from the second half of the 20th century includes 154 photographs taken by Andy Warhol. The UMCA is a member of the Five College Museums10.
