= Jockey International =

American manufacturer of sportswear

Jockey International, Inc.
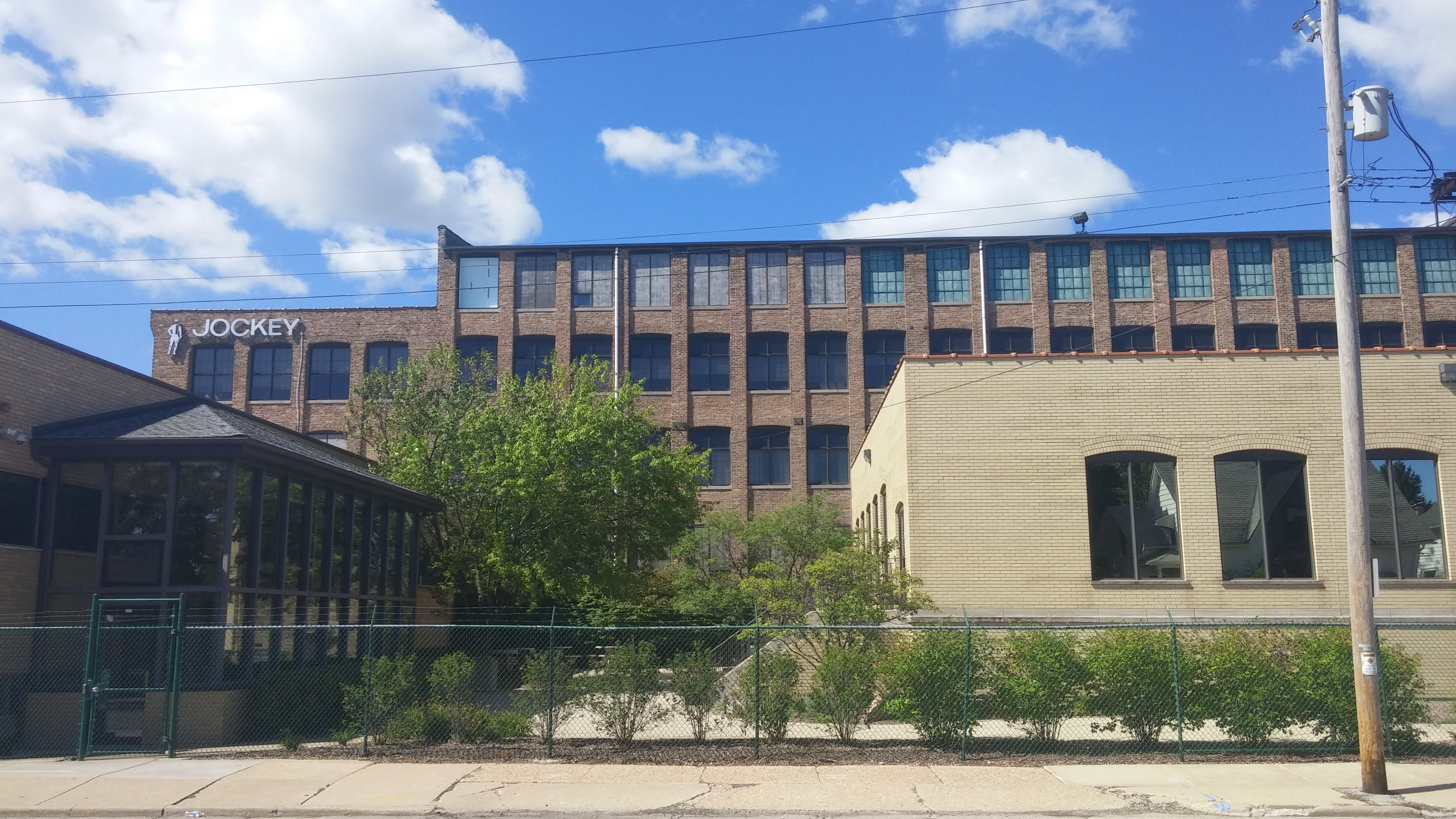
- Jockey International, Inc. in 2015
- Type: Private company
- Industry: Textile
- Predecessor: S.T. Cooper & Sons
- Founded: 1876; 150 years ago (as Coopers Inc.); St. Joseph, Michigan, U.S.
- Founder: Samuel T. Cooper
- Headquarters: Kenosha, Wisconsin, United States
- Products: Underwear and related products for men, women, boys, and girls
- Production output: Central America, the Caribbean, United Kingdom, and the United States
- Website: jockey.com

Jockey International, Inc. is an American manufacturer and retailer of underwear, sleepwear, and sportswear for men, women, and children. The company is based in Kenosha, Wisconsin. Jockey invented the first men's Y-Front brief in 1934 and it is a recognized trademark in 120 countries.

== History ==
Jockey was originally named Coopers, Inc., and was founded by Samuel T. Cooper in St. Joseph, Michigan in 1876 as a hosiery business. Cooper began the business after hearing that lumberjacks suffered from poorly constructed wool socks. In 1900, Cooper began making undergarments. By 1902 the business was expanding. However, by 1934 Coopers Inc. was nearly bankrupt due to the Great Depression. The company recruited Harry H. Wolf Sr., to restructure the company.

On January 19, 1935, during a blizzard, Coopers, Inc. sold the world's first briefs at the Marshall Field's State Street store in downtown Chicago. Designed by so-called 'apparel engineer' Arthur Kneibler, briefs dispensed with leg sections and had a Y-shaped overlapping fly. The company dubbed it the Jockey, claiming it offered support like a jockstrap. Over 30,000 pairs were sold within three months of their introduction. Coopers used a Mascul-liner plane to deliver masculine support briefs to retailers across the US. When they were introduced to the UK in 1938, they sold 3,000 a week.

In 1958, the company introduced the first mass-sale men's bikini brief, known as 'Skants'. The low-cut nylon and elastic brief, inspired by women's bikinis, had no front fly and was unlined apart from a small support panel at the lower front. Coopers renamed itself Jockey Menswear, Inc. in 1971, and Jockey International, Inc. the following year. In 1997 Jockey acquired the seamless panties division of Formfit-Rogers, and sold them under the name Form-Fit (this branding was later discontinued). In 1982, Jockey introduced the Jockey For Her line of intimate apparel and underwear. In 2011, Jockey launched a line of underwear using Outlast Technologies, which was originally developed to help NASA astronauts stay comfortable in changing temperatures and reduce sweating.

In August 2020, country singer Luke Bryan became a paid corporate spokesperson for the Jockey brand. In October 2020, Jockey International's India and its affiliate Page Industries were investigated by the US-based Worldwide Responsible Accredited Production (WRAP) over allegations of human rights violations in one of its factories. In December of the same year, Page Industries Ltd., the licensee of Jockey International in India, was recertified by Worldwide Responsible Accredited Production (WRAP) and found to be socially compliant. WRAP said human rights violations allegations were not substantiated by the findings of the audit.

== Philanthropy ==
Jockey sponsors the Jockey Being Family Foundation, a charity focused on supporting families after they have adopted a child. Jockey claims that the foundation increases awareness of and accessibility to post-adoption services in the United States for adoptive families. The foundation distributes Jockey-branded backpacks and tote bags to a number of adopted children and adoptive parents. Jockey does not disclose how much funding it gives to the foundation.

== See also ==
- List of sock manufacturers

== Bibliography ==
- Still, Judith (2003). "Men's Bodies: Paragraph". Paragraph. 26 (1–2). Edinburgh: Edinburgh University Press. ISBN 978-0-7486-1938-2. ISSN 0264-8334. OCLC 254546376.
- Goetsch, Hal W. (1993). Developing, Implementing & Managing an Effective Marketing Plan. Lincolnwood, Illinois: American Marketing Association. ISBN 978-0-8442-3370-3. LCCN 92009838. OCLC 25551659.
- Knapp, John C. (2007). Leaders on Ethics: Real-World Perspectives on Today's Business Challenges. Westport, Connecticut: Praeger. ISBN 978-0-275-99671-0. LCCN 2007020613. OCLC 1200952036.
- Kellogg, Ann T. (2002). In an Influential Fashion: An Encyclopedia of Nineteenth- and Twentieth-Century Fashion Designers and Retailers Who Transformed Dress. Westport, Connecticut: Greenwood Publishing Group. ISBN 978-0-313-31220-5. LCCN 2001045124. OCLC 1059188379.
- Batchelor, Bob (2009). American Pop: Popular Culture Decade by Decade [4 Volumes]. Westport, Connecticut: Greenwood Publishing Group. ISBN 978-0-313-34410-7. LCCN 2008036699. OCLC 193174992.
- Peterson, Amy T.; Hewitt, Valerie; Kellogg, Ann T.; Lee, Heather Vaughan; Blanco F., José; Leff, Scott; Payne, Lynn (2008). The Greenwood Encyclopedia of Clothing Through American History, 1900 to the Present [2 Volumes]. Westport, Connecticut: Greenwood Publishing Group. ISBN 978-0-313-35855-5. OCLC 232001966.
- Thomas, Robert Bailey (1998). Old Farmer's Almanac 1999. Dublin, New Hampshire: Yankee Publishing, Inc. ISBN 978-1-57198-090-8. LCCN 2002208721. OCLC 51197324.
- Hill, Daniel Delis (2024). Dress and Identity in America: The Baby Boom Years 1946-1964. London: Bloomsbury Academic. ISBN 978-1-350-37391-4. LCCN 2024441833. OCLC 1377574008.
