= Corey House =

Corey House may refer to:

- Knight-Corey House, Boothbay, Maine, listed on the NRHP in Maine
- Timothy Corey House No. 1, Brookline, MA, listed on the NRHP in Massachusetts
- Timothy Corey House No. 2, Brookline, MA, listed on the NRHP in Massachusetts
- Corey House (Bridger, Montana), listed on the NRHP in Montana
- Corey Farm, Dublin, NH, listed on the NRHP in New Hampshire
- Corey House/Hotel, Grove, OK, listed on the NRHP in Oklahoma
