= Family Tree (magazine) =

American genealogy magazine

Family Tree Magazine
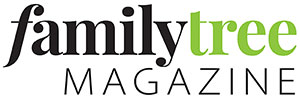
- Editor: Andrew Koch
- Categories: Genealogy, family history, hobbies
- Frequency: 6x year
- Total circulation: 70,000
- Founded: 1999
- First issue: January 2000
- Company: Yankee Publishing, Inc.
- Country: United States
- Based in: Cincinnati, Ohio
- Language: English
- Website: familytreemagazine.com
- ISSN: 0267-1131

Family Tree Magazine is a publication about genealogy and family history published by Yankee Publishing, Inc. in Blue Ash, Ohio and Dublin, New Hampshire. It has a paid circulation of about 70,000. The first issue was published in 2000, with David A. Fryxell as editor and later editor-in-chief. Allison (Stacy) Dolan and Diane Haddad also served as editors for the publication. Current editor Andrew Koch took on the role in December 2018.

Topics covered in Family Tree Magazine and on FamilyTreeMagazine.com include resource guides for specific ethnicities, annual website reviews, information on DNA tests and results, advice on genealogy records, research strategies, and how to share family history through projects and stories. The website also features an online store which offers genealogy research books, form downloads, and digitized past issues.

Family Tree Magazine was published by F+W until July 2019, when it was acquired by Yankee Publishing. After the sale, Yankee President and CEO Jamie Trowbridge stated Family Tree fit well with the company's suite of brands, which include Yankee, The Old Farmer's Almanac, and New Hampshire magazines as the first two include history in their editorial coverage.

The Family Tree podcast was launched in July 2008 with Lisa Louise Cooke, owner of Genealogy Gems LLC, serving as host. After a brief hiatus following F+W's bankruptcy, the podcast was relaunched in November 2019 with new episodes monthly.

In 2009, the brand's e-learning platform Family Tree University was created, offering online genealogy classes to readers and website users.

Family Tree's contributors include photo identification expert Maureen Taylor, storytelling expert Laura Hedgecock and biographer Rhonda Lauritzen.
