= David Hogan (composer) =

American composer and musical director

- Born: H. David Hogan; 1 July 1949; Nokesville, Virginia, U.S.
- Died: 17 July 1996 (aged 47); Atlantic Ocean off the coast of East Moriches, New York, U.S.
- Occupation: Composer
- Spouse: Terry Hogan Johnson
- Children: 1

H. David Hogan (July 1, 1949 – July 17, 1996) was an American composer and musical director of CIGAP (Le Choeur Int'l Gai de Paris), a choir composed of openly gay men.

Hogan and CIGAP baritone Jean-Paul Galland were killed when TWA Flight 800 exploded off the coast of Long Island, killing all 230 passengers and crew on board.

== Career ==
A native of Virginia, Hogan graduated from the Peabody Institute at Johns Hopkins University with a bachelor's degree in 1971, and would go on to earn a master's degree in voice in 1975. He would later help in the founding of The Walden School, a summer program based on the campus of Dublin School in Dublin, New Hampshire.

Prior to his work in France, Hogan helped develop the choir at San Francisco's St. Francis Lutheran Church.

When the previous musical director of CIGAP resigned three weeks before its auditions, Hogan was tapped to fill in the position.

During his career, Hogan had also been tenor soloist with the Washington National Cathedral (Episcopal) in Washington, DC.

== Personal life ==
Hogan was married to East Bay singer and choir conductor Terry Hogan Johnson. The couple had a daughter named Hilary, who also attended the Peabody Conservatory of Music in Baltimore.

== Choral works ==
- Magnificat and Nunc dimittis "Washington", unison treble or SATB/organ (written for the Choir Washington National Cathedral and Douglas Major)
- O Gracious Light, unison choir & organ.
- I love you, O my God most high, two-part mixed & keyboard.
