= James Gowing Farm =

Historic house in New Hampshire, United States

- U.S. National Register of Historic Places
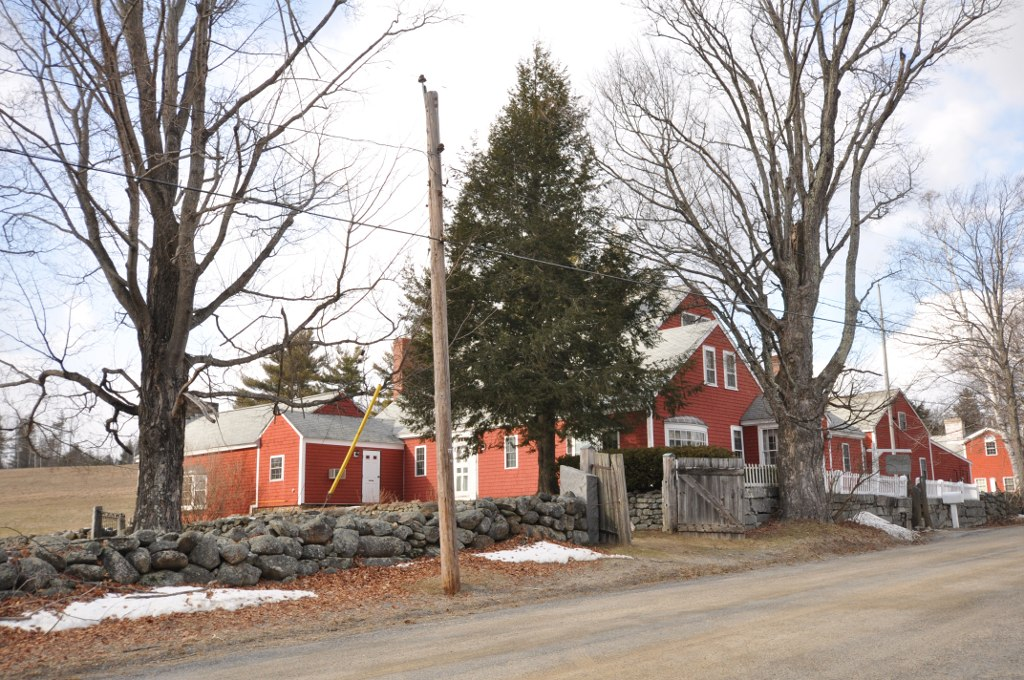

- Location within New Hampshire Location within the United States
- Location: Page Rd., Dublin, New Hampshire
- Coordinates: 42°52′41″N 72°2′13″W
- Area: 0.5 acres (0.20 ha)
- Built: 1788
- Built by: James Gowing, Jr. (original); Ned Pierce & Leonard "Nick" Williams (1930s renovation)
- Architect: Belknap & Weir, (1930s renovation)
- Architectural style: Colonial Revival
- MPS: Dublin MRA
- NRHP reference No.: 83004028
- Added to NRHP: December 18, 1983

The James Gowing Farm, also once known as Staghead Farm, is a historic farmstead on Page Road in Dublin, New Hampshire. It is now the centerpiece of the Dublin Christian Academy campus. The original 1 1/2-story Cape style house was built c. 1788 by James Gowing, Jr., not long after moving to the area. This structure is now part of a larger complex of buildings, many of which are Colonial Revival buildings built in the 1930s, when the house was also restored. The Joseph Gowing Farm, belonging to James Gowing's younger brother, is located nearby. The farmstead was listed on the National Register of Historic Places in 1983.

The property has had several interesting owners. James Gowing, Jr.'s son, Almerin, was a local militia leader and town selectman. The property was bought in 1853 by Samuel Hale, who served as Governor of New Hampshire 1882–83. In 1895 it was acquired by Louis Cabot (whose family manufactured Cabot Stain), who made it part of his large gentleman's farm. After deteriorating in the 1920s and 30s, the property was acquired by Mrs. Selina Riker, heir to the Riker Drug fortune in 1937. Mrs. Riker retained the firm of Belknap & Weir to design a Colonial Revival farm complex, of which the restored Gowing farmhouse became a part. Their design was developed as an extension of the Gowing house. The property was bought in 1954 by F. Nelson Blount, the president of the Ocean Spray cooperative. Blount donated the property for the establishment of the Dublin Christian Academy in 1964.

== See also ==
- National Register of Historic Places listings in Cheshire County, New Hampshire
