= AncientFaces =

Photo-sharing genealogical website

AncientFaces llc
- Industry: Genealogy
- Founded: San Jose, California (September 2000)
- Founder: Daniel J. Pinna, Carlos Filipe Medeiros
- Area served: Worldwide
- Products: Photo Sharing, People Biographies, Family Trees
- Website: www.ancientfaces.com

AncientFaces is a free online platform dedicated to sharing vintage and historical photographs. Its stated mission is to build a "portrait of our past" by allowing users to upload, view, and discuss photographs of their ancestors. The website was founded in 2000 in California by Daniel J. Pinna and Carlos Filipe Medeiros.

AncientFaces serves genealogists and history enthusiasts by providing a collaborative space to share and preserve old photographs. Although the website does not date or authenticate photos, it supports genealogical research by helping users connect images to family histories. Professionals such as Maureen Taylor have specialized in identifying and analyzing vintage photographs for genealogical purposes.

In January 2013, AncientFaces was ranked as the 15th most popular genealogy website worldwide, and noted for having one of the largest increases in online traffic among genealogy sites in 2012. The website was also recognized by Family Tree Magazine as one of the "101 Best Genealogy Websites of 2012."
