= Parsons Studio and Casino =

Historic building in New Hampshire, United States

- U.S. National Register of Historic Places
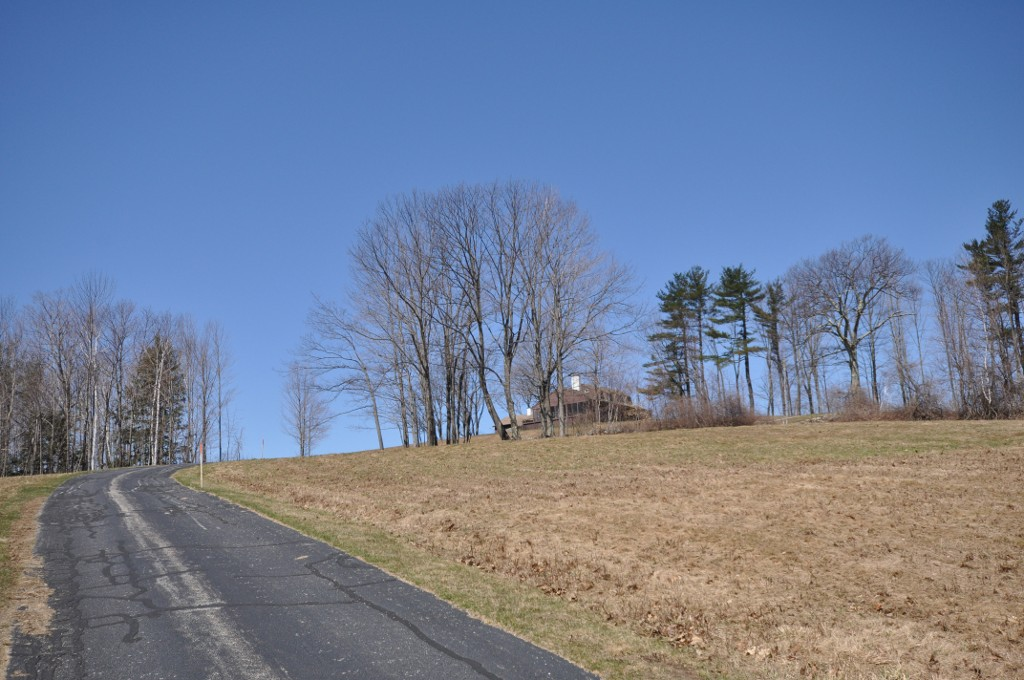

- Location within New Hampshire Location within the United States
- Location: Parsons Rd., Dublin, New Hampshire
- Coordinates: 42°53′7″N 72°3′7″W
- Area: 1.4 acres (0.57 ha)
- Built: 1903
- Architect: A.R. James
- Architectural style: Shingle Style
- MPS: Dublin MRA
- NRHP reference No.: 83004058
- Added to NRHP: December 18, 1983

The Parsons Studio and Casino is a historic house on Parsons Road in Dublin, New Hampshire. Built about 1903 as an entertainment space and enlarged several times as a residence and art studio, it is a good example of Shingle style architecture from Dublin's heyday as a summer resort and artists' colony. The house was listed on the National Register of Historic Places in 1983.

== Description and history ==
The former Parsons Studio and Casino is located in a rural setting southeast of Dublin's village center, atop a rise west of Parsons Road near its southern end. Its major elements form a rough S shape, with a central two-story section that has projecting single-story wings. The central section is 2 1/2 stories in height, with a gambrel roof and shingled exterior. Porches shelter three elevations, providing views to Mount Monadnock to the southwest, and to the hills of Peterborough to the east. The gambrel roof is pierced by gabled dormers. The wings, although they are later additions, are stylistically in keeping with the main block.

The main block of this house was built c. 1903, and was originally located near the Maplecote property down the hill from its present site. It was originally used as an entertainment house by the Parsons family, and was converted for use as an art studio by Georgianna Parsons. About 1960, then-owner George Macomber had the building hauled by sled from its original location to the present site. It was sensitively extended in both 1967-68 and 1973–74.

== See also ==
- National Register of Historic Places listings in Cheshire County, New Hampshire
