= Yankee (magazine) =

American magazine devoted to New England travel, home, food and features

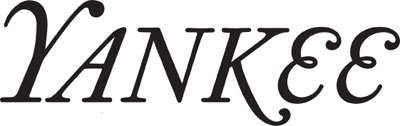
- Editor: Mel Allen
- Categories: Regional magazine
- Frequency: Once every two months
- Publisher: Yankee Publishing, Inc.
- Total circulation (2024): 233,854
- Founder: Robb Sagendorph
- Founded: 1935
- First issue: September 1935
- Company: Yankee Publishing Incorporated
- Country: United States
- Based in: Dublin, New Hampshire
- Language: English
- Website: newengland.com/yankee-magazine/
- ISSN: 0044-0191

Yankee is a bimonthly (once every two months) magazine about lifestyle, travel and culture in the New England region of the United States, based in Dublin, New Hampshire. The first issue appeared in September 1935. It has a paid circulation of below 300,000 in 2015, from a peak of one million in the 1980s.

== Yankee Publishing Inc. ==
It is published by Yankee Publishing Incorporated (YPI), one of the few remaining family-owned and independent magazine publishers in the United States. YPI also owns the oldest continuously produced periodical in the US, the Old Farmer's Almanac, which it purchased in 1939. In 2013, YPI acquired McLean Communications, publisher of New Hampshire and the New Hampshire Business Review. It is a member of the City and Regional Magazine Association.
