= Dublin Seminar for New England Folklife =

The Dublin Seminar for New England Folklife is an annual series of conferences and publications that explores everyday life, culture, work, folklore, material culture and traditions in New England's past.

== History ==
First hosted by the Dublin School in Dublin, New Hampshire, on June 19 and 20, 1976, the Dublin Seminar is an annual gathering of avocational and professional scholars (academics, curators, librarians and others) as well as students and enthusiasts who convene each year around a topic in the history and material culture of New England. It was established when Peter Benes, then a graduate student in Boston University’s American & New England Studies Program, organized a gathering of scholars interested in early New England gravestones; initially planned for about forty participants, by the time the seminar occurred some 116 scholars, curators, preservationists and enthusiasts had assembled to hear nineteen lectures.

Participants in this event went on to form the Association for Gravestone Studies. Plans were made to convene the following year as well, around the topic of New England archaeology. The Seminar convened in various locations in its early years, including the Concord Museum, the University of New Hampshire, and other venues; the Seminar met in Deerfield, Massachusetts, as early as 1982 for the "Foodways in the Northeast" gathering, in association with Historic Deerfield, and began meeting regularly in Deerfield after 1987, where it continues to meet today.

== Activities ==
The first Proceedings, Puritan Gravestone Art, edited by Peter Benes, was published jointly by Boston University and The Dublin Seminar for New England Folklife, in 1977, and included landmark articles like David D. Hall, "The Gravestone Image as a Puritan Cultural Code." Jane Montague Benes began serving as associate editor of the Seminar's annual proceedings by the seminar's second year. The Dublin Seminar proceedings were associated with Boston University until Historic Deerfield became its partner and co-sponsor in 2008.

== Impact ==
Since 1976, the seminar has hosted almost 750 scholarly presentations at its annual meeting and published nearly 400 articles in its annual Proceedings, including work by leading historians including Kevin M. Sweeney, Laurel Thatcher Ulrich, Jane Nylander and Abbott Lowell Cummings.[2] In 2011, Dublin Seminar founders Peter and Jane Montague Benes received the Bay State Legacy Award for their contribution to scholarship. In 2014, they were recognized with a Leadership in History Award from the American Association for State and Local History.

== Proceedings and Occasional Publications ==
Puritan Gravestone Art (1976)

New England Historical Archeology (1977)

Puritan Gravestone Art II (1978)

New England Meeting House and Church, 1630-1850 (1979)

New England Prospect: Maps, Place Names, and the Historic Landscape (1980)

The Bay and the River: 1600-1900 (1981)

Foodways in the Northeast (1982)

American Speech, 1600 to the Present (1983)

Itinerancy in New England and New York (1984)

Families and Children (1985)

The Farm (1986)

Early American Probate Inventories (1987)

House and Home (1988)

New England / New France: 1600-1850 (1989)

Medicine and Healing (1990)

Algonkians of New England: Past and Present (1991)

Wonders of the Invisible World, 1600-1900 (1992)

New England’s Creatures: 1400-1900 (1993)

Painting and Portrait Making in the American Northeast (1994)

Plants and People (1995)

New England Music: The Public Sphere, 1600-1900 (1996)

Textiles in Early New England: Design, Production and Consumption (1997)

Rural New England Furniture: People, Place and Production (1998)

Textiles in New England II: Four Centuries of Material Life (1999)

New England Celebrates: Spectacle, Commemoration, and Festivity (2000)

Women’s Work in New England 1620-1920 (2001)

The Worlds of Children, 1620-1920 (2002)

Slavery/Antislavery in New England (2003)

New England Collectors and Collections (2004)

Life on the Streets and Commons, 1600 to the Present (2005)

In Our Own Words: New England Diaries, 1600 to the Present, Diary Diversity, Coming of Age (2006)

In Our Own Words: New England Diaries, 1600 to the Present 2, Neighborhoods, War, Travel, and History (2007)

New England and the Caribbean (2008)

Waterways and Byways, 1600-1890 (2009)

Dressing New England: Clothing, Fashion, and Identity (2010) [co-sponsored by the Costume Society of America]

Beyond the Battlefield: New England and the Civil War (2011)

The Irish in New England (2012)

Foodways in the Northeast II (2013)

Let the Games Begin: Sports and Recreation in New England (2014)

Schooldays in New England: 1650-1900 (2015)

New England at Sea: Maritime Memory and Material Culture (2016)

Small World: Toys, Dolls and Games in New England (2017)

Religious Spaces: Our Vanishing Landmarks (2018)

Entertainments at Taverns and Long Rooms in New England, 1700-1900 (2019)

Living With Disabilities in New England, 1630-1930 (2021)

Occasional Publications

Amelia F. Miller. Connecticut River Valley Doorways: An Eighteenth-Century Flowering (1983)

Peter Benes. Charles Delin: Port Painter of Maastricht and Amsterdam (1987)

Alan Clark Buechner. Yankee Singing Schools and the Golden Age of Choral Music in New England, 1760-1800 (2003)
