= Eveleth Farm =

Historic house in New Hampshire, United States

- U.S. National Register of Historic Places
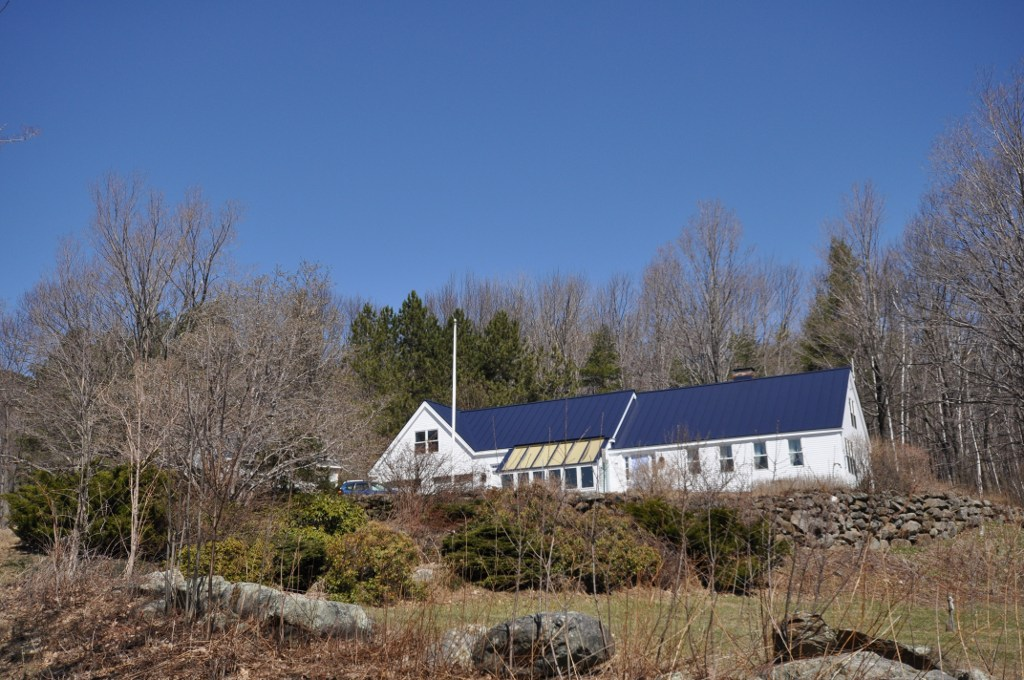

- Location within New Hampshire Location within the United States
- Location: Burpee Rd., Dublin, New Hampshire
- Coordinates: 42°52′20″N 72°4′24″W
- Area: less than one acre
- Built: 1822
- Built by: Eveleth, Joab; Monahon, Richard
- Architectural style: Cape Cod
- MPS: Dublin MRA
- NRHP reference No.: 83004020
- Added to NRHP: December 18, 1983

Eveleth Farm is a historic farmstead on Burpee Road in Dublin, New Hampshire, United States. Built about 1823 and enlarged in 1980, it is a well-preserved example of an early hill farmstead, noted for its association with Henry David Thoreau, who visited the farm during a stay in Dublin in 1852. The house was listed on the National Register of Historic Places in 1983.

== Description and history ==
Eveleth Farm is located at the end of Burpee Road, which extends westward from Upper Jaffrey Road up the eastern slopes of Mount Monadnock. The farmstead is a 1 1/2-story wood-frame structure oriented facing south, with a gabled roof and clapboarded exterior. The original main block is five bays wide, with sash windows in the right four bays, and the main entrance in the leftmost bay, all simply trimmed. A modern addition of similar height extends to the west, culminating in a garage; the addition is fronted by an all-glass greenhouse.

The house was built about 1823 by Joab Eveleth on land acquired from his brother-in-law, Samuel Gowing. Eveleth's son Joseph hosted Henry David Thoreau here on a walking trip through the region in 1852. The house was owned by members of the local Burpee and Harrington families until 1957. A 19th-century barn on the property was destroyed in the New England Hurricane of 1938. The addition, built in 1981, is the work of post-modern architect Richard Monahon, who designed it to be sympathetic to the extant period house while still being openly modern.

== See also ==
- National Register of Historic Places listings in Cheshire County, New Hampshire
