= Corey Farm =

Historic house in New Hampshire, United States

- U.S. National Register of Historic Places
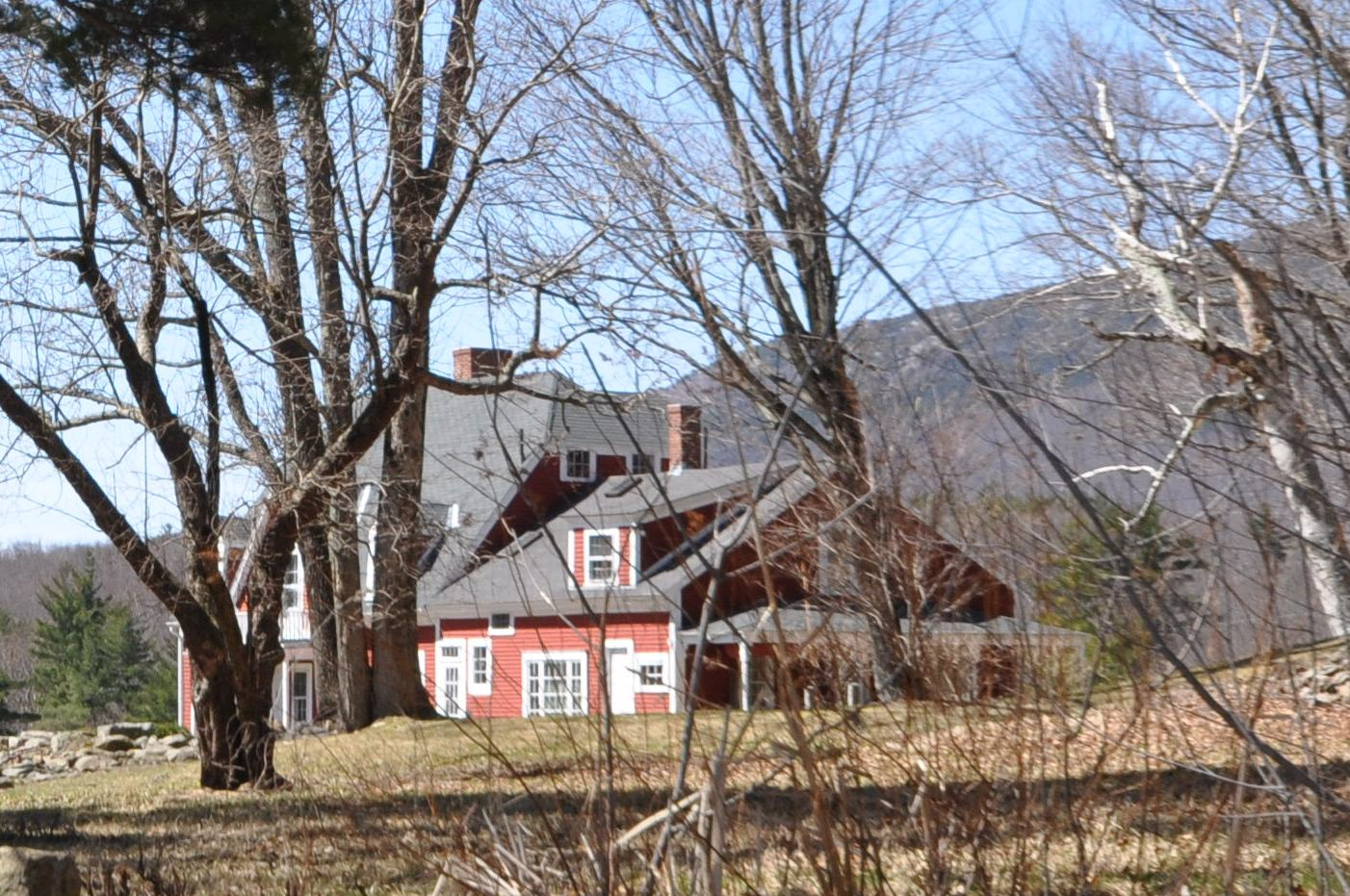

- Location within New Hampshire Location within the United States
- Location: Parsons Rd., Dublin, New Hampshire
- Coordinates: 42°53′1″N 72°2′59″W
- Area: 1.7 acres (0.69 ha)
- Built: 1816
- Built by: Corey, Moses
- Architectural style: Colonial Revival
- MPS: Dublin MRA
- NRHP reference No.: 83004017
- Added to NRHP: December 15, 1983

Corey Farm, also known as Maplecote and Interbrook, is a historic farmstead and summer house on Parsons Road in Dublin, New Hampshire. Built about 1816 and enlarged later in the 19th century, it is a picturesque example of the adaptation of an older farm property for use as a summer estate. The house was listed on the National Register of Historic Places in 1983.

== Description and history ==
Corey Farm is located in a rural location of central Dublin, east of Mount Monadnock, down a winding lane off the end of Parsons Road. It is a rambling 2 1/2-story wood-frame structure, with a clipped gable roof and clapboarded exterior. The roof is pierced on its front and rear faces by a variety of gable- and hip-roof dormers. Windows are of differing dimensions and somewhat random placement, and a single-story gabled ell extends to the right. The left rear corner has two levels of porches.

The oldest portion of this rambling 2 1/2-story wood-frame house was built c. 1816 by Moses Corey, a farmer, on land purchased from his father-in-law. Corey was prominent in local affairs, serving on the board of selectmen and the school committee. He sold the farm in 1850. Mrs. William Parsons purchased the property in 1889, and began its transformation into a gentleman's farm, part of a larger complex of properties owned by that family. This house was occupied by her daughter, artist Georgianna Parsons (who later built the nearby Parsons Studio and Casino). A 20th-century owner of the property was Ernest J. Simmons, a professor of Slavic Languages at Columbia University.

== See also ==
- National Register of Historic Places listings in Cheshire County, New Hampshire
