= New Hampshire Business Review =

- Type: Biweekly business newspaper
- Owner: Yankee Publishing
- Founded: 1978
- Language: English
- ISSN: 0164-8152
- Website: nhbr.com

New Hampshire Business Review is a bi-monthly publication, published on newsprint and based in Manchester, covering business-related issues in New Hampshire.

New Hampshire Business Review started in 1978, and was purchased from the Madden family of New London, New Hampshire by Pennsylvania-based Independent Publications, Inc. which also owned the Telegraph of Nashua, the state's second-largest daily newspaper, and the monthly magazine New Hampshire, in 2001. Yankee Publishing acquired IPI subsidiary McLean Communications, publisher of New Hampshire and the New Hampshire Business Review, in 2013.

Like most business publications, New Hampshire Business Review includes breaking news, features and commentary, while its website includes regularly updated links to articles at other websites.
