= Joseph Gowing Farm =

Historic house in New Hampshire, United States

- U.S. National Register of Historic Places
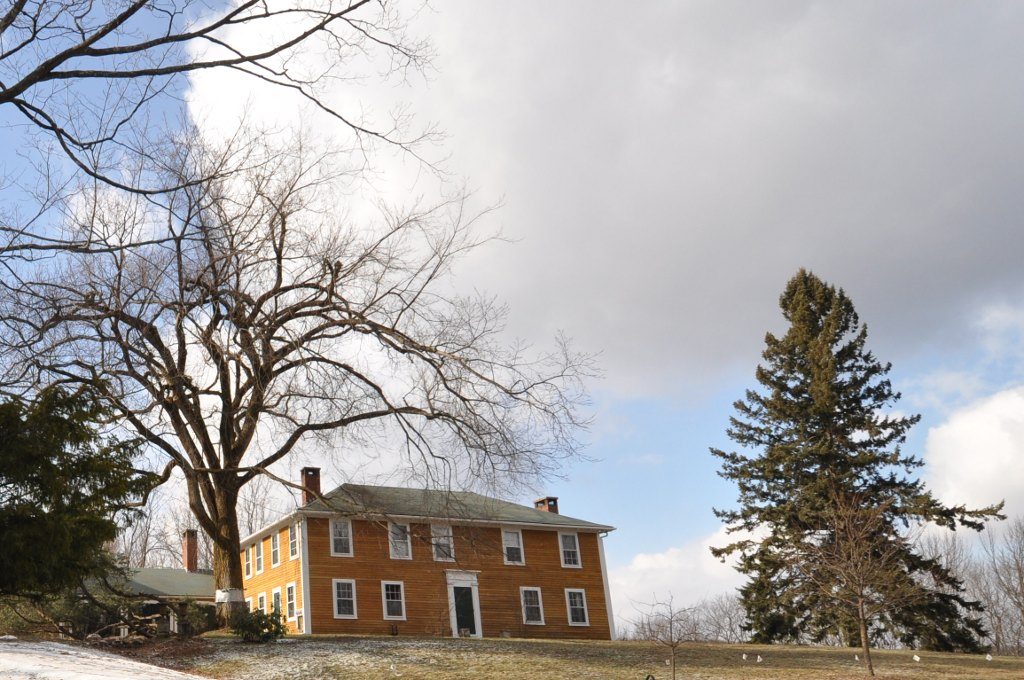

- Location within New Hampshire Location within the United States
- Location: Page Rd., Dublin, New Hampshire
- Coordinates: 42°52′53″N 72°2′13″W
- Area: 2.7 acres (1.1 ha)
- Built: 1793
- Architectural style: Colonial Revival
- MPS: Dublin MRA
- NRHP reference No.: 83004029
- Added to NRHP: December 15, 1983

The Joseph Gowing Farm is a historic farmhouse on Page Road in Dublin, New Hampshire. Built in 1908 as part of a gentleman's farm, it is a reconstruction of a late-18th century farmhouse, and a good example of Georgian Revival architecture. The house was listed on the National Register of Historic Places in 1983.

== Description and history ==
The Joseph Gowing Farm is located in a rural setting of southeastern Dublin, on the west side of Page Road about 0.3 miles (0.48 km) southwest of its junction with Windmill Hill Road. It is a two-story wood-frame structure, with a hip roof and clapboarded exterior. The front facade faces east, and has a slightly asymmetrical arrangement of windows around the center entrance. The entry is framed by pilasters and a corniced entablature. The building is connected by a single-story ell to a large 19th-century barn with cupola.

The house was built in 1908, reconstructing a c. 1793 farmhouse that was destroyed by fire. It was built by Louis Cabot, an industrialist who owned a large gentleman's farm, whose manager occupied this house. The structure is technically Georgian Revival, as it is a reconstruction, but it is supposedly faithful to the original, which had added Federal style details, including corner pilasters and a bracketed cornice. The original house, in addition to its association with the locally prominent Gowing family, was also owned by Governor Samuel Hale before becoming part of the Cabot farm.

== See also ==
- National Register of Historic Places listings in Cheshire County, New Hampshire
