= Yankee Publishing, Inc. =

American publishing company

- Status: Active
- Founded: 1935
- Founder: Robb Sagendorph
- Country of origin: United States
- Headquarters location: Dublin, New Hampshire, U.S.
- Key people: Jamie Trowbridge, President
- Publication types: Books, calendars, magazines
- Nonfiction topics: Almanacs, Travelogues, Journalism, Magazines
- No. of employees: 85
- Official website: www.ypi.com

Yankee Publishing, Inc. is a publisher of books, magazines, calendars, and other periodicals, based in Dublin, New Hampshire, United States.

== History ==
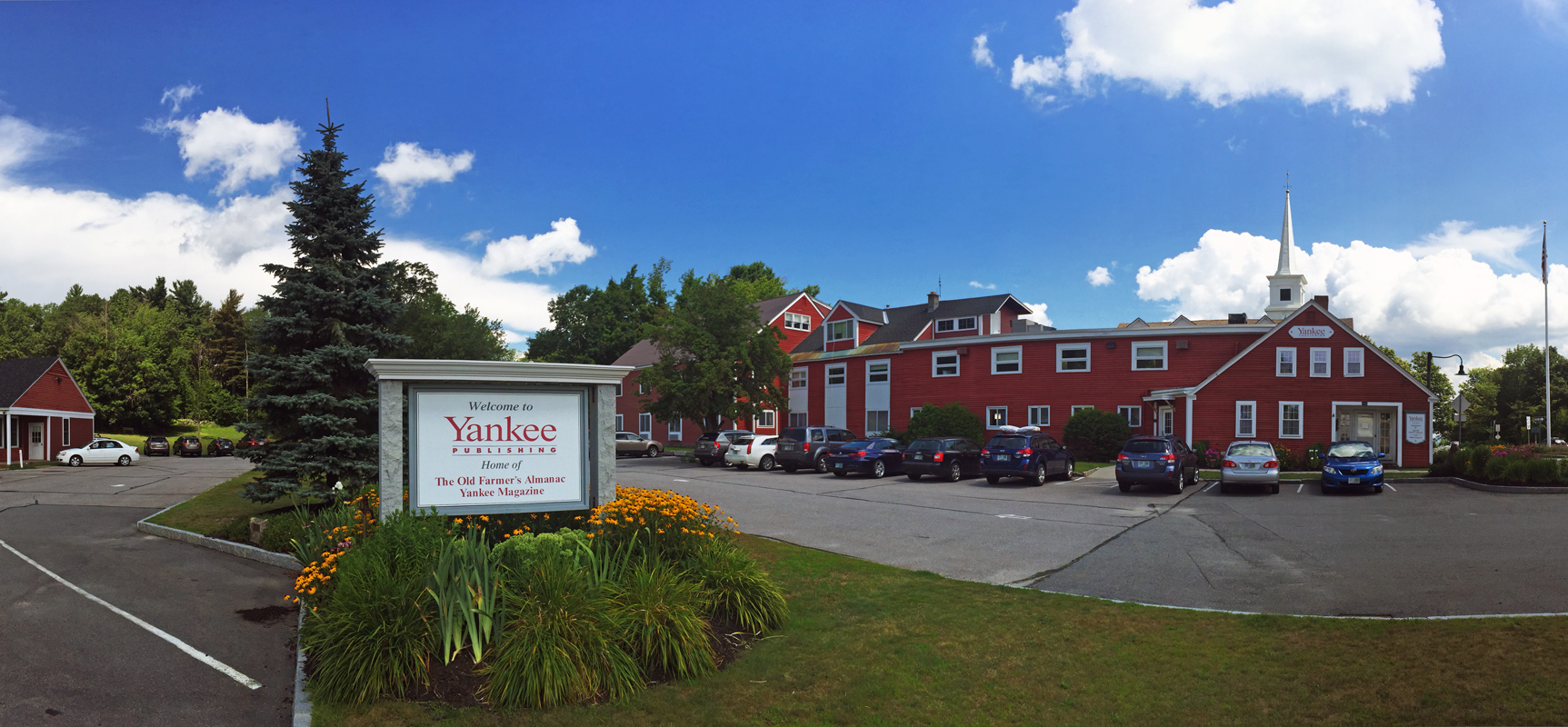
Yankee Publishing headquarters

Yankee Publishing, Inc. (YPI) was founded by Robb Sagendorph with his wife, Beatrix, in 1935 with the publication of the first issue of Yankee Magazine.

Four years later, in 1939, Sagendorph purchased the Old Farmer's Almanac, the country's oldest continuously published periodical. Now 200+ years old, the publication is more widely read than at any time in its history.

YPI is a 100% employee-owned business, run out of the same barn-red building where it was founded.

In 2013, YPI expanded their offerings by acquiring McLean Communications, which includes New Hampshire magazine and New Hampshire Business Review.

The company has shifted some of its focus into offering custom publishing services.

In July 2019, Yankee Publishing acquired Family Tree Magazine. After the sale, Yankee President and CEO Jamie Trowbridge stated Family Tree fit well with the company's suite of brands, which include Yankee, The Old Farmer's Almanac, and New Hampshire magazines. Trowbridge also noted that, “[both] Yankee and The Old Farmer’s Almanac are publications that include history in their editorial coverage. Family Tree’s coverage of family history is a nice fit.”

In March 2026, Yankee Publishing Inc. announced that Ernesto Burden, then-publisher of NH Business Review and New Hampshire Magazine, would succeed as CEO.

== Publications and products ==
Yankee Publishing, Inc. publishes books, magazines, and newspapers in genres such as almanacs, home & garden, business, culture, interior design, cooking, children's books, gardening, bridal, fiction, food, travel, and advice.

Periodicals published by Yankee Publishing include:

- Yankee
- Old Farmer's Almanac
- Family Tree
- New Hampshire
- New Hampshire Business Review
- New Hampshire Home
- New Hampshire Parenting
- New Hampshire Bride

In addition to traditional media brands, Yankee Publishing maintains a number of online resources and social media including:

- Almanac.com
- NewEngland.com
- FamilyTreeMagazine.com
- YankeeCustomMarketing.com
- Almanac4Kids.com
- McleanCommunications.com
