= Dublin Christian Academy =

Coordinates: 42°52′43″N 72°2′13″W

Location
- 106 Page Road; Dublin, New Hampshire 03444; United States

Information
- School type: Private, boarding and day
- Motto: Qui esse sumus nunc venimus (What we are to be, We are now becoming)
- Denomination: Non-denominational
- Established: 1964
- CEEB code: 300144
- President: Eric Moody
- Teaching staff: 11 (2015-16)
- Grades: K-12
- Gender: Co-educational
- Enrollment: 97 (2015-16)
- Student to teacher ratio: 8.2 (2015-16)
- Campus size: 200 acres (0.81 km^{2})
- Campus type: Rural
- Colors: Blue and Gold
- Mascot: Stag
- Website: www.dublinchristian.org

Dublin Christian Academy is a private Christian school in Dublin, New Hampshire. Founded in 1964, it accepts students from kindergarten through 12th grade.

== History ==
In 1954 F. Nelson Blount purchased James Gowing Farm to live a country lifestyle and work on his newfound Christian faith with his family. The Blount family decided to devote their farm to God and provide Christian education in the Monadnock region. Florida pastor Melvin Moody and his brother Leon Moody were brought in as school administrators and the school opened on September 8, 1964.

== Extracurricular activities ==
Student organizations and activities include an art association, chorale, drama, and Team America Rocketry Challenge.

== Former presidents ==
- Dr. Melvin Moody
- Dr. Leon Moody, 1995-2004
- Mr. Kevin Moody, 2004-2015
