= The Walden School =

Coordinates: 42°54′30″N 72°03′47″W

The Walden School is an organization which runs summer music education programs. It is based in Dublin, New Hampshire and has a year-round office in San Francisco, California. Since its founding in 1972, the Walden School has operated the Young Musicians Program, a 5-week long summer camp and concert series, which is the only summer program dedicated specifically to young composers in the United States. Students aged 9 to 18 study musical composition, along with a unique curriculum of music theory, specialty electives, and chorus. In 2011 the Walden School began running the Creative Musicians Retreat, an 8-day long program for adult musicians from all backgrounds to study choral music, composition, performance, and pedagogy. Both programs take place on the campus of the Dublin School, and they both feature visiting professional ensembles who help to perform new music written by participants, as well as composers-in-residence who inspire and mentor the participants. The Young Musicians Program also puts on a choral concert at the conclusion of the program. Along with participants from the United States, in recent years attendees have come from countries such as Cyprus, Israel, Mexico, China, India, Estonia, Canada, Serbia, and Venezuela.

== History ==
The Walden School was co-founded in 1972 by David Hogan, Pamela Layman Quist, and Lynn Taylor Hebden following the death of Grace Newsom Cushman, the founder of the Junior Conservatory Camp (also commonly referred to as the "JCC"). The JCC was founded in the 1940s in Baltimore, Maryland, and was considered the spiritual predecessor camp of The Walden School. The Walden School, which began in Reisterstown, Maryland, was situated on the campus of the Mountain School from 1976 to 1982, a small rural private boarding school in Vershire, Vermont. In 1983, due to the impending sale of the Mountain School, Walden moved to the Dublin School in Dublin, New Hampshire, where it has been held ever since. On July 17, 1996, David Hogan was one of the victims of the TWA Flight 800 crash.

== Methodology ==
=== Philosophy ===
The Walden academic curriculum and teaching methodology is based on a core philosophy which employs a comprehensive and organic approach to learning music, emphasizing creativity in all aspects of the curriculum. The Walden School's general philosophy defines music as "sound organized in time."

=== Musicianship ===
In the Walden School's Musicianship Course students simultaneously learn singing, playing, writing, and improvising music. The Musicianship course teaches the elements of music more or less in the order that they were developed, and starts with the existential question of "what is music?" Students then proceed through a process of discovery beginning with the overtone series and improvisations inside the piano. This method of teaching musicianship breaks with conventional methods of music education, most notably in The Walden School's teaching of intervals and modes before teaching functional harmony. The Walden School has recently published a textbook titled The Walden School Musicianship Course: A Manual for Teachers about its methodology.

=== Composition ===
Walden School alumni see Walden as a "composition camp", although technically composition is not at the core of the Walden curriculum. The method employed by composition teachers depends on the level of the student. In beginner classes comprising new and inexperienced students, a more improvisation-oriented approach is taken. More advanced classes take an open-ended approach, in that students are encouraged to compose any style they please while simultaneously receiving guidance from their composition teacher on orchestration and notation techniques.

=== Computer music ===
Computer music was added to the Walden School Musicianship and Composition curriculum in 2000, when a computer lab was first installed. The lab uses Apple Power Mac computers, each supplied with Digidesign Mbox hardware and Reaper software. Students use a Digital Audio Tape (DAT) recorder with a stereo microphone to record sounds, and then later upload these recordings to the Power Macs and begin composing electronic pieces primarily using Reaper software. Other popular pieces of software used among Walden School students to manipulate the sounds they record are Soundhack. Max/MSP is a more sophisticated digital audio signal processing application and is used exclusively among the Walden School faculty.

=== Faculty Commissioning Project ===
The Walden School Faculty are active composers, performers and educators. The Faculty Commissioning Project offers opportunities for collaborating with resident musicians and premiering new works.

== Past Walden School directors ==
- 2004–present Seth Brenzel
  - 1996–2003 Patricia Plude
  - 1994–1995 Stephen Coxe
  - 1983–1994 Pamela Layman Quist
  - 1972–1982 David Hogan
