= Timothy Corey House No. 1 =

Historic house in Massachusetts, United States

- U.S. National Register of Historic Places
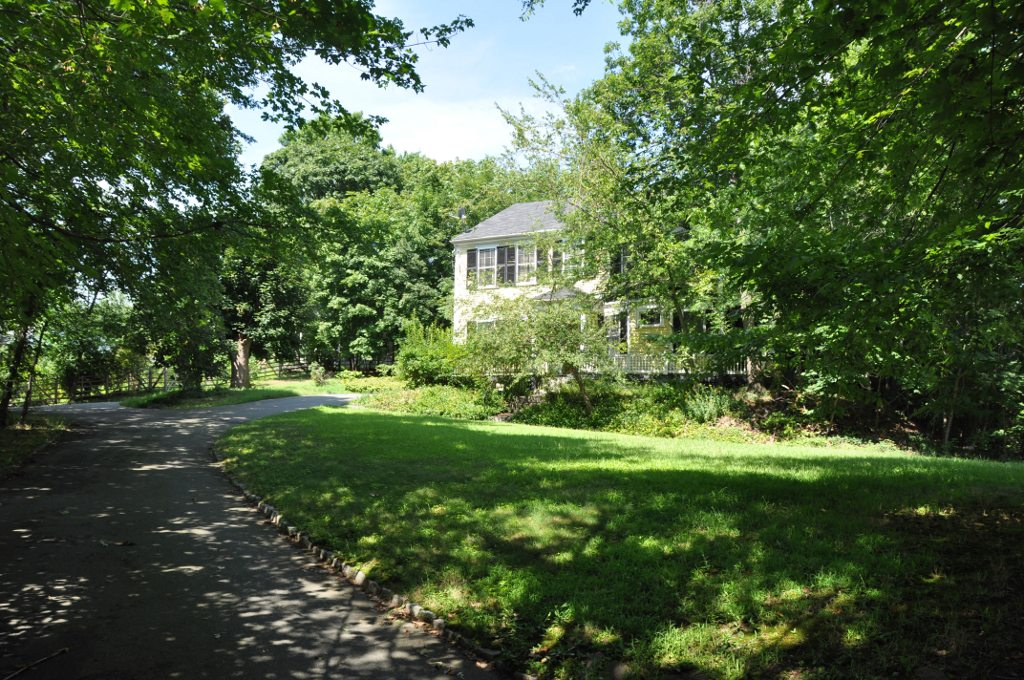

- Location within Massachusetts Location within the United States
- Location: 808 Washington St., Brookline, Massachusetts
- Coordinates: 42°20′29″N 71°8′22″W
- Built: 1806
- Architectural style: Federal
- MPS: Brookline MRA
- NRHP reference No.: 85003255
- Added to NRHP: October 17, 1985

The Timothy Corey House No. 1 is a historic house at 808 Washington Street in Brookline, Massachusetts. Built in 1806, it is a good example of vernacular Federal architecture, and was home for over a century to members of one of the town's most prominent early families. The house was listed on the National Register of Historic Places in 1985.

== Description and history ==
The Timothy Corey House No. 1 is located in Brookline's Corey Hill neighborhood, on the south side of Washington Street just west of its junction with Downing Street. It is a 2 1/2-story wood-frame structure with a side-gable roof and clapboarded exterior, set back from the road on a rise with a low stone retaining wall at the sidewalk. It is five bays wide and two deep. A single-story open porch extends across the front, which was probably added c. 1920, with a covered portico above the center entrance.

This house was built c. 1806 for Deacon Timothy Corey, cofounder of the first Baptist Church in Brookline. The Corey family were prominent landowners in the area, for whom Corey Hill is named. The family had owned land in this area since the 1760s, and ran a successful farm and orchard. The house passed out of the family in 1919, when Timothy Corey's spinster daughter Abie willed it to a local church. It is one of the town's few reminders of a once agrarian past.

== See also ==
- Timothy Corey House No. 2
- National Register of Historic Places listings in Brookline, Massachusetts
