= Dublin School =

Coordinates: 42°54′31″N 72°03′48″W

- Dublin, New Hampshire; United States

Information
- Type: Independent college preparatory boarding/day school
- Motto: Truth and Courage
- Established: 1935
- Head of School: Sam Bicknell
- Faculty: 35
- Enrollment: Approximately 160
- Average class size: 10
- Student to teacher ratio: 5:1
- Campus type: Rural
- Mascot: Wildcats
- Website: www.dublinschool.org

The Dublin School is an independent college-preparatory school with a student body of approximately 160 students. It is located in the United States in Dublin, New Hampshire, near Dublin Pond and Mount Monadnock. Approximately 70% of the student body are boarding students.

== History ==
The school was founded in September 1935 by Paul Lehmann, who owned and operated the school with his wife, Nancy. In the school's first year, there were eight students and six faculty. From its opening up until the Lehmanns' retirement in 1970, the student population mainly consisted of boys.

The Dublin School hosted the first Dublin Seminar for New England Folklife in 1976.

In 1983, Dublin began to host The Walden School, a summer music school.

== Academics ==
Courses include chemistry, biology, marine biology, algebra, pre-calculus, calculus, statistics, Spanish, world history, American history, economics and English, thirteen AP courses, and various electives in each category. When unable to find a desired course, students may start an "independent study".

In order to graduate, a student needs 3 years of high school math including Algebra II, 3 years of high school science including Biology and Chemistry, two years of high school language in the same language, two years of arts, and two trimester elective courses including Technology and Ethics, which replaced Tech and Design.

Dublin School also provides various extra-curricular activities including musicals, drama, orchestra, and the other performing arts.

== Campus ==
The school is located on over 500 acres (200 ha) with over 15 miles (24 km) of hiking, mountain biking, and Nordic skiing trails. Dublin has seven dormitories: Monadnock House, Slopeside, Corner House, Lehmann, Hoyt-Horner, Wing and Hollow, and New Dorm. Slopeside was completed during the 2017-18 school year to replace the aging Hill House Dormitory.

In addition to traditional classrooms, specialized facilities include the Fountain Arts Building with state of the art sound and light equipment and an outdoor performance space for spring concerts; Gillespie Hall, home to the Putnam Gallery, Spencer Student Center, and the Christopher R. Horgan Art Studio with dedicated space for advanced art portfolio students, and a high-tech computer lab for digital photography and filmmaking; the Perkin Observatory; a robotics labs and maker space; a music and recording studio; the Griffin Learning Center; and a Writers' Cottage.

Athletic facilities include two full size soccer/lacrosse fields; the Norm Wight Ski Hill with snowmaking, lift and lights; a Nordic ski complex with over 7.5 kilometers (4.7 mi) of fully homologated racing trails; the Whitney Gymnasium and health center with seasonal turf field; the Outdoor Center with ski building shop; an Adirondack-style boathouse (sailing) on Dublin Lake; the Christopher Horgan Tennis Center; and the Steele Family Boathouse (crew) on Thorndike Pond.
