= Timothy Corey House No. 2 =

Historic house in Massachusetts, United States

- U.S. National Register of Historic Places
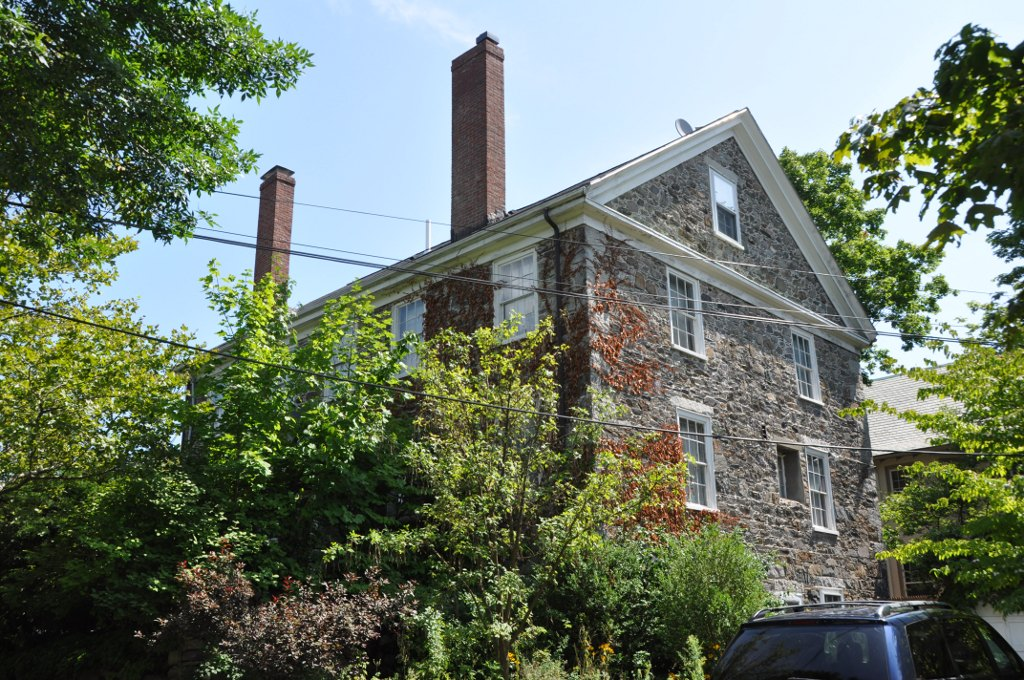

- Location within Massachusetts
- Location: 786–788 Washington St., Brookline, Massachusetts
- Coordinates: 42°20′29″N 71°8′21″W
- Area: less than one acre
- Built: 1843
- Architectural style: Greek Revival
- MPS: Brookline MRA
- NRHP reference No.: 85003256
- Added to NRHP: October 17, 1985

The Timothy Corey House No. 2 is a historic house at 786–788 Washington Street in Brookline, Massachusetts. Built in 1843, it is one of Brookline's few stone houses. It is a vernacular Greek Revival in style, and was home to members of one of the town's most prominent early families. It was listed on the National Register of Historic Places on October 17, 1985.

== Description and history ==
The Timothy Corey House No. 2 stands in Brookline's residential Corey Hill neighborhood, on the south side of Washington Street at its southeast corner with Downing Street. It is a 2 1/2-story structure, built out of fieldstone and covered by a gabled roof. The gable ends, also finished in stone, are fully pedimented, and the roof is pierced by two interior chimneys. It has a five-bay front facade, with a center entrance sheltered by a 20th-century portico.

The house was built in 1843 for Deacon Timothy Corey; his first house stands nearby at 808 Washington Street. The house is locally distinctive for its construction material, since stone has historically been rarely used in house construction in the area. Stylistically it is a vernacular interpretation of the Greek Revival. The house was built on land that was in the Corey family's hands since the 1760s, and was supposedly built on the site of the house built by Timothy Corey's father.

== See also ==
- National Register of Historic Places listings in Brookline, Massachusetts
