= Maureen Taylor (genealogist) =

Maureen Alice Taylor
- Occupation: Photo historian
- Known for: Genealogy

Maureen Alice Taylor (born April 14, 1956) is an American genealogist, author, and public speaker based in Providence, Rhode Island. Her work combines expertise in genealogy, art history, costume history, and cultural anthropology. Taylor has written numerous books and articles for magazines and maintains a professional blog on historical photography and family research. The Wall Street Journal has referred to her as "the nation's foremost historical photo detective."

== Education and career ==
Taylor holds a B.A. and an M.A. in history from Rhode Island College. She discovered a portrait of Dorothy Catherine Draper from 1839, which she believes to be the first American family photo. She has been widely featured in US national print media and television, including The Today Show, The View, the Boston Globe and MSNBC.

Taylor is the author of a guide to family history for children, Through the Eyes of Your Ancestors (Houghton Mifflin, 1999). Voice of Youth Advocacy named Through the Eyes of Your Ancestors to its best nonfiction list for 1999. "Taylor works with children as young as second grade to create simple family trees or charts. But give the kids a wealth of art supplies, she says, and kids will come up with their own creative expressions."

Taylor worked for the Rhode Island Historical Society, The New England Historic Genealogical Society, and Houghton Mifflin. She is a former president of the Rhode Island Genealogical Society.

Taylor is the author of 11 books and an active blogger. She also acts as contributing editor to Family Tree Magazine.

== Work ==
Taylor's work includes:

- Taylor, Maureen. Preserving Your Family Photographs: How to Care for Your Family Photographs - From Daguerreotypes to Digital Imaging. Westwood, MA: Picture Perfect Press, 2010. ISBN 0-578-04800-0
- Taylor, Maureen. Finding the Civil War in Your Family Album. Westwood, MA: Picture Perfect Press, 2011. ISBN 0-578-07809-0
- Taylor, Maureen. The Last Muster : Images of the Revolutionary War Generation. Kent, OH: Kent State University Press, 2010. ISBN 978-1-60635-055-3
- Taylor, Maureen. Fashionable Folks : Hairstyles, 1840-1900. Westwood, MA: Picture Perfect Press, 2009. ISBN 0-578-03490-5
- Taylor, Maureen. The Avery Family : The Ancestors and Descendants of Christopher Avery. Boston : Newbury Street Press, 2004. ISBN 0-88082-165-5
- Taylor, Maureen; Henry B Hoff; New England Historic Genealogical Society. A Guide to the Library of the New England Historic Genealogical Society. Boston, Mass. : New England Historic Genealogical Society, 2004. ISBN 0-88082-159-0
- Taylor, Maureen. Scrapbooking Your Family History. Cincinnati, Ohio : Betterway Books, ©2003. ISBN 1-55870-683-6
- Taylor, Maureen. Westwood. Charleston, SC : Arcadia, ©2002. ISBN 0-7385-1036-X
- Taylor, Maureen. Preserving Your Family Photographs : How to Organize, Present, and Restore Your Precious Family Images. Cincinnati, Ohio : Betterway Books, ©2001. ISBN 1-55870-579-1
- Taylor, Maureen. Runaways, Deserters, and Notorious Villains : From Rhode Island Newspapers. 1, The Providence Gazette : 1762 - 1800. Rockport, Me. : Picton Press, 1998. ISBN 0-89725-218-7
- Taylor, Maureen. Runaways, Deserters, and Notorious Villains : From Rhode Island Newspapers. 2.. Rockport, Me. : Picton Press, 2001. ISBN 0-89725-427-9
- Taylor, Maureen. Uncovering Your Ancestry Through Family Photographs. Cincinnati, Ohio : Betterway Books, ©2000, 2005. ISBN 1-55870-527-9
- Taylor, Maureen. Through the Eyes of Your Ancestors: A Step-by-Step Guide to Uncovering Your Family's History. Sandpiper, 1999. ISBN 0-395-86982-X
- Taylor, Maureen. Rhode Island Passenger Lists : Port of Providence, 1798-1808, 1820-1872 : Port of Bristol and Warren, 1820-1871: Compiled from United States Custom House papers. Baltimore, MD : Genealogical Pub. Co., ©1995. ISBN 0-8063-1459-1
- Taylor, Maureen; Rhode Island Historical Society. Collections. Register of Seamen's Protection Certificates from the Providence, Rhode Island Custom District, 1796-1870 : From the Custom House Papers in the Rhode Island Historical Society.. Rockport, Me. : Picton Press, 1998. ISBN 0-89725-218-7
- Taylor, Maureen. Picturing Rhode Island : Images of Everyday Life, 1850-2006. Beverly, Mass. : Commonwealth Editions, 2007. ISBN 1-933212-39-X

Joint author:

- Boumenot, Diane and Taylor, Maureen Alice. "Research in Rhode Island (NGS Research in the States Series)". Falls Church, VA : National Genealogical Society, ©2018. ISBN 978-1-935815-41-9

Contributing author pieces:

- Taylor, Maureen. Family Chronicle's More Dating Old Photographs, 1840-1929. Family Chronicle, 2004. ISBN 0-9731303-4-2
- Memory Makers Books. Family Tree Page Ideas for Scrapbookers. F+W Media, 2004. ISBN 1-892127-42-3
- Carmack, Sharon DeBartolo; Nevius, Erin. The Family Tree Resource Book for Genealogists: Family Tree Resource Book for Genealogists. Writer's Digest Books, 2004. ISBN 1-55870-686-0
- Ruberg, Michelle; Yagoda, Ben; Writer's Digest Books (Firm). Writer's Digest Handbook of Magazine Article Writing. Writer's Digest Books, 2005. ISBN 1-58297-334-2
- Nevius, Erin. The Family Tree Guide Book to Europe: Your Passport to Tracing Your Genealogy Across Europe. Betterway Books, 2003. ISBN 1-55870-675-5
- Family Tree Magazine. The Family Tree Guide Book: Everything you Need to Know to Trace Your Genealogy Across North America. Betterway Books, 2003. ISBN 1-55870-647-X
- Benes, Peter; New England Historic Genealogical Society. The Art of Family: Genealogical Artifacts in New England: NGS Conference in the States. New England Historic Genealogical Society, 2002. ISBN 0-88082-132-9
- Hannavy, John. Encyclopedia of Nineteenth-Century Photography. Routledge; 1 edition (August 24, 2007). ISBN 0-415-97235-3
