= Robert Bailey Thomas =

Creator of the Old Farmer's Almanac

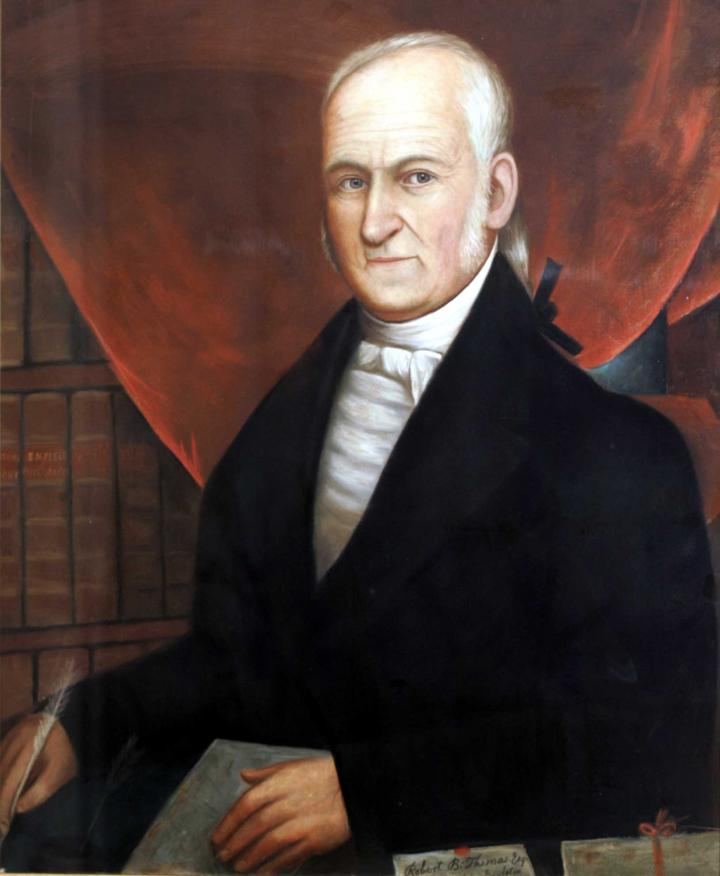
Robert Bailey Thomas by Zedekiah Belknap, 1836

Robert Bailey Thomas (April 24, 1766 - May 19, 1846), also spelled Robert Bayley Thomas, was an American who created, and for a long time published, the Old Farmer's Almanac. Thomas was born in Grafton, Massachusetts, served for a time as a schoolteacher and then bookbinder and book seller. In 1792 he began his almanac which he continued to edit until his death.

== Early life & education ==
Robert Bailey Thomas was born on April 24, 1766, in Grafton, Massachusetts, in what was then the Province of Massachusetts Bay. His family later moved to an area that would become West Boylston. He was largely educated at home by his father, who owned a small but well-used library and encouraged his son's early interest in arithmetic and astronomy. Before beginning his career, Thomas worked on his family's farm and attended local district schools, where he later returned to teach for several years.

== Teaching and bookselling career ==
Before establishing The Old Farmer's Almanac, Thomas worked in several trades that reflected his interest in books and learning. In his early adulthood, he taught in local district schools throughout central Massachusetts while also assisting his father on the family farm. After several years of teaching, he trained as a bookbinder and bookseller, professions that introduced him to the publishing world of New England in the late eighteenth century. These experiences provided him with the printing and business skills that would later prove essential in launching his own almanac.

== Old Farmer's Almanac ==
In 1792, Thomas created and published the first edition of Old Farmer's Almanac. The inaugural issue was dated for 1793 and printed by Samuel Hall of Boston. Thomas's blend of practical agricultural advice, astronomical calculations, and witty aphorisms quickly gained popularity among farmers and households throughout New England. The Almanac's circulation tripled within its second year, growing from approximately 3,000 to 9,000 copies. Thomas is said to have based his long-range weather forecasts on a secret mathematical formula involving solar activity, planetary positions, and meteorological patterns, a method that remains closely guarded by the publication's editors today.

== Later life ==
Thomas continued to edit and publish the almanac annually for over fifty years, personally overseeing every edition from its founding until his death in 1846. His meticulous calculations and emphasis on accessible, useful knowledge helped establish the almanac as a trusted household reference across the United States. By the time of his passing, The Old Farmer's Almanac had become a publishing institution—today recognized as the longest continuously published periodical in North America.

== Death ==
Thomas died on May 19 1846, at the age of eighty, reportedly while reviewing proofs for an upcoming edition of his almanac. Contemporary accounts do not specify a cause of death, but later writers noted that he remained actively involved in editing the publication until his final days.

== Legacy and cultural impact ==
Thomas's work laid the foundation for one of America's most enduring publications. His commitment to accessible science, humor, and everyday advice bridged early American life with a growing national interest in literacy and practical knowledge. The Old Farmer's Almanac continues to use his original name on its masthead and celebrates his legacy as its founder each year.
