= Old Farmer's Almanac =

Annual American periodical

The Old Farmer's Almanac
- Cover of the Old Farmer's Almanac
- Editor in Chief: Judson D. Hale Sr
- Editor: Carol Connare
- Categories: Almanacs, weather, astronomy, calendar, gardening, cooking, advice
- Frequency: Annual
- Publisher: Yankee Publishing, Inc.
- Founder: Robert B. Thomas
- Founded: 1792
- First issue: 1793
- Company: The Old Farmer's Almanac
- Country: United States; Canada
- Based in: Dublin, New Hampshire, U.S.
- Language: English
- Website: almanac.com
- ISSN: 0078-4516
- OCLC: 916592596

The Old Farmer's Almanac is an almanac containing weather forecasts, planting charts, astronomical data, recipes, and articles. Topics include gardening, sports, astronomy, folklore, and predictions on trends in fashion, food, home, technology, and living for the coming year. Published every September, The Old Farmer's Almanac has been published continuously since 1792, making it the oldest continuously published periodical in North America. It is considered “a gardener’s bible”, including gardening articles and the best days for planting crops. It is published by Yankee Publishing Inc. which also publishes a Canadian edition to cover all of North America. The publication follows in the heritage of American almanacs such as Benjamin Franklin’s Poor Richard's Almanack.

== History ==
=== 18th century ===
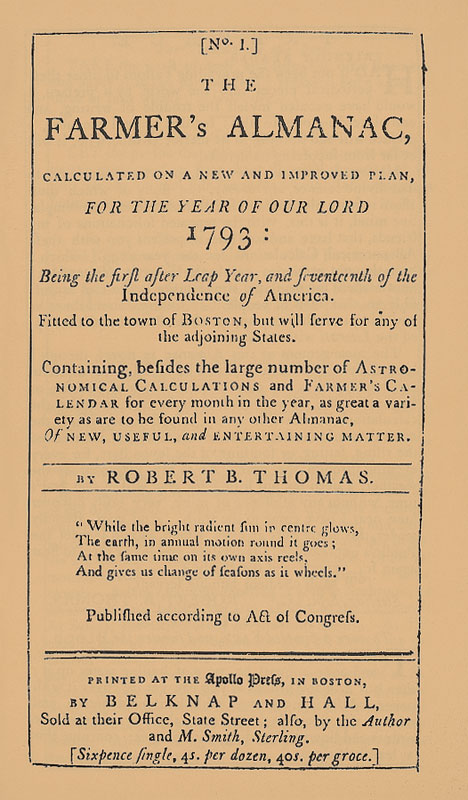
The cover of the 1793 edition

The first Old Farmer's Almanac, then known as The Farmer's Almanac, was edited by Robert Bailey Thomas, the publication's founder.

There were many competing almanacs in the 18th century, but Thomas's book was a success. In its second year, distribution tripled to 9,000. The initial cost of the book was six pence (about four cents).

To calculate the Almanac's weather predictions, Thomas studied solar activity, astronomy cycles and weather patterns and used his research to develop a secret forecasting formula, which is still in use today. Other than the Almanac's prognosticators, few people have seen the formula. It is kept in a black tin box at the Almanac offices in Dublin, New Hampshire.

Thomas also started drilling a hole through the Almanac so that subscribers could hang it from a nail or a string.

Thomas served as editor until his death on May 19, 1846. As its editor for more than 50 years, Thomas established The Old Farmer's Almanac as America's "most enduring" almanac by outlasting the competition.

In 1832, with his almanac having survived longer than similarly named competitors, Thomas inserted the word "Old" in the title, later dropping it in the title of the 1836 edition. After Thomas's death, John Henry Jenks was appointed editor and, in 1848, the book's name was permanently and officially revised to The Old Farmer's Almanac.

== 19th century ==
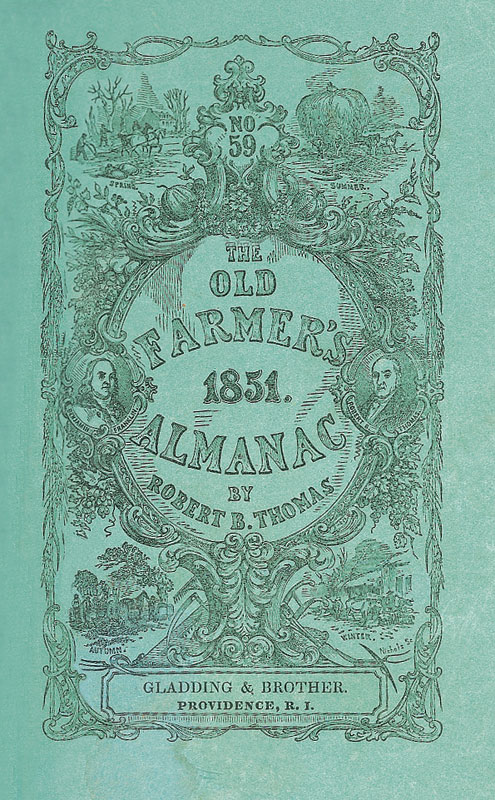
The cover of the 1851 edition

In 1851, Jenks made another change to the Almanac when he featured a "four seasons" drawing on the cover by the Boston artist Hammatt Billings, engraved by Henry Nichols. Jenks dropped the new cover for three years and then reinstated it permanently in 1855. This trademarked design is still in use today.

In 1858, Abraham Lincoln may have used a copy of The Old Farmer's Almanac to argue the innocence of his client, William "Duff" Armstrong, who was on trial for murder in Beardstown, Illinois. Lincoln used an almanac to refute the testimony of Charles Allen, an eyewitness who claimed he had seen the crime by the light of the moon on August 29, 1857. The book stated that not only was the Moon in the first quarter, but it was riding "low" on the horizon, about to set. Because the actual almanac used in the trial was not retained for posterity, there exists some controversy as to whether The Old Farmer's Almanac was the one used. In 2007, a competing almanac, the Farmers' Almanac, based in Lewiston, Maine, ran an article claiming that the almanac in question may have been theirs.

In 1861, Charles Louis Flint became editor and provided his readers with a heavier emphasis on farming. The next two editors, John Boies Tileston and Loomis Joseph Campbell, served short terms and made no format changes.

Robert Ware took over as the book's sixth editor in 1877 and served for 23 years before his brother, Horace, was named to the position in 1900.

== 20th century ==
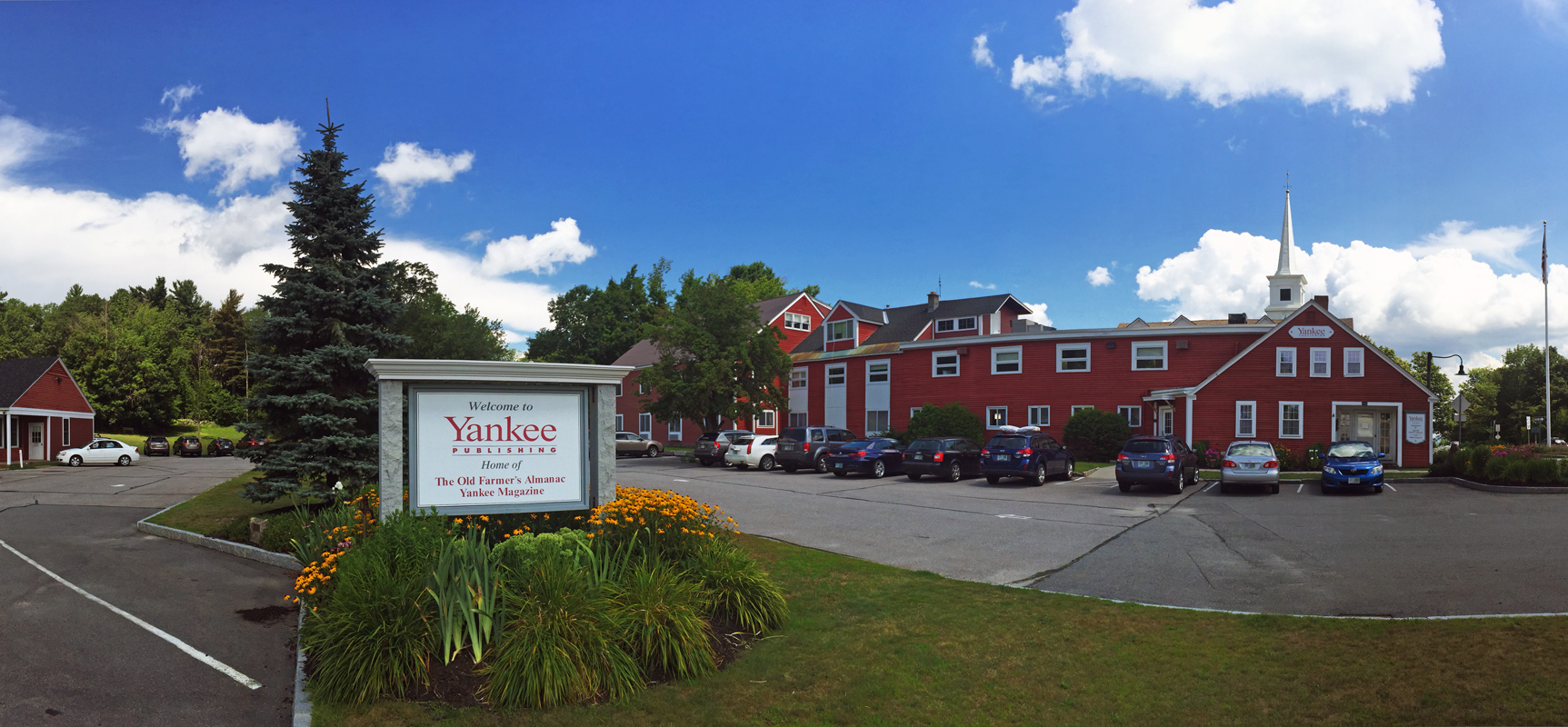
Yankee Publishing's headquarters in Dublin, New Hampshire

The Old Farmer's Almanac logo

During Horace Everett Ware's 19 years as editor, he began to orient the book toward a more general audience by replacing the scientific agricultural articles with general features on nature and modern life.

The eighth and ninth editors, Frank B. Newton and Col. Carroll J. Swan, kept The Old Farmer's Almanac tradition alive through wartime and the Depression.

Roger Scaife was appointed editor in 1936. His term coincided with the only time in the history of The Old Farmer's Almanac that its distribution declined and the book's financial stability fell into question. The 1938 edition had a circulation of less than 89,000, compared with 225,000 in 1863.

During his tenure, Scaife also committed the greatest of all blunders in Almanac history. In the 1938 edition, he dropped the weather forecasts. In their place, he substituted temperature and precipitation averages. The public outcry was so great that he reinstated the forecasts in the next year's edition, but the decision had already destroyed his reputation.

In 1939, Robb Sagendorph, founder and president of Yankee, Inc., later renamed Yankee Publishing, Inc., acquired the publishing rights to The Old Farmer's Almanac and became its editor. Sagendorph had moved his family to Dublin, New Hampshire in 1930, and started the magazine Yankee in 1935.

Feeling that tradition was The Old Farmer's Almanac's strongest suit, Sagendorph immediately reestablished its format and editorial style to reflect the interests of the general populace much as it had a century earlier. He was fond of quoting Robert B. Thomas, who wrote in 1829 that the Almanac "strives to be useful, but with a pleasant degree of humor." Under Sagendorph's leadership, The Old Farmer's Almanac thrived and readership grew each year.

During World War II, a German spy was apprehended in New York with a copy of the 1942 Old Farmer's Almanac in his pocket.

From 1943 through 1945, to comply with the U.S. Office of Censorship's voluntary Code of Wartime Practices for press and radio, The Old Farmer's Almanac featured weather indications rather than forecasts. This allowed it to maintain its perfect record of continuous publication.

Sagendorph served as the Almanac's editor until his death in 1970. His nephew, Judson D. Hale Sr., took over and kept the Almanac true to the vision of his uncle. In 2000, the editorial reins were passed to Janice Stillman, the first woman in the Almanac's history to hold the position, and she was succeeded, in 2023, by Carol Connare. Carol is the 14th person to hold the title of editor since it was first published in 1792. Hale still acted as the publication's editor in chief until his title was changed to Editor Emeritus with the 2025 edition. In 1992, the Almanac's distribution passed the four million mark. It is still headquartered in Dublin, New Hampshire.

In the 1990s, the editors decided to discontinue drilling the hole in the Almanac because it was costing them $40,000 a year and they felt that it was no longer needed. However, when they surveyed their subscribers, the response was overwhelmingly in favor of keeping the holes, so the editors decided to continue drilling them.

=== Editions ===
The Old Farmer's Almanac currently publishes two editions per year: the U.S. National edition and a Canadian edition. Its annual circulation is 3 million copies.

Formerly, the U.S. edition was published in three separate editions for different regions of the country. The only difference between the three U.S. editions was the city by which astronomical information was calculated and how tide times were presented. The National edition was fitted for Boston and the New England states; the Southern edition was fitted for Atlanta and the southern states; and the Western edition was fitted for San Francisco and the western states. Each edition contained calculations to answer for all the United States. With the discontinuation of regional editions, readers of the National edition may use the included conversion charts to adjust the published astronomical information and tide times for their region.

In 1982, The Old Farmer's Almanac began publishing an annual Canadian edition. This edition is fitted for Ottawa, with calculations to answer for all the Canadian provinces, and features provincial weather forecasts as well as stories that speak specifically to the history, traditions, and culture of the country.

== Weather predictions ==
Forecasts emphasize temperature and precipitation deviations from averages. These are based on 30-year statistical averages prepared by the National Oceanic and Atmospheric Administration and updated every ten years. The most recent climatological normals tabulation spans the period 1971 through 2000.

While The Old Farmer's Almanac has always looked to Thomas's original formula to help with predictions, its forecasting methods have been refined over the years. Today, they also incorporate observations of sunspots and other solar activity. Weather trends and events are predicted by comparing solar patterns and historical weather conditions with current solar activity.

Forecasts are prepared as much as 18 months in advance and presented in each edition by region. There are 16 regions for the U.S. and five for Canada in their respective country editions. Four additional regions are available on the Almanac's website, Almanac.com. These include Hawaii and Alaska for the U.S. and the Yukon Territory and Northwest Territories for Canada.

In 2008, the Almanac stated that the earth had entered a global cooling period that would probably last decades. The journal based its prediction on sunspot cycles. Said its contributing meteorologist Joseph D'Aleo, "Studying these and other factor[s] suggests that cold, not warm, climate may be our future."

=== Accuracy ===
A number of analyses have concluded that the forecasts in The Old Farmer's Almanac are not accurate. For example, USA Today stated that "according to numerous media analyses neither The Old Farmer's Almanac nor the Farmers' Almanac gets it right." John Walsh at the University of Illinois reviewed five years' monthly forecasts and found 50.7% of the temperature forecasts and 51.9% of precipitation forecasts were in the correct direction, whereas a randomly generated forecast would be correct 50% of the time.

In its bicentennial edition, the Almanac stated, "neither we nor anyone else has as yet gained sufficient insight into the mysteries of the universe to predict weather with anything resembling total accuracy."

== Related publications and entities ==
Under The Old Farmer's Almanac brand, Yankee Publishing also produces The Old Farmer's Almanac Garden Guide, an annual gardening resource, and The Old Farmer's Almanac for Kids, an Almanac-inspired book designed for children ages 8 and up. The latter is published every other year.

In addition to annual and biannual books, the Almanac has inspired a line of themed calendars including Gardening, Weather Watcher's, and Country (all for wall display); Every Day (with advice, folklore, and quotes in a page-a-day format); and a spiral-bound Engagement calendar. Over the years, it has also published several cookbooks, food-related magazines, and a guide for homeowners.

The Almanac has also inspired a chain of retail stores called The Old Farmer's Almanac General Store.

== Online presence ==
In 1996, The Old Farmer's Almanac launched Almanac.com. This online presence features the same kind of information found in the print edition, including weather forecasts, astronomy, folklore, recipes, gardening advice, history, and trivia.

The Almanac Webcam was installed and launched in February 2003 and a second one in September 2008. New cameras installed and launched on May 8, 2015, gave a much clearer picture of the historical buildings in downtown Dublin, New Hampshire, and The John Pierce Memorial Garden.

In 2003, The Old Farmer's Almanac distributed a 32-page Almanac Just For Kids. The positive response led to the release of The Old Farmer's Almanac for Kids in 2005, and the Almanac launched Almanac4kids.com. This site is dedicated to content for younger readers, their parents, and teachers, featuring interactive activities and exclusive articles that further explore topics found in the book.

In addition to the official websites, the Almanac also maintains a large social media presence. The Almanac can be found on Pinterest, Instagram, Twitter, and several other social sites. In August 2015, The Almanac's Facebook page reached one million fans.

== See also ==
- American almanacs
- Yankee, a magazine published by Yankee Publishing, Inc.
