= New Hampshire (magazine) =

American monthly magazine

- Categories: Regional magazine
- Frequency: Monthly
- Publisher: Yankee Publishing, Inc.
- Founder: Patricia and David Gregg
- Founded: 1988
- Company: McLean Communications, Inc.
- Country: United States
- Language: English
- Website: www.nhmagazine.com
- ISSN: 1532-0219

New Hampshire is a monthly lifestyle publication focused on "joining readers in a quest for all the best New Hampshire has to offer." It is a member of the City and Regional Magazine Association (CRMA).

== History ==
New Hampshire Magazine Vol. 1 No. 1

=== The early years ===
New Hampshire Magazine originated in 1988 in Nashua, New Hampshire, by Network Publications, Inc (owned by Patricia and David Gregg). Its point of origin and focus were predominantly Nashua, as its first name was Network Magazine of Nashua. Its first issue (Vol. 1 No.1) featured Congressman Judd Gregg (soon-to-be Governor) on the cover. New Hampshire Magazine started as a bi-monthly magazine, but after two issues, switched to monthly in February 1989.

The early mission statement for the magazine was focused around creating a lifestyle/business publication for the city which, as its reach grew, would eventually encompass the state.

New Hampshire Magazine was also one of the first publications in New Hampshire to be completely laid out on a computer (Desktop Publishing).

=== Growth through the recession ===
Over the next seven years, the reach of the magazine spread to the rest of New Hampshire. In February 1990, Network Publications, Inc. acquired Manchester magazine from Don Madden. Concord and the North was created in January 1991, followed by Hampshire East in June. In June 1994, all four magazines were titled "New Hampshire Editions," each focusing on both statewide and local stories.

Many lifestyle publications in New Hampshire struggled financially during the early 1990s, but New Hampshire Editions' hybrid mission statement had somewhat shielded it from the recession occurring in those years, and helped it grow. In 1994, Network Publications, Inc. began forming editorial boards consisting of business leaders in various industries within the state to determine editorial direction. These editorial boards focused on the fields of banking, insurance, transportation, law, and the newly emerging internet and technology sector.

Based on decisions made by these boards, several "inserts and special sections" became part of New Hampshire Editions, as well as in separate publications:

Cover of The World Trader

- The World Trader - a resource guide to worldwide commerce, in cooperation with New Hampshire Port Authority (February, 1994)
- Destination New Hampshire - a comprehensive business relocation guide and directory (November, 1994)
- New Hampshire Legacy - centered on New Hampshire's rich historical heritage (May, 1995)
- New Hampshire Guide to the Internet and Technology - introducing mixed media concepts to New Hampshire readers (October, 1996)
- Nashua Century - an in-depth look at Nashua's rich historical heritage, this was New Hampshire Editions' largest publication in history: 184 pages. Several Century magazines would be created in subsequent years. (December, 1998)

=== New Hampshire Editions and Internet years ===
In May 1995, Network Publications began electronically publishing New Hampshire Editions on the internet. New Hampshire Editions Online (https://web.archive.org/web/19981207010323/http://www.nheditions.com/) came into being, alongside the NH.com network, another property of Network Publications. With the help of the internet boom, New Hampshire Editions grew to be the largest magazine in the state.

In August 1996, all four publications would be published as one statewide magazine, focusing more on inserts and special editions rather than local topics.

=== Sale, new launch, and mission statement focus ===
In August 1998, Network Publications, Inc., and all of its properties, was acquired by Independent Publications, Inc., owner of The Telegraph in Nashua.

In 1998, IPI hired Sharron McCarthy as publisher. In March 1999, she launched New Hampshire Magazine as a monthly publication with a paid circulation base to replace New Hampshire Editions and to focus the mission on becoming the state's lifestyle magazine. The July issue became the "Best of NH" issue and is celebrated annually with the "Best of NH" party, a state-wide event attracting thousands of attendees who get to sample the best food, drinks and music in the state.

=== Recent years ===
In 2012, New Hampshire Magazine was purchased by Yankee Publishing, Inc.
