= Dublin, New Hampshire =

- Town
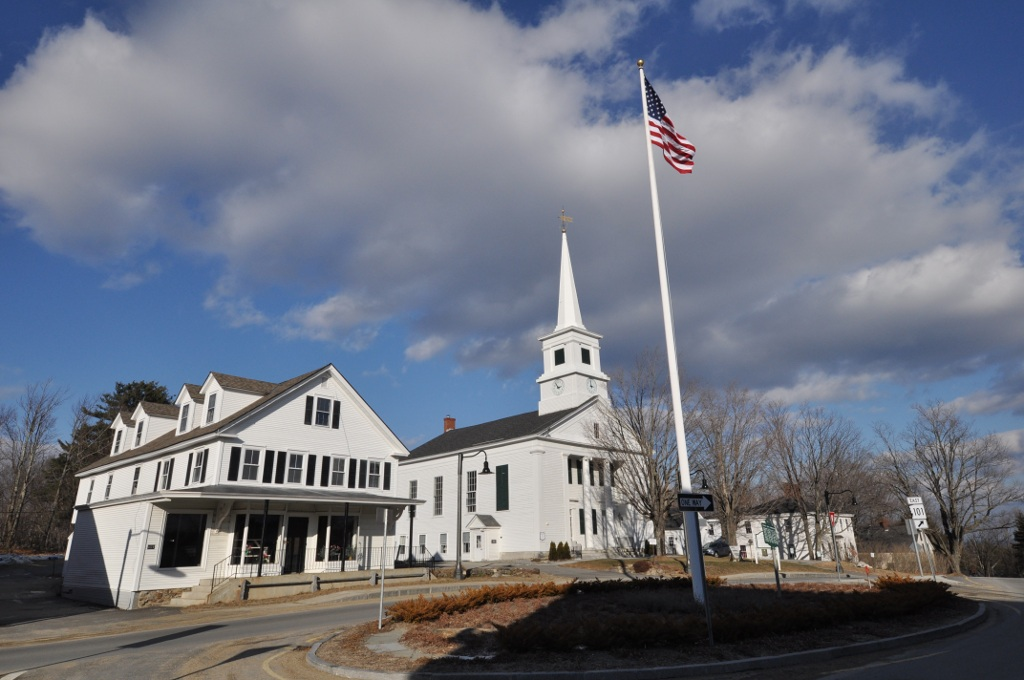
- Church and rotary in the town center

- Seal

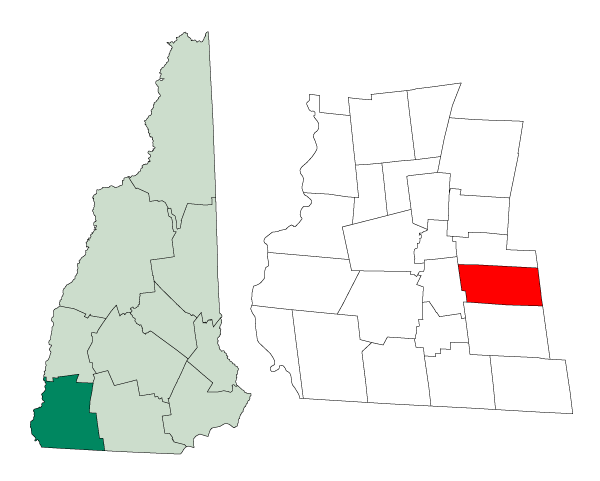
- Location in Cheshire County, New Hampshire
- Coordinates: 42°53′39″N 72°04′20″W
- Country: United States
- State: New Hampshire
- County: Cheshire
- Incorporated: 1771
- Villages: Dublin; Bonds Corner

Area
  - Total: 29.0 sq mi (75.1 km^{2})
  - Land: 27.9 sq mi (72.2 km^{2})
  - Water: 1.1 sq mi (2.8 km^{2}) 3.78%
- Elevation: 1,641 ft (500 m)

Population (2020)
  - Total: 1,532
  - Density: 55.0/sq mi (21.2/km^{2})
- Time zone: UTC-5 (Eastern)
  - Summer (DST): UTC-4 (Eastern)
- ZIP code: 03444
- Area code: 603
- FIPS code: 33-19140
- GNIS feature ID: 873581
- Website: www.townofdublin.org

Dublin is a town in Cheshire County, New Hampshire, United States. The population was 1,532 at the 2020 census, and an estimated 1,605 in 2025. It is home to Dublin School and Yankee magazine.

== History ==
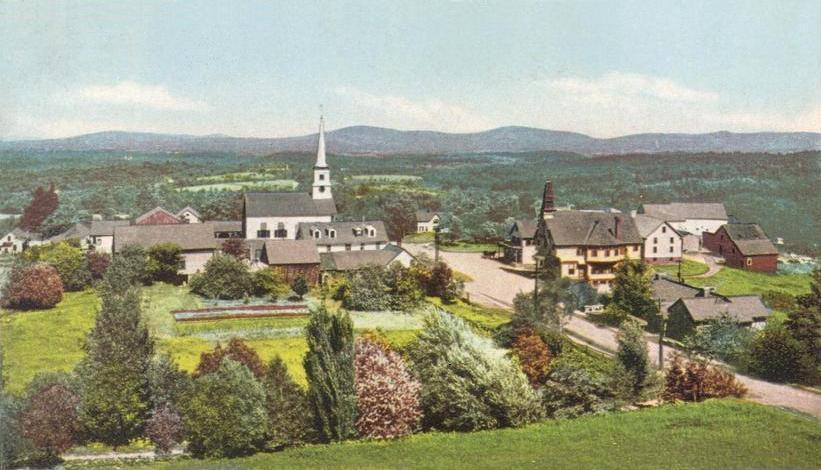
Town center in 1906

In 1749, the Masonian proprietors granted the town as "Monadnock No. 3" (or North Monadnock) to Matthew Thornton and 39 others. The 40 grantees came mostly from middle and eastern parts of New Hampshire; none of them became settlers in the township. The deed of grant, which dated November 3, 1749, was given by Col. Joseph Blanchard of Dunstable.

The French and Indian War thwarted permanent settlement until the 1760s, when Irishman Henry Strongman moved from Peterborough. Other early settlers arrived from Sherborn, Massachusetts. In 1771, Governor John Wentworth incorporated the town, naming it after Strongman's birthplace: Dublin, Ireland.

Like all towns in this area, the terrain features hills and valleys. Farmers found the soil hard and rocky, but with effort it yielded maize, oats, barley and potatoes, with some wheat and rye. Orchards were common. The first census, taken in 1790, reported 901 residents. By 1859, there were 1,088. In 1870, the small mill town of Harrisville voted to separate from Dublin, leaving the latter with only 455 residents during the 1880 census.

== Geography ==
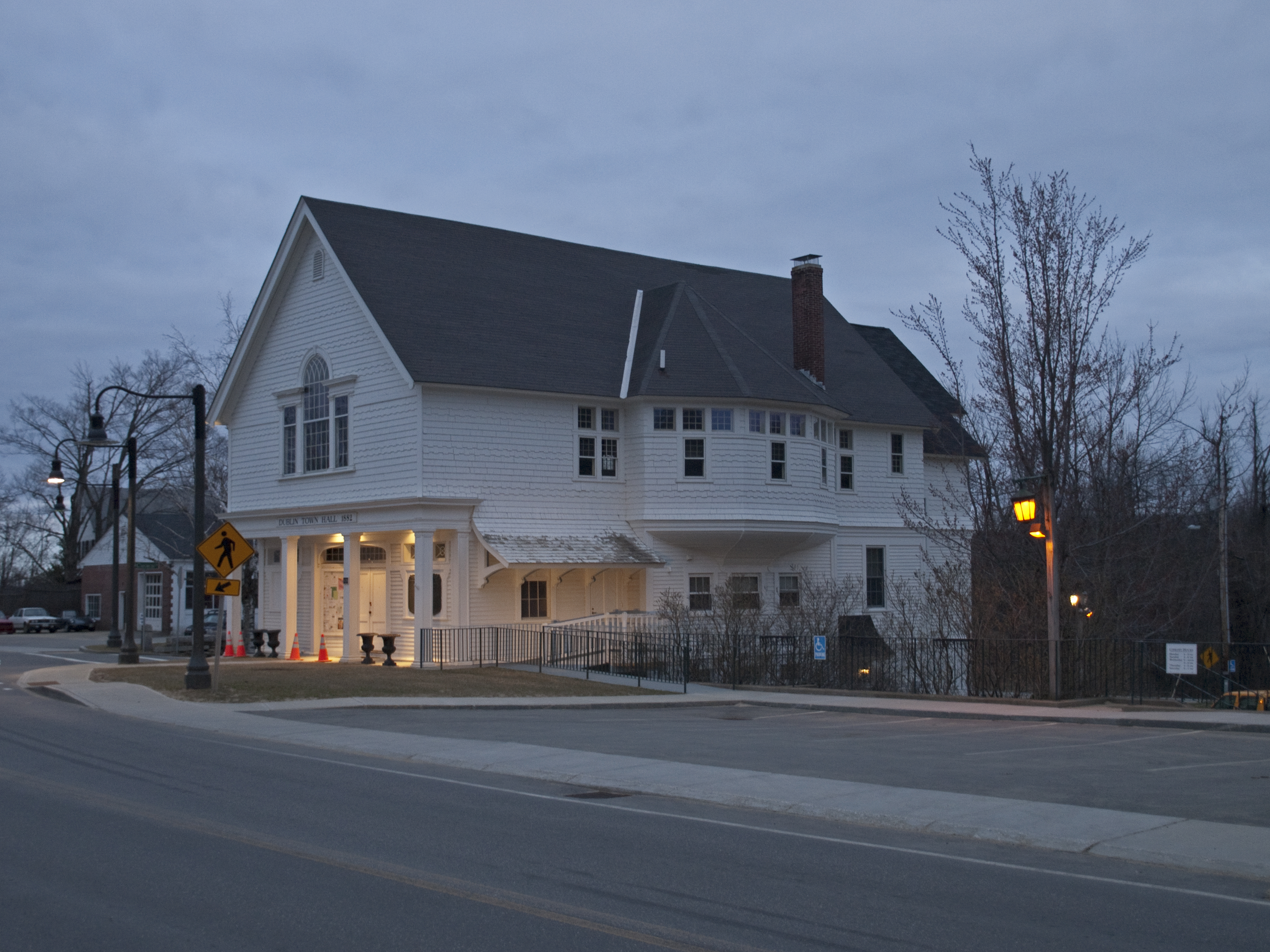
Dublin Town Hall

According to the United States Census Bureau, the town has a total area of 29.0 square miles (75.1 km^{2}), of which 27.9 square miles (72.2 km^{2}) are land and 1.1 square miles (2.8 km^{2}) are water, comprising 3.78% of the town. The northern slopes of Mount Monadnock occupy the southern part of town. The highest point in Dublin is along Monadnock's northeastern ridge, where the elevation reaches 2,834 feet (864 m) above sea level at the town line. Roughly the western half of Dublin lies within the Connecticut River watershed, drained by tributaries of the Ashuelot River, with the eastern half located in the Merrimack River watershed, drained by tributaries of the Contoocook River.

The ponds in Dublin include Monadnock Lake (now known as Dublin Pond), Farnum (Dark) Pond, and Wight Pond, as well as Howe, Knight, and Electric Company reservoirs.

Dublin Pond is a clean sheet of water that has brought many families of wealth to the area. It is surrounded by a vast area of woods leading to the edge of the summit of Mount Monadnock, and from its surface the summit and northwestern sides of the mountain are visible. At the right hour on the right kind of day, the mountain is clearly reflected upon the surface of the pond.

The town is crossed by New Hampshire Route 101 and New Hampshire Route 137. NH 101 leads east 6 miles (10 km) to Peterborough and west 8 miles (13 km) to Marlborough and 13 miles (21 km) to Keene. NH 137 leads north 7 miles (11 km) to Hancock and south 6 miles (10 km) to Jaffrey.

=== Adjacent municipalities ===
- Harrisville (north)
- Peterborough (east)
- Jaffrey (south)
- Marlborough (west)

=== Climate ===
Climate data for Dublin, New Hampshire
Month	Jan	Feb	Mar	Apr	May	Jun	Jul	Aug	Sep	Oct	Nov	Dec	Year
Record high °F (°C)	61 (16)	61 (16)	78 (26)	84 (29)	86 (30)	95 (35)	93 (34)	90 (32)	90 (32)	77 (25)	69 (21)	62 (17)	95 (35)
Mean daily maximum °F (°C)	29 (−2)	32 (0)	41 (5)	53 (12)	66 (19)	73 (23)	78 (26)	75 (24)	67 (19)	57 (14)	45 (7)	34 (1)	54 (12)
Mean daily minimum °F (°C)	8 (−13)	10 (−12)	20 (−7)	30 (−1)	41 (5)	50 (10)	55 (13)	53 (12)	45 (7)	33 (1)	26 (−3)	15 (−9)	32 (0)
Record low °F (°C)	−23 (−31)	−21 (−29)	−9 (−23)	8 (−13)	23 (−5)	32 (0)	41 (5)	40 (4)	24 (−4)	13 (−11)	4 (−16)	−11 (−24)	−23 (−31)
Average precipitation inches (mm)	3.86 (98)	3.04 (77)	3.96 (101)	3.91 (99)	4.57 (116)	4.05 (103)	4.18 (106)	4.30 (109)	3.88 (99)	4.03 (102)	4.17 (106)	3.90 (99)	47.84 (1,215)
Average snowfall inches (cm)	16.5 (42)	19.6 (50)	12.4 (31)	5.3 (13)	0.5 (1.3)	0 (0)	0 (0)	0 (0)	0 (0)	0.4 (1.0)	6.4 (16)	16.4 (42)	77.5 (197)

== Architecture ==
The history of Dublin's architecture starts with the foundation of the United States, and the development of the Federal style of architecture. The style in Dublin can be attributed to one Rufus Piper, who served as the town moderator and was a carpenter at the time. Piper was responsible for adding fans to various houses in the town, which included his own home and his grandfather's house.

== Demographics ==
Historical population
Census	Pop.	Note	%±
1790	901		—
1800	1,188		31.9%
1810	1,184		−0.3%
1820	1,620		36.8%
1830	1,218		−24.8%
1840	1,075		−11.7%
1850	1,088		1.2%
1860	1,096		0.7%
1870	930		−15.1%
1880	456		−51.0%
1890	582		27.6%
1900	620		6.5%
1910	571		−7.9%
1920	408		−28.5%
1930	506		24.0%
1940	621		22.7%
1950	675		8.7%
1960	684		1.3%
1970	837		22.4%
1980	1,303		55.7%
1990	1,474		13.1%
2000	1,476		0.1%
2010	1,597		8.2%
2020	1,532		−4.1%
2024 (est.)	1,593		4.0%
U.S. Decennial Census

At the 2000 census, there were 1,476 people, 560 households and 417 families residing in the town. The population density was 52.7 inhabitants per square mile (20.3/km^{2}). There were 686 housing units at an average density of 24.5 per square mile (9.5/km^{2}). The racial makeup of the town was 97.29% White, 0.34% African American, 0.54% Native American, 0.95% Asian, 0.41% from other races, and 0.47% from two or more races. Hispanic or Latino of any race were 1.15% of the population.

There were 560 households, of which 32.5% had children under the age of 18 living with them, 65.4% were married couples living together, 6.6% had a female householder with no husband present, and 25.4% were non-families. 21.1% of all households were made up of individuals, and 6.6% had someone living alone who was 65 years of age or older. The average household size was 2.51 and the average family size was 2.89.

23.4% of the population were under the age of 18, 5.9% from 18 to 24, 25.0% from 25 to 44, 32.5% from 45 to 64, and 13.2% who were 65 years of age or older. The median age was 43 years. For every 100 females, there were 101.1 males. For every 100 females age 18 and over, there were 99.5 males.

The median household income was $52,150 and the median income for a family was $57,578. Males had a median income of $36,853 compared with $25,859 for females. The per capita income was $27,028. About 6.0% of families and 10.6% of the population were below the poverty line, including 16.8% of those under age 18 and 5.0% of those age 65 or over.

== Economy ==
Dublin is the base for Yankee Publishing Inc., the publisher of the Old Farmer's Almanac and Yankee magazine.

== Education ==
- Dublin School, a coeducational private boarding school, founded in 1935 by Paul W. Lehmann
- The Walden School, a summer music camp on the campus of Dublin School
- Dublin Christian Academy, founded in 1963

== The visit from ‘Abdu’l‑Bahá ==
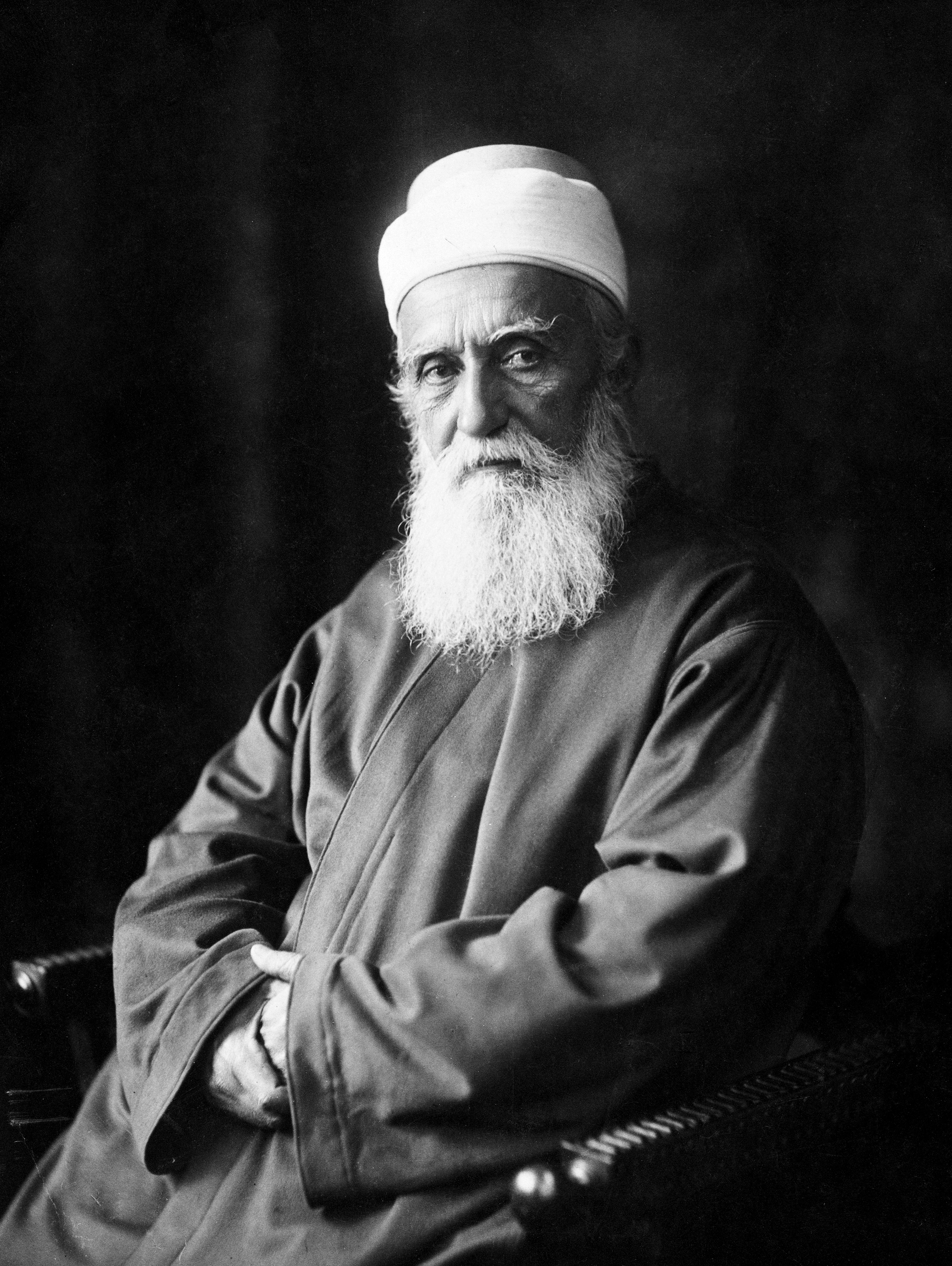
Photograph of ‘Abdu’l‑Bahá

In 1912, ʻAbdu'l-Bahá, the son and chosen successor of the Baháʼu'lláh, the Prophet-Founder of the Baháʼí Faith, visited Dublin for 23 days, from July 25 to August 16, on his journey through the United States to spread the Bahá’í teachings after his release from 40 years of imprisonment. Spending the most consecutive days of his journey in Dublin, he gave many talks ranging from gender equality, the immortality of the soul, industrial and economic justice, the elimination of racial prejudice, spiritual and material education, Biblical symbolism, theology, the coming together of people from the East and the West, and other Bahá’í principles.

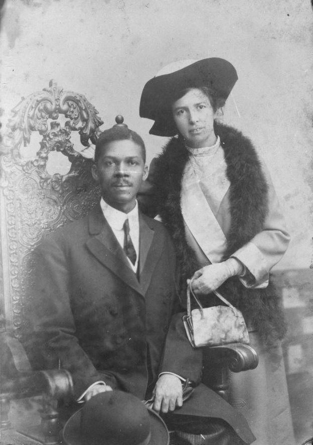
Louis G. Gregory and his wife Louisa Mathew Gregory

In Dublin, ‘Abdu’l‑Bahá stayed with Agnes Parsons, a Bahá’í socialite from Washington, DC, and a summer resident of Dublin whose home once stood on Windmill Hill Road. The first of his two high-profile addresses in Dublin was at a gathering at the Parsons' boathouse on Dublin Pond, owned now by the Dublin School, with local non-resident African-American servants who worked in town. In this gathering he spoke on the need for unity and amity between blacks and whites and announced the interracial marriage of two young Bahá’ís, Louis Gregory, an African-American lawyer, and Louisa Mathew, a white English woman, whom he had previously suggested to marry each other. This act was considered radical at the time, with interracial marriage still illegal in many states.

Asked to speak at the local Unitarian church one Sunday, an event attracting some 300 people, ‘Abdu’l‑Bahá spoke on the subject of spiritual education. The anniversary of his historic visit and address is commemorated annually by the church, known now as the Dublin Community Church. Rev. Howard Colby Ives, a Unitarian minister, wrote of that day,

What His subject was I do not recall, nor does a single word of His address remain with me. My memory is all of the quiet New England church; the crowded pews, and ‘Abdu’l‑Bahá on the platform. His cream-colored robe; His white hair and beard; His radiant smile and courteous demeanor... And His voice! Like a resonant bell of finest timbre; never loud but of such penetrating quality that the walls of the room seemed to vibrate with its music.

‘Abdu’l‑Bahá spent time at the Dublin Inn, which has since been purchased and donated to the Bahá’í community as a space for gathering, prayer, meditation, and historic preservation.

== Current events ==
2019 is the 48th year for the Dublin Gas Engine Meet on Cricket Hill Farm, which is the longest lasting tradition in Dublin after Town Meeting. Every year, the town prepares starting in October for the Halloween events around town that occur each year.

== Notable people ==
- Galen Clark (1814–1910), nature activist
- Grenville Clark (1882–1967), lawyer, nominee for Nobel Peace Prize
- Doris Haddock (1910–2010), political activist for Campaign finance reform in the United States
- Moses Mason, Jr. (1789–1866), physician, US congressman
- William Preston Phelps (1848–1923), artist, known as "the Painter of the Monadnock"
- Abbott Handerson Thayer (1849–1921), artist, naturalist, teacher
- Mark Twain (1835–1910), writer, (summer resident, two years)

== See also ==
- List of Irish place names in other countries
